= List of contemporary French historians =

== A ==
- Alexandre Adler
- Charles-Robert Ageron
- Maurice Agulhon
- Henri Amouroux
- Michel Antoine
- Daniel Arasse
- Philippe Ariès
- Robert Aron
- Philippe A. Autexier
- Jean-Pierre Azéma

== B ==
- Paul Bairoch
- Françoise Balibar*Colette Beaune
- Annette Becker
- Jean-Jacques Becker
- François Bédarida
- Yves-Marie Bercé
- Jean-François Berdah
- Jacques Berlioz
- Carmen Bernand
- Serge Berstein
- Marc Bloch
- François Bluche
- Frédéric Bluche
- Sandra Boehringer
- Pascal Bonafoux
- Frédéric Bozo
- Raphaëlle Branche
- Fernand Braudel
- Pierre Briant
- Pierre Broué
- Denis Buican
- Philippe Burrin

== C ==
- Patrick Cabanel
- Olivier Carré
- Hélène Carrère d'Encausse
- André Castelot
- Michel de Certeau
- Jean-Pierre Chaline
- Nadine-Josette Chaline
- Olivier Chaline
- Roger Chartier
- Pierre Chaunu
- Alain Corbin
- Robert Cornevin
- Stéphane Courtois
- Denis Crouzet
- François Crouzet
- Elisabeth Crouzet-Pavan

== D ==
- Alain Decaux
- Jean-Pierre Dedieu
- Robert Delort
- Laurence des Cars
- Marcel Detienne
- Jean-Luc Domenach
- François Dosse
- Georges Duby
- Georges Dumézil
- Françoise Dunand
- Jean-Baptiste Duroselle

== E ==
- Christiane Éluère
- Alain Erlande-Brandenburg

== F ==
- Alexandre Farnoux
- Sébastien Fath
- Jean Favier
- Marc Ferro
- André Fontaine
- Geneviève Fraisse
- François Furet

== G ==
- Max Gallo
- Emilio Gentile
- Raoul Girardet
- Serge Gruzinski
- Pierre Guillaume

== H ==
- Mohammed Harbi
- François Hinard
- Gabrielle Houbre
- Anne Hugon

== J ==
- Jean-Noël Jeanneney
- Arlette Jouanna

== K ==
- Simon Kitson
- Annie Kriegel

== L ==
- Étienne de la Vaissière
- Pierre Laborie
- Jean Lacouture
- Marc Lazar
- Nicolas Lebourg
- Jacques Le Goff
- Emmanuel Le Roy Ladurie
- Philippe Levillain
- Pierre Lévêque
- Bernard Lewis
- Claude Liauzu
- Yann Le Bohec

== M ==
- Jean Maitron
- Martin Malia
- Henri-Irénée Marrou
- Albert Mathiez
- Hélène Miard-Delacroix
- Pierre Milza
- Philippe Minard
- Claudia Moatti
- Philippe Moreau Defarges
- Claude Mossé
- Michel Mourre

== N ==
- Claude Nicolet
- Gérard Noiriel
- Pierre Nora

== O ==
- Jean-Marc Olivier
- Pascal Ory
- Mona Ozouf

== P ==
- Michel Pastoureau
- Sylvie Patin
- Jean-Christian Petitfils
- Michelle Perrot
- Charles Pietri
- Luce Pietri
- Hervé Pinoteau
- Léon Poliakov
- Alice Poulleau
- Antoine Prost

== QR ==
- René Rémond
- Pierre Renouvin
- Jacques Revel
- Serge Ricard
- Jean-Pierre Rioux
- Louis Robert
- Daniel Roche
- Henry Rousso
- Odile Rudelle

== S ==
- Gisèle Sapiro
- Albert Soboul
- Zeev Sternhell
- Benjamin Stora

== T ==
- Alain Tallon
- Georges Tate
- Emmanuel Todd
- Tzvetan Todorov
- Jean Tulard

== UV ==
- Justin Vaïsse
- Maurice Vaïsse
- André Vauchez
- Marc Venard
- Jean-Pierre Verdet
- Jean-Pierre Vernant
- Paul Veyne
- Pierre Vidal-Naquet
- Georges Vigarello
- Michel Vovelle

== W ==
- Nicolas Werth
- Annette Wieviorka
- Olivier Wieviorka

== See also ==
- List of historians
- List of French historians
