= Agostino Paravicini Bagliani =

Italian historian

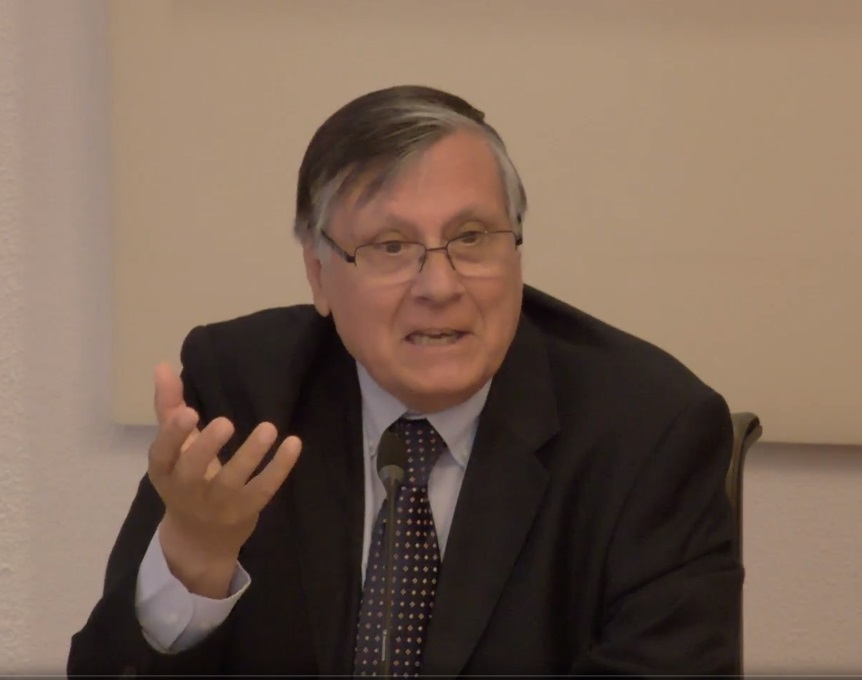

Agostino Paravicini Bagliani (born 19 November 1943, Bergamo) is an Italian historian, specializing in the history of the papacy, cultural anthropology, and in the history of the body and the relationship between nature and society during the Middle Ages.

== Biography ==
He received his PhD in humanities in 1968 and his professorship at the University of Fribourg (Switzerland) in 1978. From 1969 to 1981 he was Scriptor of the Vatican Library, and from 1972 to 1981 Professor of Codicology at the Vatican School of Palaeography, Diplomatics and Archivistics. From 1981 to 2009 he was full professor of medieval history at the University of Lausanne. He teaches at the University of San Raffaele "Vita-Salute" in Cesano Maderno (Milan) and at the Institute of Italian Studies, University of Italian Switzerland (Lugano).

From 2000 to 2003 Paravicini Bagliani was vice president, and from 2005 to 2007 president of the Union Académique Internationale (UAI). In 2008 he became president of the Società internazionale per lo studio del Medioevo latino (S.I.S.M.E.L. – Florence), and in 1989 editor of the book series Cahiers lausannois d'histoire médiévale. Since 1993 he edits the periodical Micrologus. Natura, scienze e società medievali (SISMEL – Edizioni del Galluzzo), and since 1997 the book series La corte dei papi (Rome, Viella); from 1998 the series Micrologus' Library (SISMEL – Edizioni del Galluzzo), as well as the series Edizione Nazionale "La Scuola Medica Salernitana" from 2006. In 2002 he became editor of the periodical Rivista di storia della Chiesa in Italia. In 2009 he became Chairman of the Edizione Nazionale dei Testi Mediolatini. He is also a contributor of Italian newspapers, such as La Repubblica and L'Osservatore Romano.

== Awards and honours ==
In November 2008 he was awarded an Honorary Doctorate by the Ecole Pratique des Hautes Etudes of the Sorbonne in Paris. In 1995 he received the Prize of the City of Empoli, in 1997 the Prize of the City of Ascoli Piceno and in 1998 the International Prize of Finale Ligure.

== Bibliography ==
=== Books ===
- 1972
  - Cardinali di Curia e familiae cardinalizie dal 1227 al 1254, 2 vol., Padua, Antenore, (Italia Sacra, 18–19)
- 1977
  - Corso di codicologia, Rome, Città del Vaticano
  - Maier, Anneliese, Ausgehendes Mittelalter. Gesammelte Aufsätze zur Geistesgeschichte des 14. Jahrhunderts, 3 vol., Rome, Storia e letteratura
- 1980
  - I testamenti dei cardinali del Duecento, Rome, Società romana di storia patria, 1980 (Miscellanea della Società Romana di storia patria, 25)
- 1981
  - Studi sul secolo XIV in memoria di Anneliese Maier, Rome, Ed. di storia e letteratura (Storia e letteratura, 151)
- 1987
  - con Bernard Andenmatten, Ecoles et vie intellectuelle à Lausanne au Moyen Age, Lausanne (Etudes et documents pour servir à l'histoire de l'Université de Lausanne 12 / Publications de l'Université de Lausanne, XII)
  - Le mouvement confraternel au Moyen Age. France, Italie, Suisse. Actes de la Table Ronde organisée par l'Université de Lausanne avec le concours de l'Ecole Française de Rome et de l'Unité associée 1011 du CNRS "L'institution ecclésiale à la fin du Moyen Age". Lausanne 9-11 mai 1985, Genève, Droz (Publications de la Faculté des Lettres, Université de Lausanne, 30; Collection de l'Ecole française de Rome, 97)
- 1989
  - con Jean-François Poudret, La Maison de Savoie et le Pays de Vaud, Lausanne, Bibliothèque historique vaudoise (Bibliothèque historique vaudoise, 97)
  - Les manuscrits enluminés des Comtes et Ducs de Savoie, Turin, U. Allemandi
  - with Giorgio Stabile, Träume im Mittelalter. Ikonologische Studien, Stuttgart, Belser Verlag
- 1990
  - with Jean-Claude Maire Vigueur, Ars et ratio: dalla torre di Babele al ponte di Rialto, Palermo, Sellerio (Prisma, 122)
- 1991
  - Medicina e scienze della natura alla corte dei papi nel Duecento, Spoleto, Centro italiano di Studi sull’Alto Medio Evo, 1991 (Biblioteca di Medioevo latino, 4)
  - with Bernard Andenmatten e la collaborazione di Nadia Pollini, Amédée VIII – Félix V, premier duc de Savoie et pape (1383–1451), Lausanne, Bibliothèque historique vaudoise (Bibliothèque historique vaudoise, 103)
  - with Jean-Claude Maire Vigueur, La parola all’accusato, Palermo, Sellerio
- 1992
  - Belser Bildgeschichte des Mittelalters, vol. 1–2, Stuttgart, Belser Verlag
  - with Piera Borradori e Nadia Pollini, Le Pays de Vaud vers 1300, Lausanne, Université de Lausanne – Faculté des Lettres (Cahiers lausannois d'histoire médiévale, 6)
  - with André Vauchez, Poteri carismatici e informali: chiesa e società medioevali, Palermo, Sellerio
- 1993
  - with Ansgar Wildermann, and the collaboration of Véronique Pasche, La visite des églises du diocèse de Lausanne en 1453, 2 vol., Lausanne, Société d’histoire de la Suisse romande, (Mémoires et documents de la Société d’histoire de Suisse romande, 3e série, 19–20)
- 1994
  - Il corpo del papa, Turin, Einaudi (Biblioteca di cultura storica, 204) (French trans. Catherine Dalarun Mitrovitsa: Le corps du pape, Paris, Editions du Seuil, 1997; German trans. Ansgar Wildermann: Der Leib des Papstes, München, Beck, 1997 (C.H. Beck Kulturwissenschaft); Engl. transl. David S. Peterson: The Pope’s Body, Chicago, University of Chicago Press, 1999)
  - with Bernard Andenmatten and Annick Vadon, Héraldique et emblématique de la Maison de Savoie: (XIe – XVIe s.), Lausanne, Université de Lausanne – Faculté des Lettres (Cahiers lausannois d'histoire médiévale, 10)
  - with Jacques Chiffoleau and Lauro Martines, Riti e rituali nelle società medievali, Spoleto, Centro italiano di studi sull'alto medioevo, 1994 (Collectanea, 5)
- 1995
  - La cour des papes au XIIIe siècle, Paris, Hachette (La vie quotidienne)
  - with Pierre Toubert, Federico II, 3 vols., Palermo, Sellerio, 1995.
  - with Véronique Pasche, La Parrocchia nel Medio Evo. Economia, scambi, solidarietà, Roma, Herder, 1995 (Italia Sacra, 53)
- 1996
  - Il trono di Pietro. L'universalità del papato da Alessandro III a Bonifacio VIII, Rome, La Nuova Italia Scientifica
  - La vita quotidiana alla corte dei papi del Duecento, Rome-Bari, Laterza
- 1997
  - with Jean-François Felber, Jean-Daniel Morerod, Véronique PascheLes, Pays romands au Moyen Age, Lausanne, Payot (Territoires)
- 1998
  - with Pierre Toubert, Federico II e la Sicilia, Palermo, Sellerio (L'isola)
  - with Francesco Santi, The regulation of evil: social and cultural attitudes to epidemics in the late Middle Ages, Florence, SISMEL – Edizioni del Galluzzo (Micrologus' Library, 2)
  - Le Chiavi e la Tiara. Immagini e simboli del papato medievale, Rome, Viella, (La corte dei papi, 3); II ed. 2005
- 1999
  - with Martine Ostorero, Kathrin Utz Tremp, and the collaboration of Catherine Chène, L’imaginaire du sabbat: édition critique des textes les plus anciens (1430 c.- 1440 c.), Lausanne, Université de Lausanne – Faculté des Lettres (Cahiers lausannois d’histoire médiévale, 26)
- 2000
  - with Baudouin Van den Abeele, La chasse au Moyen Age: société, traités, symboles, Florence, SISMEL – Edizioni del Galluzzo (Micrologus' Library, 5)
  - with Bernard Andenmatten and Eva Pibiri, Pierre II de Savoie 'Le Petit Charlemagne' († 1268), Lausanne, Université de Lausanne – Faculté des Lettres (Cahiers lausannois d’histoire médiévale, 27)
- 2001
  - Le Speculum Astronomiae, une énigme? Enquête sur les manuscrits, Florence, SISMEL – Edizioni del Galluzzo (Micrologus' Library, 6)
- 2003
  - with Chiara Crisciani, Alchimia e medicina nel Medioevo, Florence, SISMEL – Edizioni del Galluzzo (Micrologus' Library, 9)
  - with Eva Pibiri and Denis Reynard, L’itinérance des seigneurs (XIVe – XVIe siècles), Lausanne, Université de Lausanne – Faculté des Lettres (Cahiers lausannois d’histoire médiévale, 34)
  - Boniface VIII. Un pape hérétique?, Paris, Payot & Rivages (trad. ital. Franco Bacchelli: Bonifacio VIII, Torino, Einaudi, 2003).
- 2005
  - La mémoire du temps au Moyen Age, Florence, SISMEL – Edizioni del Galluzzo (Micrologus' Library, 12)
- 2007
  - with Danielle Jacquart, La Scuola medica salernitana. Gli autori e i testi, Florence, SISMEL – Edizioni del Galluzzo (Edizione Nazionale 'La scuola medica salernitana', 1)
  - with Jean-Michel Spieser e Jean Wirth, Le portrait, la représentation de l’individu, Firenze, SISMEL – Edizioni del Galluzzo (Micrologus' Library, 17)
- 2008
  - with Bernadette Martin-Hisard, Medievalia et Vaticana. Etudes offertes à Louis Duval-Arnould, réunies par Jean-Marie Martin, Florence
- 2009
  - Il potere del papa. Autorappresentazione e simboli, Florence, SISMEL – Edizioni del Galluzzo
  - Il papato nel secolo XIII. Cent’anni di bibliografia (1875–2009), Florence, SISMEL – Edizioni del Galluzzo (Millennio Medievale, 78. Strumenti e studi, 83)
- 2012
  - Indexes Micrologus (1–20), Micrologus' Library (1–45) Firenze, Sismel Edizioni del Galluzzo, XI-431 p.
- 2013
  - Morte ed elezione dei papi. Norme, riti e conflitti Il Medioevo, Roma, Viella, VII-335 p.
- 2013
  - Il papato e altre invenzioni. Il Medioevo nelle simboliche del presente (Articoli per il quotidiano La Repubblica) Firenze, Sismel Edizioni del Galluzzo (edizione limitata e non-venale).
- 2014
  - Il papato e altre invenzioni. Frammenti di cronaca dal Medioevo a papa Francesco Firenze, Sismel Edizioni del Galluzzo, X-200 p.

=== Articles (from 2003) ===
- 2003
  - Boniface VIII, le pape qui voulait être Dieu, L’Histoire, 279 (2003, septembre), p. 72–76.
  - La genèse du sabbat des sorciers et des sorcières, Bern, 2003 (Académie suisse des sciences humaines et sociales, Akademievorträge, Heft X), p. 22.
  - La mobilità della corte papale nel secolo XIII, in Itineranza pontificia. La mobilità della curia papale nel Lazio (secoli XII-XIII), ed. Sandro Carocci, Rome, 2003, p. 3–78.
  - Ruggero Bacone e l’alchimia di lunga vita. Riflessioni sui testi, in Alchimia e medicina nel Medioevo, eds. Chiara Crisciani and Agostino Paravicini Bagliani, Florence, 2003 (Micrologus' Library, 9), p. 33–54.
- 2004
  - Cultura e mentalità di Bonifacio VIII. A proposito di alcuni studi recenti, in Bonifacio VIII, i Caetani e la storia del Lazio. Atti del Convegno di studi storici. Rome, Palazzo Caetani, 30 novembre 2000. Latina, Palazzo 2M 1 dicembre 2000, Sermoneta, Castello Caetani, 2 dicembre 2000, Rome, 2004, p. 23–41.
  - De fratrum nostrorum consilio. La plenitudo potestatis del papa ha bisogno di Consigli?, in Consilium. Theorie e pratiche del consigliare nella cultura medievale, ed. Carla Casagrande, Chiara Crisciani, Silvana Vecchio, Florence, 2004, p. 181–194.
  - L’étrange rituel de la mort du pape, L’Histoire, 284 (2004, février), p. 77–87.
  - La crisi del papato e della cristianità. Dal concetto di Europa alla genesi del sabba, in Caterina Vigri. La santa e la città. Atti del Convegno, Bologna, 13–15 novembre 2002, ed. Claudio Leonardi, Firenze, 2004, p. 167–175.
  - La famiglia di un cardinale del XIII secolo, Tutti gli uomini del cardinale. Atti del convegno internazionale del 10 maggio 2003. Pozzuolo Martesana, Pozzuolo Martesana, 2004, p. 17–38.
  - La mobilità della corte papale nel Duecento. Cura corporis e vita di corte, in Domus et splendida palatia. Residenze papali e cardinalizie a Roma fra XII e XV secolo, ed. Alessio Monciatti, Pisa, 2004, p. 29–42.
  - Le fastueux spectacle de la cour du palais des Papes, Notre Histoire, 226–227 (2004), p. 33–36.
  - Les papes du XIe au XIIIe siècle, Notre Histoire, 226–227 (2004), p. 27–30.
- 2005
  - Bonifacio VIII, la Loggia di giustizia al Laterano e i processi generali di scomunica, Rivista di storia della Chiesa in Italia, 49, 2 (2005), p. 377–428.
  - Bonifacio VIII, la pace e la guerra: autorappresentazione e ritualità, in Guerra y diplomacia en la Europa occidental 1280–1480, Pamplona, 2005 (XXXI Semana de Estudios Medievales Estalla, 19 a 23 de julio de 2004), p. 69–82.
  - Introduction: La mémoire du temps au Moyen Age, études réunies par Agostino Paravicini Bagliani, Firenze, 2005 (Micrologus' Library, 12), p. IX-XIII.
  - L’elezione del papa re, in Medioevo. Un passato da riscoprire, settembre 2005, p. 58–69.
  - Egidio Romano, l’arca di Noé et la tiara di Bonifacio VIII, in Chiesa, vita religiosa, società nel Medioevo italiano, eds. Mariaclara Rossi and Gian Maria Varanini, Rome, 2005 (Italia Sacra, 80), pp. 503–19.
  - Pensiero e sperimentazioni istituzionali nella Societas Christiana (1046–1250). A proposito della XVI Settimana internazionale di studi medievali del Passo della Mendola (26–31 agosto 2004), Rivista di storia della Chiesa in Italia, 49, 1 (2005), p. 102–118.
  - Préface: Saint Nicolas. Les aventures du patron de Fribourg, publié sous la direction de Jean Steinauer, Fribourg, 2005, p. 7–9.
  - Quando il papa muore fuori di Roma, in Arnolfo di Cambio, una rinascita nell’Umbria medievale, ed. Vittoria Garibaldi, Bruno Toscano, Milan, 2005, p. 53–59.
- 2006
  - Bonifacio VIII e il segreto, in Micrologus XIV (Il Segreto), Florence, 2006, pp. 311–21.
  - Gregorio Magno. Roma, Bisanzio, Europa, in Gregorio Magno e l’invenzione del Medioevo, ed. Luigi G. G. Ricci, Florence, 2006, p. 11–26.
  - Il busto di Bonifacio VIII. Nuove testimonianze e una rilettura, in Arnolfo di Cambio e la sua epoca. Costruire, scolpire, dipingere, decorare. Atti del Convegno internazionale di studi, Firenze-Colle di Val d’Elsa, 7–10 marzo 2006, ed. Vittorio Franchetti Pardo, Rome, 2006, p. 189–196.
  - Il papato da Leone IX a Bonifacio VIII. Centralità e universalità, in Storia d’Europa e del Mediterraneo, Alessandro Barbero (dir.), vol. VIII, ed. Sandro Carocci, Rome, 2006, p. 553–586.
  - L’alchimiste et les secrets de jeunesse, L’Histoire, 314 (2006, novembre), p. 60–63.
  - Le pape c’est le Christ sur terre, L’Histoire, 305 (2006, janvier), p. 64–67.
  - Les portraits de Boniface VIII: une tentative de synthèse, in Le portrait. La représentation de l’individu, textes réunis par Agostino Paravicini Bagliani, Jean-Michel Spieser et Jean Wirth, Florence, 2006, pp. 117–39.
  - Une question de peau, L’Histoire, 306 (2006, février), p. 36- 40.
- 2007
  - I papi e la medicina di Salerno (XII-XIII s.), in La Scuola Medica Salernitana. Gli autori e i testi, eds. Danielle Jacquart and Agostino Paravicini Bagliani, Firenze, 2007 (Edizione Nazionale 'La Scuola Medica Salernitana', 1), p. 385–402.
  - Indagine codicologica e edizione critica dei testi scientifici medievali. Intorno al De retardatione accidentium senectutis e allo Speculum astronomiae, in Quindici anni di esperienze nella critica del testo mediolatino. Atti del Convegno Sismel 2006 = Filologia mediolatina, 14 (2007), p. 43–56.
  - Niccolò da Treviso e Bonifacio VIII, in Benedetto XI, frate Predicatore e papa, ed. Marina Benedetti, Milano 2007, p. 25–41.
  - Pensiero e sperimentazioni istituzionali nella 'Societas Christiana' (1046–1250), in Pensiero e sperimentazioni istituzionali nella 'Societas Christiana' (1046–1250). Atti della sedicesima Settimana internazionale di studio. Mendola, 26–31 agosto 2004, a cura di Giancarlo Andenna, Milano, 2007 (Storia. Ricerche), p. 801–824.
  - Préface: Inquisition et sorcellerie en Suisse romande. Le registre Ac 29 des Archives cantonales vaudoises (1438–1528), textes réunis par Martine Ostorero et Kathrin Utz Tremp, en collaboration avec Georg Modestin, Lausanne, 2007 (Cahiers Lausannois d’histoire médiévale, 41), p. 5–7.
  - Un’alchimia ben riuscita, Medioevo. Un passato da riscoprire, giugno 2007, p. 12–13.
  - Premessa, in Alphita. Edicióon criítica y comentario de Alejandro García González, Sismel Edizioni del Galluzzo 2007 (Edizione Nazionale La Scuola Medica Salernitana, 2), p. IX-XII.
  - «Storia della Chiesa in Europa», Rivista di storia della Chiesa in Europa, 61 (2007), 508–13.
- 2008
  - Boniface VIII and His Self-Representation: Images and Gestures, in The four Modes of Seeing. Approaches to Medieval Imagery in Honor of Madeline Harrison Caviness, cur. Evelyn Staudinger Lane, Elizabeth Carson Paston, Ellen M. Shortell, Burlington, VT 2008, p. 414-17
  - Opicinus de Canistris et la symbolique pontificale, in Medievalia et Vaticana. Etudes offertes à Louis Duval-Arnould, réunies par Jean-Marie Martin, Bernadette Martin-Hisard et Agostino Paravicini Bagliani, Firenze, 2008, p. 427-35 (rist. con aggiornamenti in Id., Il potere del papa. Corporeità, autorappresentazione, simboli, Firenze 2009 [Millennio Medievale, 78. Strumenti e studi, 21], p. 227-36)
- 2009
  - Préface, in Le monde végétal. Médecine, botanique, symbolique. Textes réunis par Agostino Paravicini Bagliani, Firenze, Sismel Edizioni del Galluzzo 009 (Micrologus' Library, 30), p. V-X
  - Paravicini Bagliani Agostino, Le corps du pape. Postface à l'édition française, in Id., Le corps du pape, Paris 1997, 261–68 (rist. con aggiornamenti in Id., Il potere del papa. Corporeità, autorappresentazione, simboli, Firenze 2009 [Millennio Medievale, 78. Strumenti e studi, 21], pp. 1–12)
  - Riflessioni intorno alla paternità baconiana del Liber sex scientiarum, in Vita longa. Vecchiaia e durata della vita nella tradizione medica e aristotelica antica e medievale. Atti del Convegno internazionale (Torino, 13–14 giugno 2008), cur. Chiara Crisciani, Luciana Repici e Pietro B. Rossi, Sismel Edizioni del Galluzzo 2009 (Micrologus' Library, 33)
  - Boniface VIII en images: Vision d’Eglise et mémoire de soi, in Le portrait individuel. Réflexions autour d’une forme de représentation XIIIe-XVe siècles, p. 65–82
  - Introduction, in Entre France et Italie. Mélanges offerts à Pierrette Paravy. Vitalité et rayonnement d’une rencontre, cur. Laurence Ciavaldini Rivière, Anne Lemonde Santamaria, Ilaria Taddei, Grenoble 2009
  - En guise d’introduction. Le pouvoir Pontifical a-t-il besoin des cinq sens?, I cinque sensi = Micrologus. Natura, scienze e società medievali, 10 (2002), IX-XIV (rist. con aggiornamenti in Id., Il potere del papa. Corporeità, autorappresentazione, simboli, Firenze 2009 [Millennio Medievale, 78. Strumenti e studi, 21], p. 13–20)
  - Paravicini Bagliani Agostino, Il rito pontificio di scomunica, da Gregorio VII a Innocenzo III, in Id., Il potere del papa. Corporeità, autorappresentazione, simboli, Firenze 2009, 215–26.
- 2010
  - Introduction, in Il Silenzio/Silence, Micrologus, 18 (2010), VII-X-.
  - Corps, rituels et hiérarchies à la cour de Rome (XIIe-XVe siècle), dans Mythes à la cour, Mythes pour la Cour. Act spubliés par Alain Corbellari, Yasmina Foehr-Janssens, Jean-Claude Mühlethaler, Jean-Yves Tilliette et Barbara Wahlen, Genève 2010 (Publications romanes et françaises, 248), p. 191–206.
  - Il corpo del papa come legittimazione, in Paradoxien der Legitimation. Ergebnisse einer deutsch.itanlienischfranzösischen Villa Vigoni-Konferenz zur Macht im Mittelalter. herausgegeben von Annette Kehnel und Christina Andenna in wissenschaftlicher Zusammenarbeit mit Cécile Caby und Gert Melville, Sismel Edizioni del Galluzzo 2010 (Micrologus' library, 35), p. 43–54.
  - I baci liturgici del papa nel Medioevo. Prime ricerche, in 'Come l'orco della fiaba'. Studi per Franco Cardini, a cura di Marina Montesano, Sismel Edizioni del Galluzzo 2010 (Millennio Medievale, ), p. 533–544.
  - Prefazione, in Pietro Silanos, Gerardo Bianchi da Parma (+ 1302). La biografia di un cardinale-legato duecentesco, Roma 2010, p. XIII-XVII.
  - Prefazione, in Martine Ostorero, Le diable au sabbat. Littérature démonologique et sorcellerie (1440–1460), Sismel Edizioni del Galluzzo 2010 (Micrologus' Library, 38), p. XIII-XV.
  - Rileggendo il Mondo animale di Micrologus. Animalità e umanità nel basso Medioevo, in Uomini, demoni, santi e animali tra Medioevo ed età moderna, p. 77–84.
  - Le dediche alla corte dei papi nel Duecento e l'autocoscienza intellettuale, Filologia mediolatina. Rivista della Fondazione Ezio Franceschini, 17 (2010), p. 69–85.
  - Il rito della scomunica papale, l'impero e il regno (sec. XI-XIII), in Un regno nell'Impero. I caratteri originali del regno normanno nell'età sveva, a cura di P. Cordasco, F. Violante Bari, 2010, p. 181–194.
  - La biblioteca papale nel Due e Trecento, in Storia della Biblioteca Apostolica Vaticana I La biblioteca dei pontefici dall'età antica all'alto Medioevo, a cura di Marco Buonocore, Città del Vaticano 2010, p. 73–108.
  - Le Riviste di storia religiosa in Italia. Appunti per un bilancio storiografico, in Rivista di storia e letteratura religiosa, 46 (2010), p. 443–453.
- 2011
  - Premessa, in Terapie e guarigioni. Convegno internazionale (Ariano Irpino, 5–7 ottobre 2008), a cura di Agostno Paravicini Bagliani, Firenze 2011, p. VII-IX
  - Introduction, in La Misura/Measuring = Micrologus XIX (2011)
  - Ricordo di Claudio Leonardi, in L'esperienza intellettuale di Claudio Leonardi, Firenze Edizioni del Galluzzo 2011
  - Innocenzo III (1198–1216). Visione di papato ed autorappresentazione, in 1212–1214, el trieno que hizo a Europa, p. 183–196
  - Introduzione, in Maria Alessandra Bilotta, I libri dei papi La curia, il Laterano e la produzione manoscritta ad uso del papato nel Medioevo (secoli VI-XIII), Città del Vaticano 2011 (Studi e Testi, 465)
  - Medioevo, in La Biblioteca Apostolica Vaticana luogo di ricerca al servizio degli studi. Atti del Convegno, Roma, 11–13 novembre 2010, cur. Marco Buonocore, Ambrogio M. Piazzoni, Città del Vaticano 2011 (Studi e Testi, 468), p. 143–158.
- 2012
  - Introduction, in Errors and Mistakes. A Cultural History of Fallibility Edited by Mariacarla Gadebusch, Agostino Paravicini Bagliani, Firenze Edizioni del Galluzzo 2012 (Micrologus' Library, 49)
  - In I Francescani e le scienze, Spoleto, Fondazione Centro Italiano di Studi sull'Alto Medioevo, 2012
  - Introduction, in Estremità ed escrescenze del corpo / Extremities and Excrescences of the Body = Micrologus XX (2012)
  - I padri della Chiesa e l'immaginario medievale. Natura e corporeità, in Leggere i Padri tra passato e presente, Firenze Sismel Edizioni del Galluzzo 2012, p. 27–38
  - Art et auto-représentation: la figure du pape entre le XIe et le XIVe siècle, Perspective. La revue de l'INHA, (2012), p. 723–742
  - Introduction, in Adam. Le premier homme. Textes réunis par Agostino Paravicini Bagliani, Firenze Edizioni del Galluzzo 2012 (Micrologus' Library, 45), p. VII-XIV
  - Innocenzo III e la venalità della Curia romana. Per una rilettura dei Gesta Innocentii III, in Hagiologica. Studi per Réginald Grégoire, a cura di Alessandra Bartolomei Romagnoli, Ugo Paoli, Fabriano 2012, p. 61–71
  - I Gesta Innocentii III e la ritualità pontificia. A proposito della prima traduzione italiana della Vita di Innocenzo III, in Studi in onore di Massimo Miglio, I, Roma 2012, p. 201–212
  - La costruzione della monarchia papale, in Il contributo italiano alla storia del pensiero : Diritto. Ottava Appendice, Roma, Istituto della Enciclopedia Italiana, 2012, p. 67–73. http://www.treccani.it/enciclopedia/la-costruzione-della-monarchia-papale(Il-Contributo-italiano-alla-storia-del-Pensiero:-Diritto)/
  - Le pape peut-il tomber dans l’erreur? A propos du rituel de canonisation au Moyen Âge, in Errors and Mistakes. A Cultural History of Fallibility. Edited by Mariacarla Gadebusch, Agostino Paravicini Bagliani, Firenze Edizioni del Galluzzo 2012 (Micrologus' Library, 49), p. 149–163.
- 2013
  - Introduction, in The Medieval Legends of Philosophers and Scholars = Micrologus, 21 (2013) (in corso di stampa).
  - La légende médiévale d’Albert le Grand (1270–1435). Premières recherches, in The Medieval Legends of Philosophers and Scholars = Micrologus, 21 (2013), p. 295–368
  - Il rito pontificio di canonizzazione e l’inerranza della Chiesa (forthcoming)
  - Ist Europa ein Konzept für das Papsttum im Mittelalter?, p. 23–34 (forthcoming)
  - Anneliese Maier und ihre Forschungen an der Biblioteca Apostolica Vaticana, p. 107–109 (forthcoming)
  - Hat das Papsttum seiner plenitudo potestatis Grenzen gesetzt? (1050–1300)
  - Conclusion, in Être médecin à la cour (Italie, France, Espagne, XIIIe-XVIIIe siècle). Textes réunis par E. Andretta, M. Nicoud, Firenze, Sismel Edizioni del Galluzzo 2013 (Micrologus' Library, 52), p. 259–268.
  - Préface, in Amicorum Societas. Mélanges offerts à François Dolbeau pour son 65e anniversaire. Études réunies par J. Elfassi, C. Lanéry, A.-M. Turcan-Verkerk, Firenze, Sismel Edizioni del Galluzzo 2013, p. XIII-XIV.
  - Boniface VIII e l’Eucharistie, in Amicorum Societas. Mélanges offerts à François Dolbeau pour son 65e anniversaire. Études réunies par J. Elfassi, C. Lanéry, A.-M. Turcan-Verkerk, Firenze, Sismel Edizioni del Galluzzo 2013, p. 515–526.
  - Caducità fisica e durata del mandato del papa. Retorica e ritualità medievali, Italianieuropei, 5/6 (2013), p. 126–131.
  - Il papato e il demonio. Per una rilettura di alcune lettere pontificie del Due e Trecento, in Il diavolo nel Medioevo. Atti del XLIX Convegno storico internazionale, Todi, Centro italiano di studi sul basso Medioevo – Accademia Tudertina, 2013, p. 101–115.
  - Il rito pontificio di canonizzazione e l’inerranza della Chiesa, in La canonizzazione di Santa Francesca Romana. Santità, cultura e istituzioni a Roma tra Medioevo ed età moderna. Atti del Convegno internazionale. Roma, 19–21 novembre 2009, a cura di A. Bartolomei Romagnoli, G. Picasso, Firenze, Sismel Edizioni del Galluzzo 2013, p. 3–19.
  - Grégoire VII et l’excommunication. A propos des figures des apôtres Pierre et Paul sur les bulles pontificales, dans L’image en questions: Pour Jean Wirth, éd. Fr. Elsig, Genève 2013, 120–29.
- 2014
  - «Le Corps du Pape», vingt ans après, in Le Corps du Prince = Micrologus. Nature, Sciences and Medieval Societies, 22 (2014), p. 13–36.
  - Conoscenza e uso del greco e dell'arabo alla corte papale del Duecento. Diplomazia e scienza a confronto, in Gli Italiani e la Terrasanta, ed. A. Musarra, praef. F. Cardini, Firenze, Edizioni del Galluzzo 2014, p. 5–26.
  - Premessa, in Auctor et auctoritas in latinis Medii Aevi litteris. Author and Authorship in Medieval Latin Literature, ed. E. D'Angelo, J. Jolkowski, Firenze, Sismel Edizioni del Galluzzo, 2014.
- 2015
  - «Papa maior est angelis». Intorno ad una dottrina culmine della plenitudo potestatis del papa, in Angelos – Angelus. From the Antiquity to the Middle Ages = Micrologus. Nature, Sciences and Medieval Societies, 23 (2015), p. 365–408.
  - Boniface VIII, violence du verbe et émotivité, in Passions et pulsions à la cour (Moyen Âge – Temps modernes). Textes réunis par Bernard Andenmatten, Armand Jamme, Laurence Moulier-Brogi et Marilyn Nicoud, Firenze, Sismel Edizioni del Galluzzo 2015 (Micrologus' Library, 68), p. 24–71.
  - La papauté médiévale entre la norme et la légitimité implicite, in La légitimité implicite, vol. I, Paris-Rome 2015 (Le pouvoir symbolique en Occident (1300–1640), 1), p. 67–74.
  - Conclusion, in Innocent III et le Midi, Toulouse 2015 (Cahiers de Fanjeaux, 50), p. 467–481.
  - Préface, in Le cheval dans la culture médiévale. Textes réunis par B. Andenmatten, A. Paravicini Bagliani et E. Pibiri, Firenze, Sismel Edizioni del Galluzzo 2015 (Micrologus' Library, 69), p. VII-XI.
  - Le cheval blanc du pape. Symbolique et autoreprésentation (XIIe-XIIIe siècles), in Le cheval dans la culture médiévale. Textes réunis par B. Andenmatten, A. Paravicini Bagliani et E. Pibiri, Firenze, Sismel Edizioni del Galluzzo 2015 2015 (Micrologus' Library, 69), p. 243–265.
  - Presentazione: G. Pomaro, I manoscritti medievali della Biblioteca Capitolare Feliniana di Lucca, Firenze, Sismel Edizioni del Galluzzo 2015 (Biblioteche e Archivi, 28).
  - Premessa. Il processo di canonizzazione di Celestino V. A cura A. Bartolomei Romagnoli, A. Marini, Firenze, Sismel Edizioni del Galluzzo 2015 (Corpus Coelestinianum, vol. I/1), p. VII-IX.
  - Introduction, in Parfums et odeurs au Moyen Âge, Science usage, symboles. Textes réunis par A. Paravicini Bagliani, Firenze, Sismel Edizioni del Galluzzo 2015 (Micrologus' Library, 67), p. VII-XVI.

=== Collaborations ===
- 1993
  - Histoire du christianisme des origines à nos jours, dir. Jean-Marie Mayeur, Charles Pietri, André Vauchez, Marc Venard, vol. 5, Paris, Desclée, A. Fayard (ital. trans.: Storia del cristianesimo, dir. Jean-Marie Mayeur, ital. ed. by Giuseppe Alberigo, Rome, Borla, Città nuova, 1997–2005).
- 1994
  - Dictionnaire historique de la papauté, dir. Philippe Levillain, Paris, Fayard
- 1997
  - Dictionnaire encyclopédique du Moyen Age, dir. André Vauchez, with the collaboration of Catherine Vincent, Paris, Ed. du Cerf
- 2000
  - Enciclopedia dei papi, 3 vols., Rome, Istituto dell’Enciclopedia Italiana

== See also ==
- Bruno Laurioux
