= Rudelle (surname) =

Rudelle is a surname. Notable people with the surname include:

- Odile Rudelle (1936–2013), French historian
- Pierre-Marie Rudelle (1932–2015), French artist
