= Verdet =

Verdet may refer to:

People

- Émile Verdet (1824–1866), French physicist
- Ilie Verdeț (1925–2001), Romanian politician
- Jean-Pierre Verdet (born 1932), French astronomer and historian of astronomy

Wine grape varieties

- Arbois (grape)
- Gouais blanc
