= Gift (law) =

Concept in property law

A gift, in the law of property, is the voluntary and immediate transfer of property from one person (the donor or grantor) to another (the donee or grantee) without consideration. There are several type of gifts in property law, most notably inter vivos gifts which are made in the donor's lifetime and causa mortis (deathbed) gifts which are made in expectation of the donor's imminent death. Both types of gifts share three elements which must be met in order for the gift to be legally effective: donative intent (the intention of the donor to give the gift to the donee), the delivery of the gift to the donee, and the acceptance of the gift. In addition to those elements, causa mortis gifts require that the donor must die of the impending peril that they had contemplated when making the gift.

== Inter vivos gifts ==
An inter vivos gift is an ordinary gift of personal property from one living person to another. It can be a gift of a present or future interest in a property. The three elements of an inter vivos gift are donative intent, delivery, and acceptance. The rules governing these elements were historically rigid but in recent years courts have become more lenient in their application by ignoring or circumventing the formal delivery requirement and elevating the importance of donative intent. Acceptance of a valuable gift is typically presumed by courts and thus is rarely a legal issue.

=== Donative intent ===
The donor of the gift must have a present intent to make a gift of the property to the donee. A promise to make a gift in the future is unenforceable, and legally meaningless, even if the promise is accompanied by a present transfer of the physical property in question.

Suppose, for example, that a person gives a friend a ring and tells them that it is for their next birthday and to hold on to it until then. The person has not made a gift, and could legally demand the ring back at any time before the friend's birthday because an immediate transfer has not occurred. In contrast, suppose a person gives a friend a deed and tells them it will be in their best interest if the deed stays in the giver's safe-deposit box. The person has made a gift and would be unable to legally reclaim it because they have given the friend a present interest in the deed. There is a special exception for engagement rings which most states recognize: the transfer of an engagement ring is subject "to an implied condition that the marriage occur", thus if the engagement ends without a marriage, the giver of the engagement ring is entitled to revoke the gift.

=== Delivery ===
The gift must be delivered to the donee. If the gift is of a type that cannot be delivered in the conventional sense – a house, or a bank account – the delivery can be effected by a constructive delivery, wherein a tangible item allowing access to the gift – a deed or key to the house, a passbook for the bank account – is delivered instead. Symbolic delivery is also sometimes permissible where manual delivery is impractical, such as the delivery of a key that does not open anything, but is intended to symbolize the transfer of ownership.

Certain forms of property must be transferred following particular formalities described by statute law. In England, real property must be transferred by a written deed. The transfer of equitable interests must be performed in writing by the owner or their agent.

A gift is assumed when property owner deeds real estate as joint tenants with rights of survivorship. Regardless of contribution to purchase price, such a deed guarantees each tenant equal shares upon sale or partition of the property.

=== Acceptance ===
The donee must accept the gift in order for the property transfer to take place. However, because people generally accept gifts, acceptance will be presumed, so long as the donee does not expressly reject the gift. A rejection of the gift destroys the gift, so that a donee cannot revive a once-rejected gift by later accepting it. In order for such an acceptance to be effective, the donor would have to extend the offer of the gift again.

== Types ==
Gifts can also be either:

=== causa mortis ===
- Deathbed gifts (gift causa mortis, donatio mortis causa). In the law of England and Wales, this is a gift made in expectation of the donor's imminent death when it is contemplated that there is insufficient time to formalise the gift in a will. A gift causa mortis is not effective unless the donor dies of the impending peril that they had contemplated when making the gift. The donor must actually part with the property, but the gift is revocable if they do not subsequently die.

Gifts can also be:

=== outright ===
- outright – made free of any restrictions, such as being subject to a trust;

=== onerous ===
- onerous – made with a burden or obligation imposed on the donee; or

=== remunerative ===
- remunerative – made to compensate for services rendered

== Taxation ==
=== In India ===
In India, previously there was Gift Tax Act under which donor had to pay the gift tax on the amount of gift. However, the said Act has been abolished and from FY 2004–05, a new provision was inserted in the Income Tax Act (1961) under section 56 (2) which provides that if the gift is received by an individual or Hindu undivided family from any relatives or blood relatives or at the time of marriage or as inheritance or in contemplation of death, it will not be taxable. In all other cases if the aggregate of gifts received exceeds Rs 50,000 in a year, the gift will be taxable as income from other source.

=== United Kingdom ===
Gifts into a trust above a certain value (known as the nil rate band which is currently £325,000 but this limit may be reduced by certain gifts made in the last 7 years) are generally subject to inheritance tax in the United Kingdom though at the reduced rate of inheritance tax of 20% rather than the full rate of 40%. There are certain reliefs that may apply to reduce or eliminate the IHT due including business property relief and agricultural property relief. Gifts to individuals are generally not subject to inheritance tax unless the donor dies within 7 years of the date of the gift. There is anti-avoidance legislation to prevent assets being gifted but with the donor retaining a benefit from the asset (for example the gift of the main residence while continuing to live in it will be ineffective from an IHT perspective unless market value rent is charged). Gifts in life may be a way to circumvent inheritance tax on death.

== See also ==
- Re Cole.
- Johnson v Buttress [1936] HCA 41, (1936) 56 CLR 113 (17 August 1936), High Court (Australia)
- Knapp v Knapp
- Gift tax
- Donation (Catholic canon law)
