= Claire Sotinel =

Ancient historian

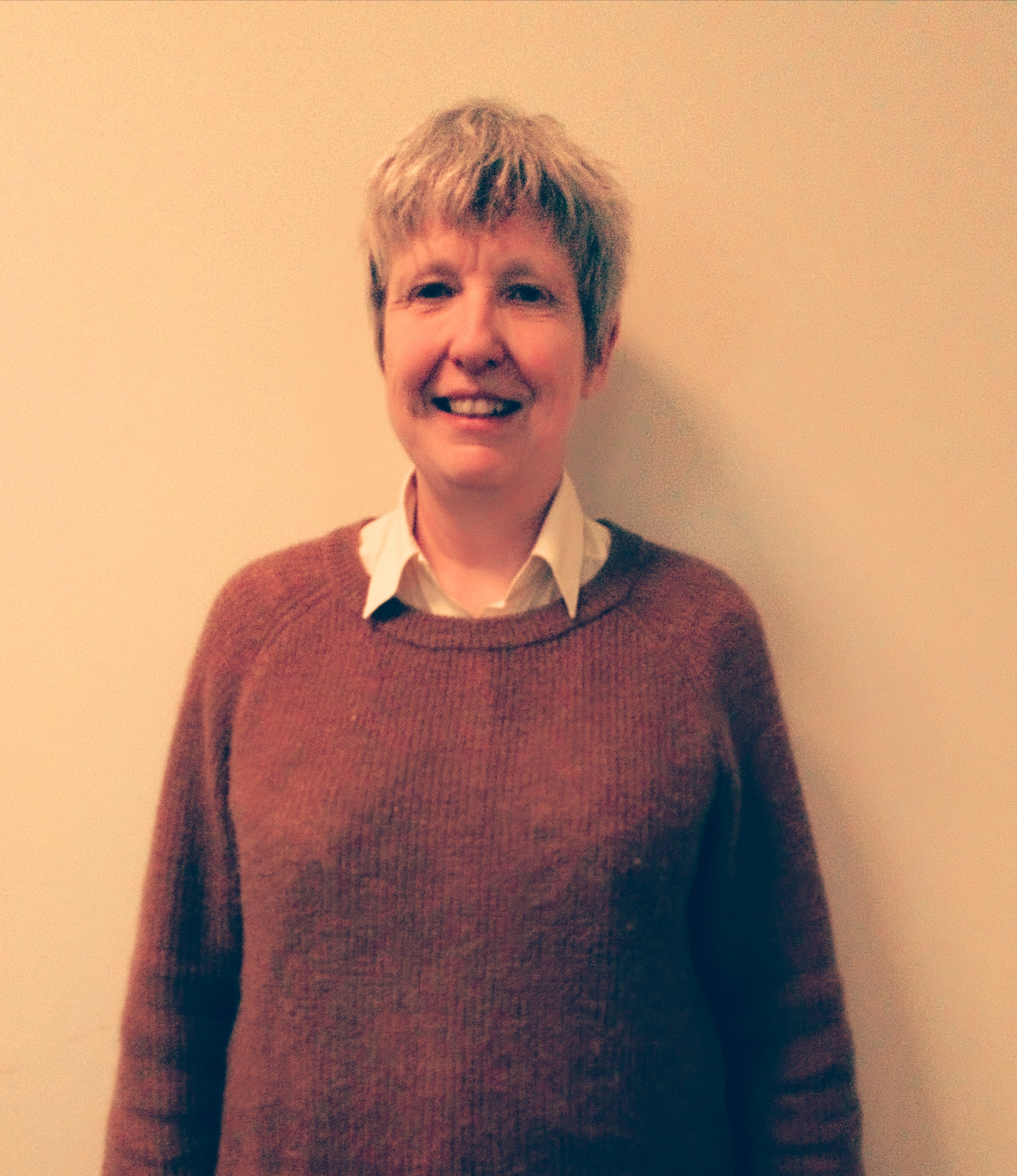
Professor Claire Sotinel

Claire Sotinel is a Professor of Ancient History at l'Université de Paris-Est Créteil (Paris 12 Val de Marne University). She is an expert on Italy in late antiquity, religion, society, and prosopography.

== Education ==
Sotinel received her PhD from Paris-Sorbonne University in 1993. Her doctoral thesis was entitled La Vénétie chrétienne au VIe siècle (The Christian City of Venice in the Sixth Century). Her PhD was supervised by Luce Pietri.

== Career ==
Sotinel was a lecturer at the University of Bordeaux-III 1994–2004. She was appointed Professor of Roman History at the François Rabelais University, Tours, in 2004. She was appointed as Professor of Ancient History at l'Université de Paris-Est Créteil in 2008.

Sotinel was a contributor to the Prosopographie chrétienne du Bas-Empire, an international project to create a prosopography of early Christianity, initiated in 1951 by H. I. Marrou and continued by Andre Mandouze in 1978 after Marrou's death. The Prosopographie was divided geographically, and Sointel contributed to the weighty two-volume prosopography on Italy (313–604), edited by Charles Pietri and Luce Pietri published in 1999. The Prosopographie chrétienne du Bas-Empire has transformed the study of late antiquity.

Sotinel publishes research in French, German and English. Her work has been described as 'insightful', 'thorough', and 'incisive', as well as 'detailed' and 'brilliant'. Her theoretical approach understands a 'transformation' of late antiquity rather than a catastrophic failure.

At l'Université de Paris-Est Créteil she is a Director of Research.

Sotinel was a By-fellow of Churchill College, University of Cambridge in 2001, and was a Visiting Fellow of All Souls College, University of Oxford in 2008.

Sotinel is a member of SopHAU (Society for Professors of Ancient History in Universities) and of the French Academy in Rome. She is vice-president of the jury of the Château de Cheverny Historical Comics Prize.

== Bibliography ==
=== Monographs and edited volumes ===
- Church and Society in Late Antique Italy and beyond, Variorum, Ashgate, 2010.
- Éric Rebillard, Claire Sotinel (éd.), Les frontières du profane dans l’Antiquité tardive, Rome, École française de Rome, 2010.
- Claire Sotinel et Maurice Sartre (éd.), L’usage du passé dans l’Antiquité tardive. Hommage à Brigitte Beaujard, Rennes, 2008.
- Identité civique et christianisme: Aquilée du IIIe au VIe siècle (BEFAR 324), Rome, Ecole française de Rome, 2005.
- Claire Sotinel and Éric Rebillard, L'évêque dans la cité. Image et autorité (1998)
- Rhétorique de la faute et pastorale de la réconciliation (Ecole française de Rome 1994)

=== Articles and book chapters ===
- "Christianisme antique et religion civique en Occident", in A. Busine (éd.), Religious Practices and Christianization of the Late Antique City (4th-7th cent.), Leyden, Boston, 2015 (Religions in the Graeco-Roman World, 182), pp. 19–37.
- "Ne pas se souvenir d’Ambroise. L’effacement de la référence ambrosienne en Italie du Nord au VIe siècle", in P. Boucheron, St. Gioanni (éd.), La mémoire d’Ambroise de Milan. Usages politiques et sociaux d’une autorité patristique en Italie (Ve-XVIIIe siècle), Paris, 2015, pp. 243–250.
- "Le culte de sainte Agnès à place Navone entre Antiquité et Moyen Age. Introduction", Mélanges de l’École française de Rome-Moyen Âge, 126, 1 (2014), [En ligne], mis en ligne le 03 avril 2014, URL : http://mefrm.revues.org/1700; DOI : 10.4000/mefrm.1700.
- "From Belenus to Peter and Paul. Christianity and the Protection of the City in Late Antiquity", in Ted Kaizer, Anna Leone, Edmund Thomas and Robert Witcher (dir.), Cities and Gods. Religious Space in Transition, BABESCH (Bulletin antieke beschaving. Annual papers on Mediterranean Archaeology) suppl. 22, Leuven, 2013, pp. 139–150.
- "La localisation des événements dans les chroniques de l’Antiquité tardive”, Geographia Antica. Rivista di geografia stroica del mondo antico e di storia della geografia, 22-21 (2011–2012), pp. 153–162.
- "La fraternité dans le christianisme antique", in G. Bertrand, C. Brice et G. Montègre (dir.), Fraternité. Pour une histoire du concept, Cahiers du "Centre de recherche en histoire et histoire de l'art. Italie, pays alpins" 20, 2012, pp. 73-82.
- "Augustine’s Information circuits”, in M. Vessey (dir.), A Companion to Augustine, Blackwell-Wiley, 2012, pp. 125–137.
