= Florence Charterhouse =

Carthusian monastery in Galluzzo, Florence

Coordinates: 43°43′53″N 11°13′17″E

- Certosa di Firenze
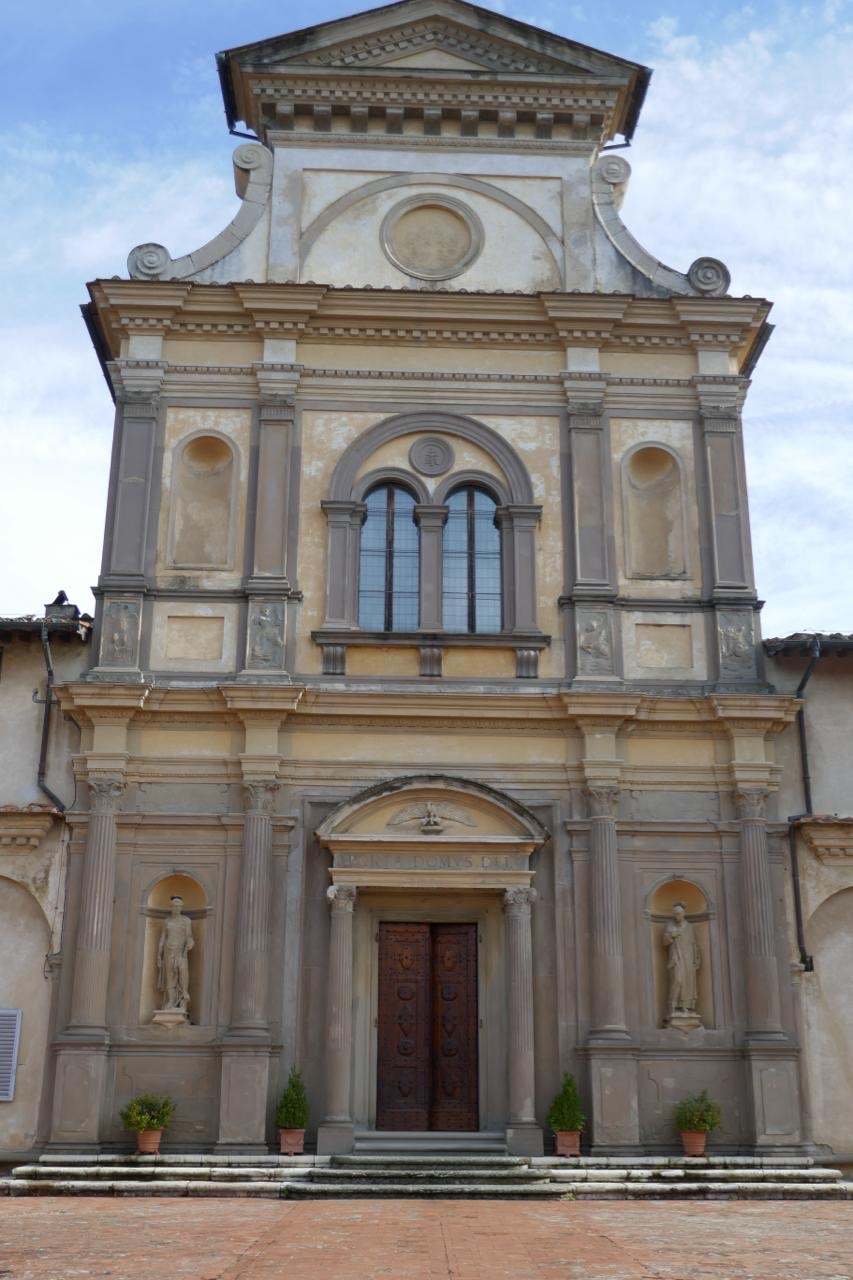
- Interactive map of Florence Charterhouse

Monastery information
- Order: Carthusian
- Established: 1341
- Dedicated to: Saint Lawrence
- Country: Italy

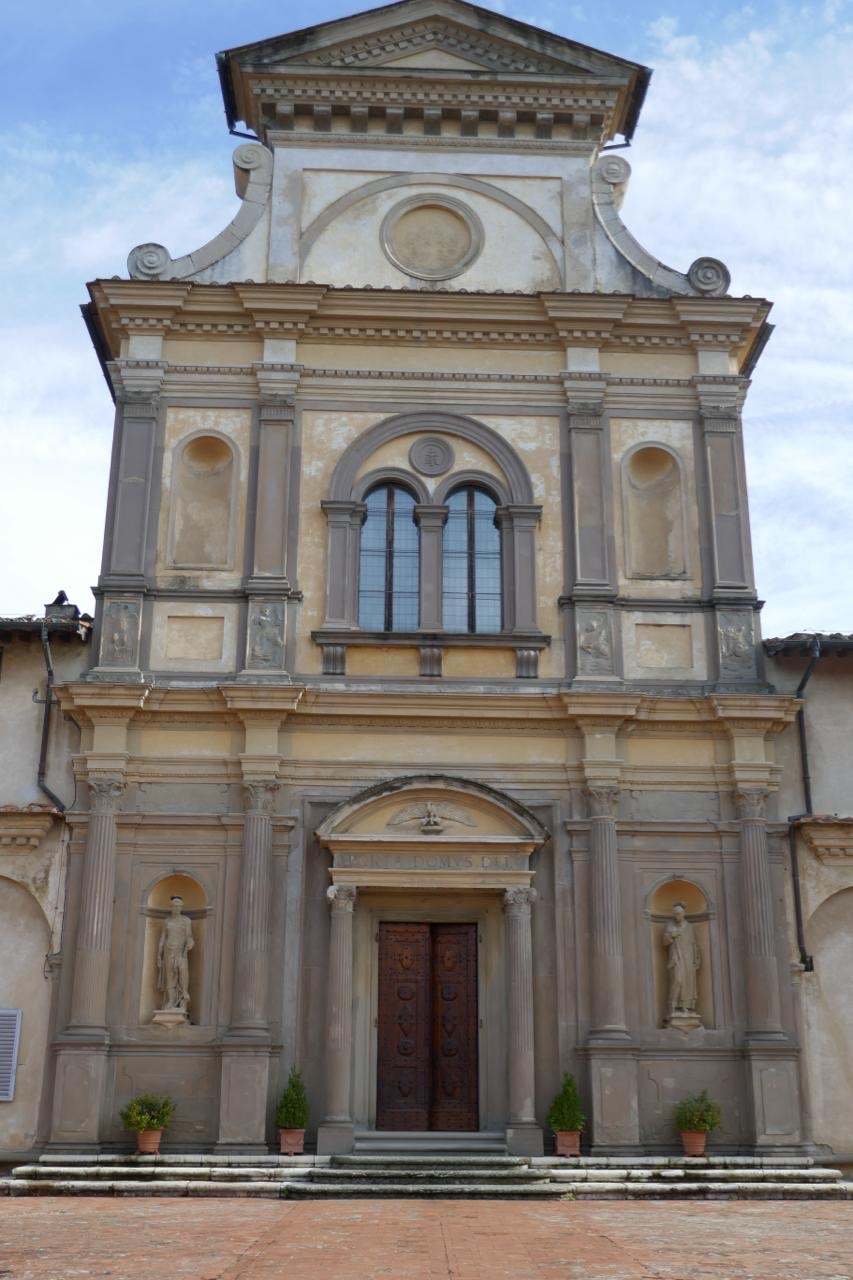
Facade of the main church at Florence Charterhouse

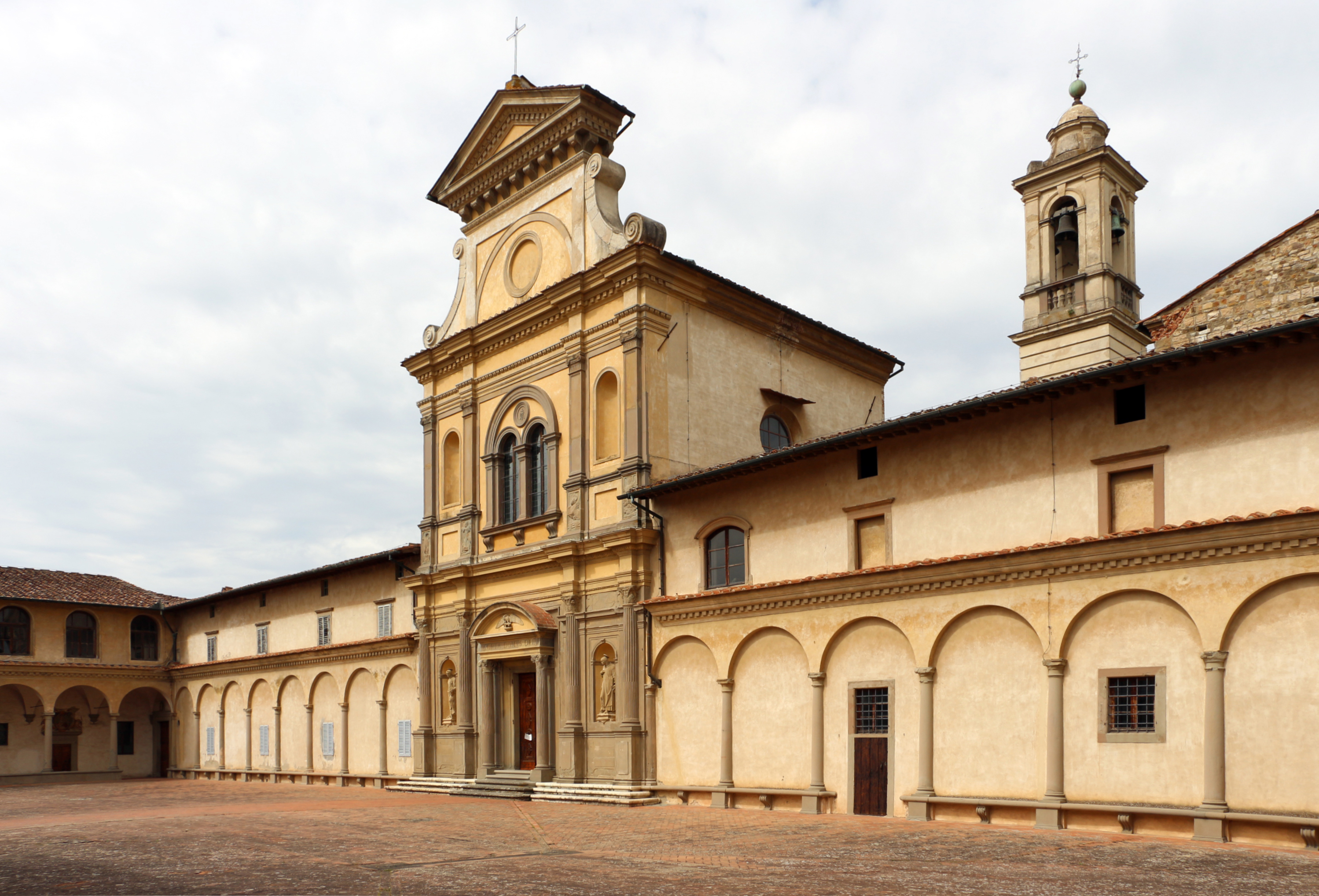
Florence Charterhouse church

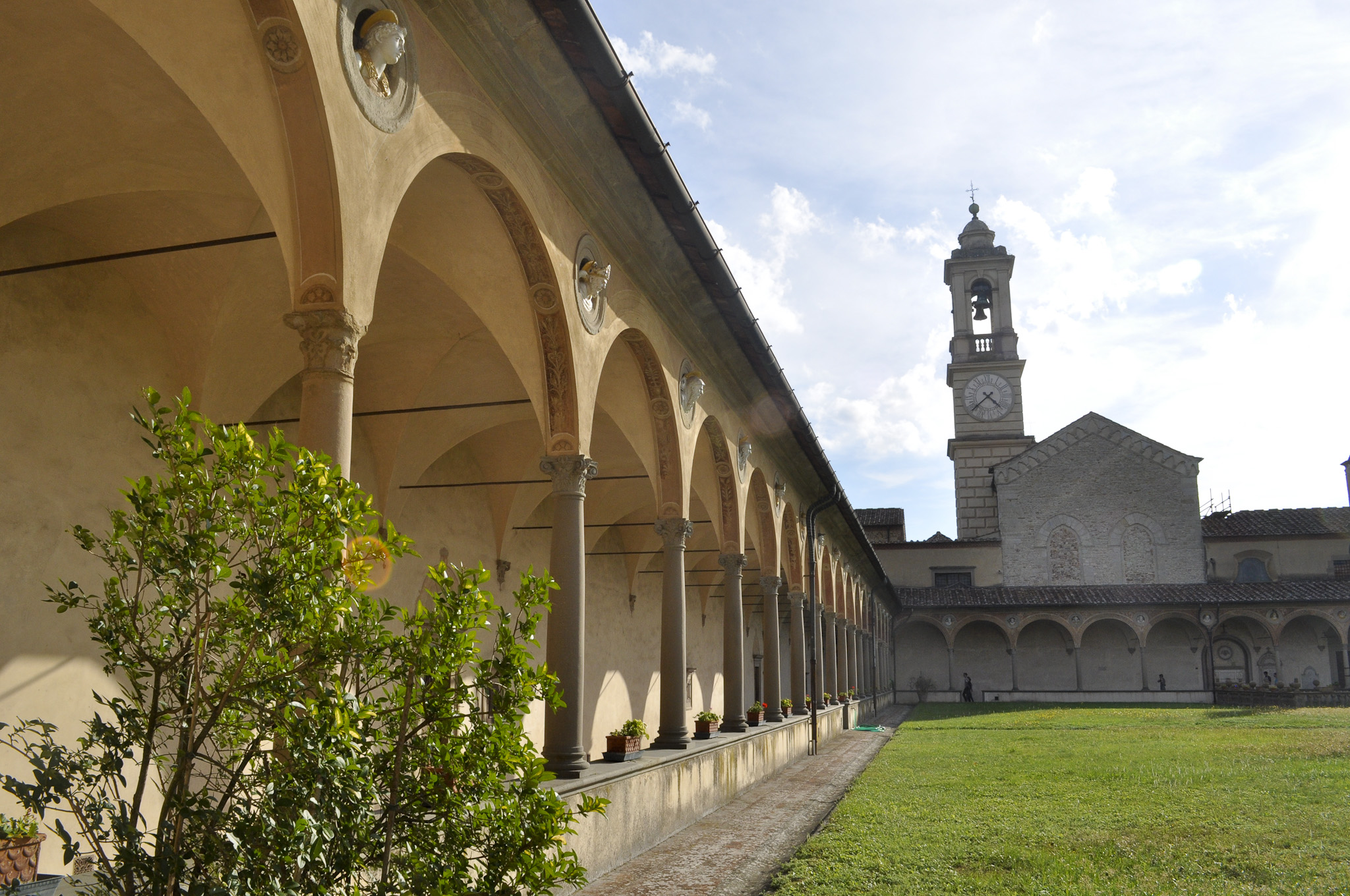
The courtyard of the monastery

Florence Charterhouse (Certosa di Firenze or Certosa del Galluzzo) is a charterhouse, or Carthusian monastery, located in Galluzzo, a suburb of Florence, in central Italy. The building is a walled complex located on Monte Acuto, at the point of confluence of the Ema and Greve rivers.

The charterhouse was founded in 1341 by the Florentine noble Niccolò Acciaioli, Grand Seneschal of the Kingdom of Naples, but continued to expand over the centuries as the recipient of numerous donations. The monastery was also named "Palazzo agli Studi" (Palace to the Studies) as Acciaioli wanted to build a school of theology and philosophy attached to it.

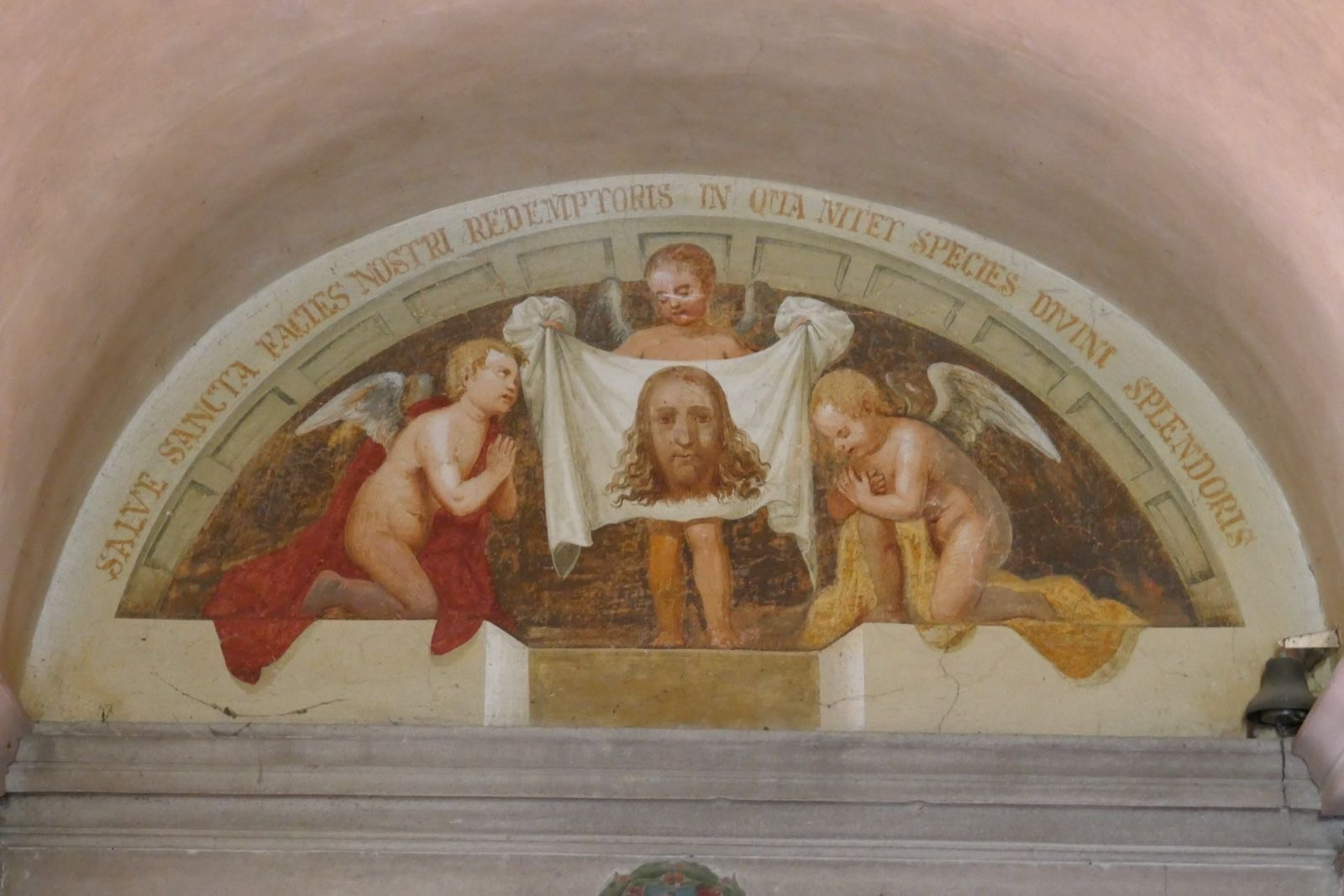
Acheiropoeita at the Florence Charterhouse

It is dedicated to the martyr Saint Lawrence.

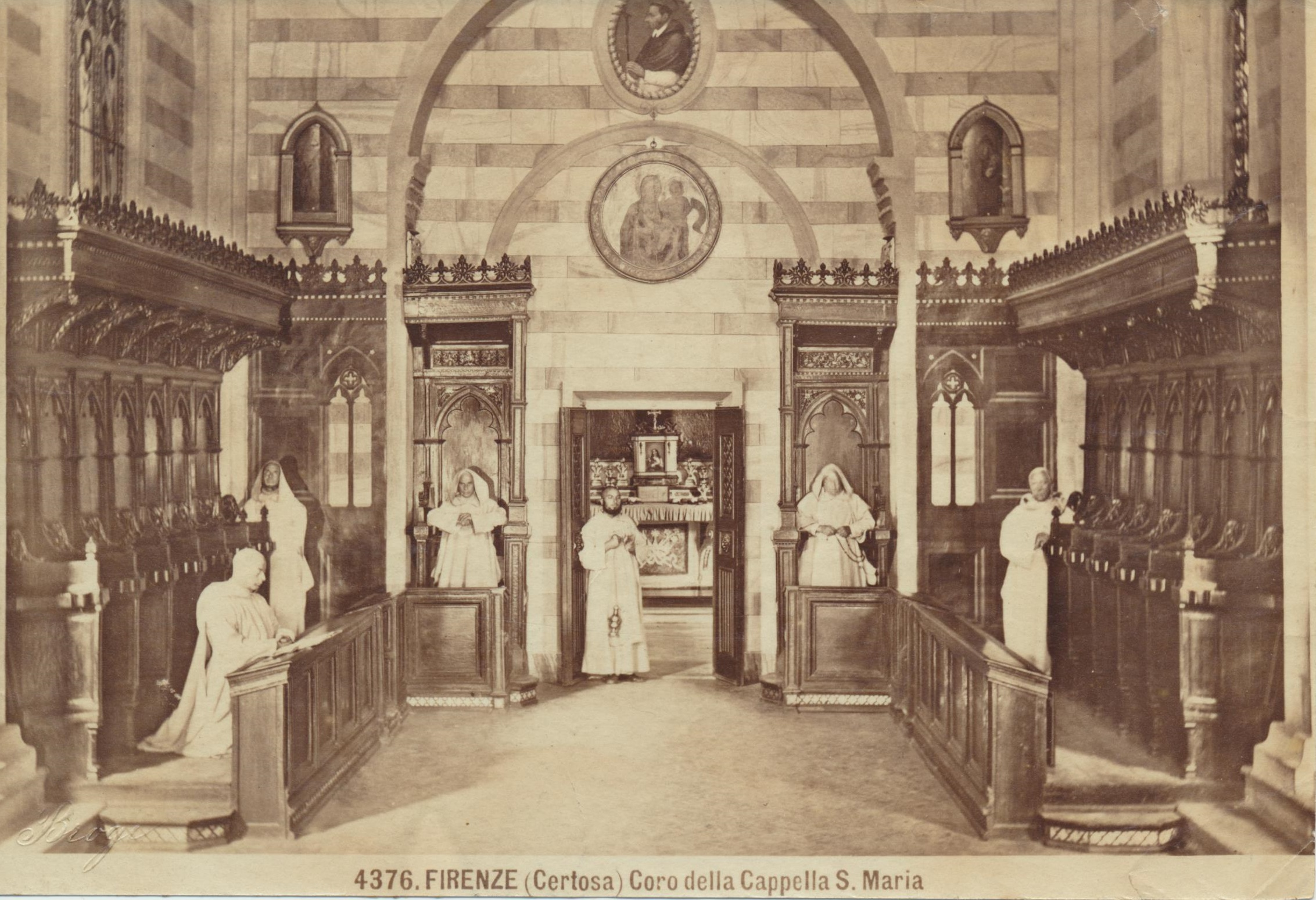
Florence, Certosa, Charterhouse, chapel, ca.1878

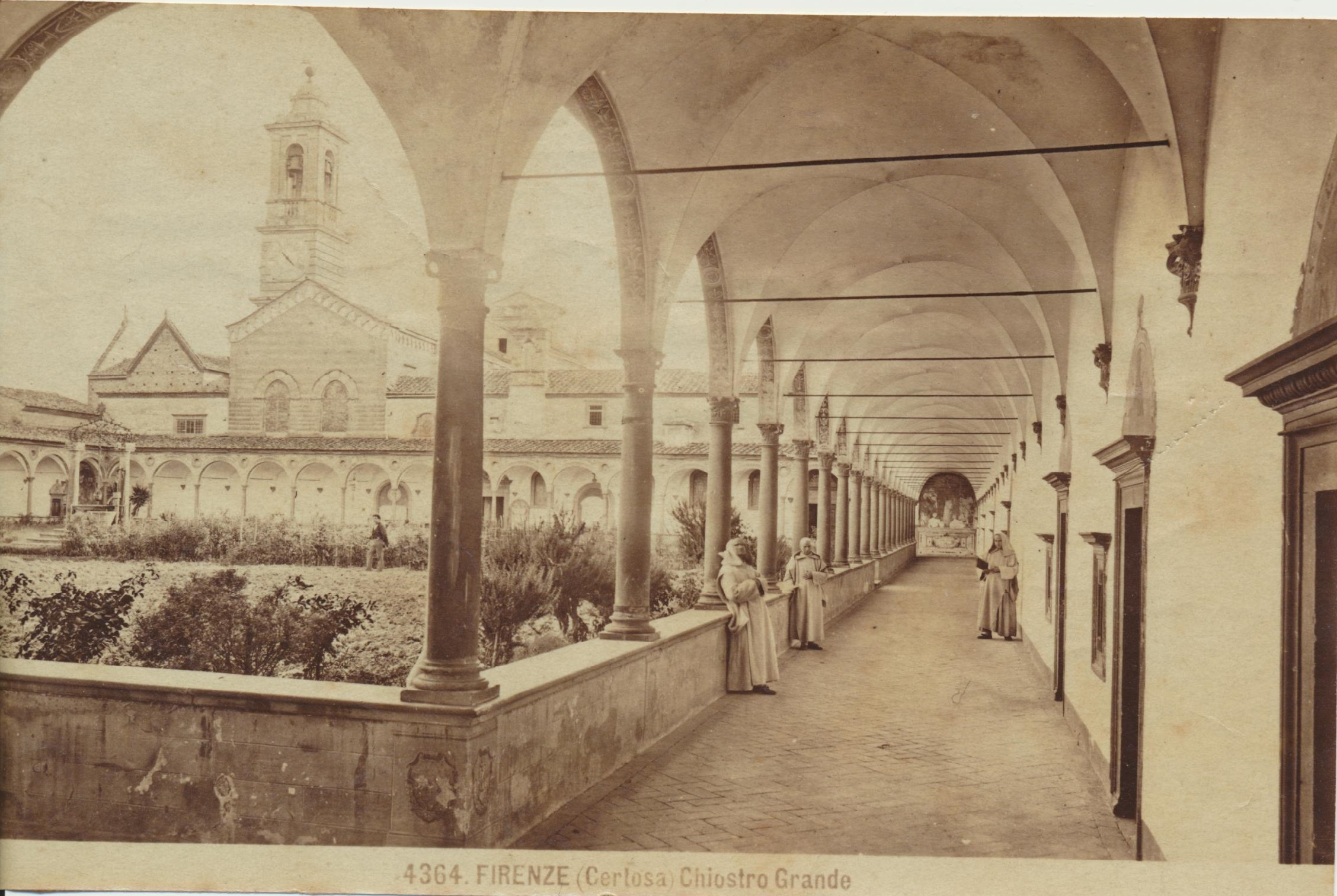
Florence, Certosa, Charterhouse, cloister, ca.1878

In 1958 the monastery was taken over by Cistercian monks.

The chapter house now holds five lunettes with frescoes by Pontormo from the cloister, damaged by exposure to the elements.

The charterhouse inspired Le Corbusier for his urban projects.

The monastery houses the International Society for the Study of Medieval Latin Culture (Società Internazionale per lo Studio del Medioevo Latino, SISMEL), an Italian non-profit cultural institute.

== Passion of Christ (Pontormo) ==
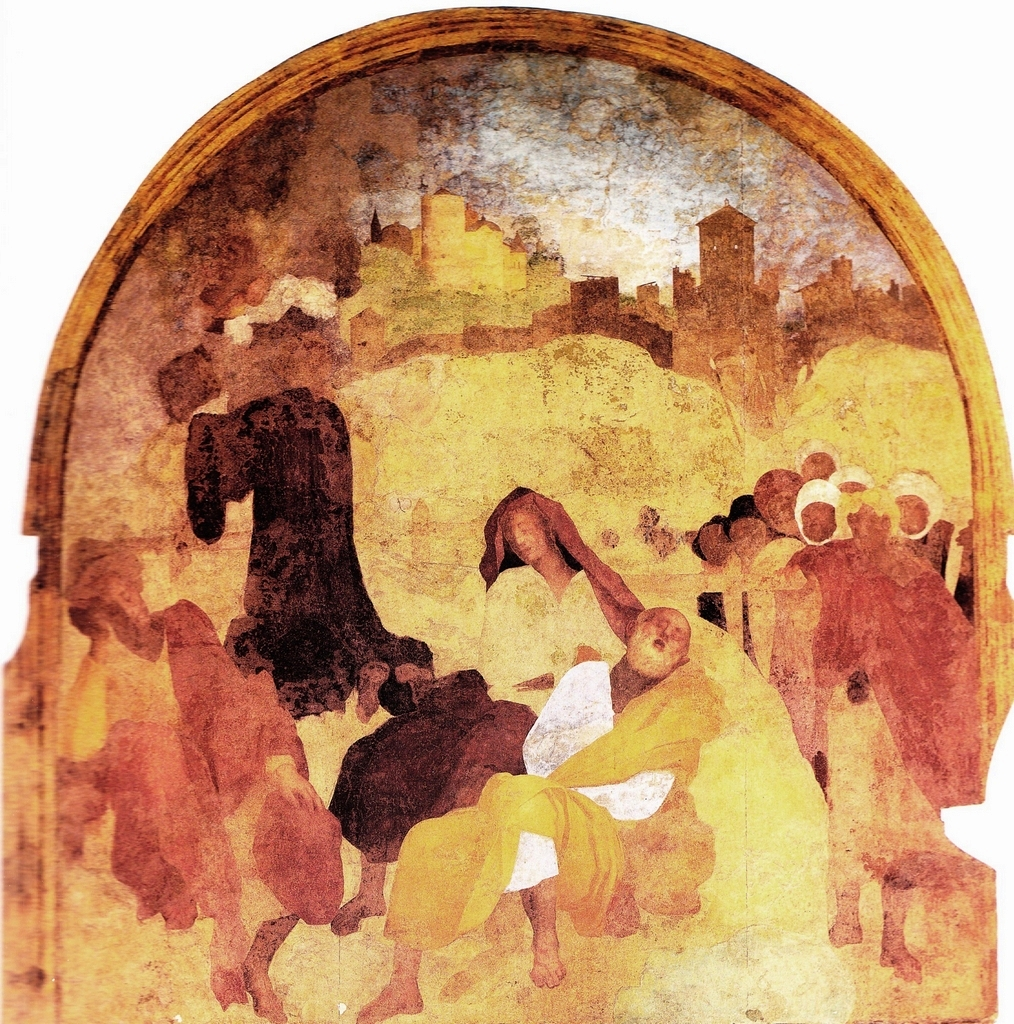
Agony in the Garden

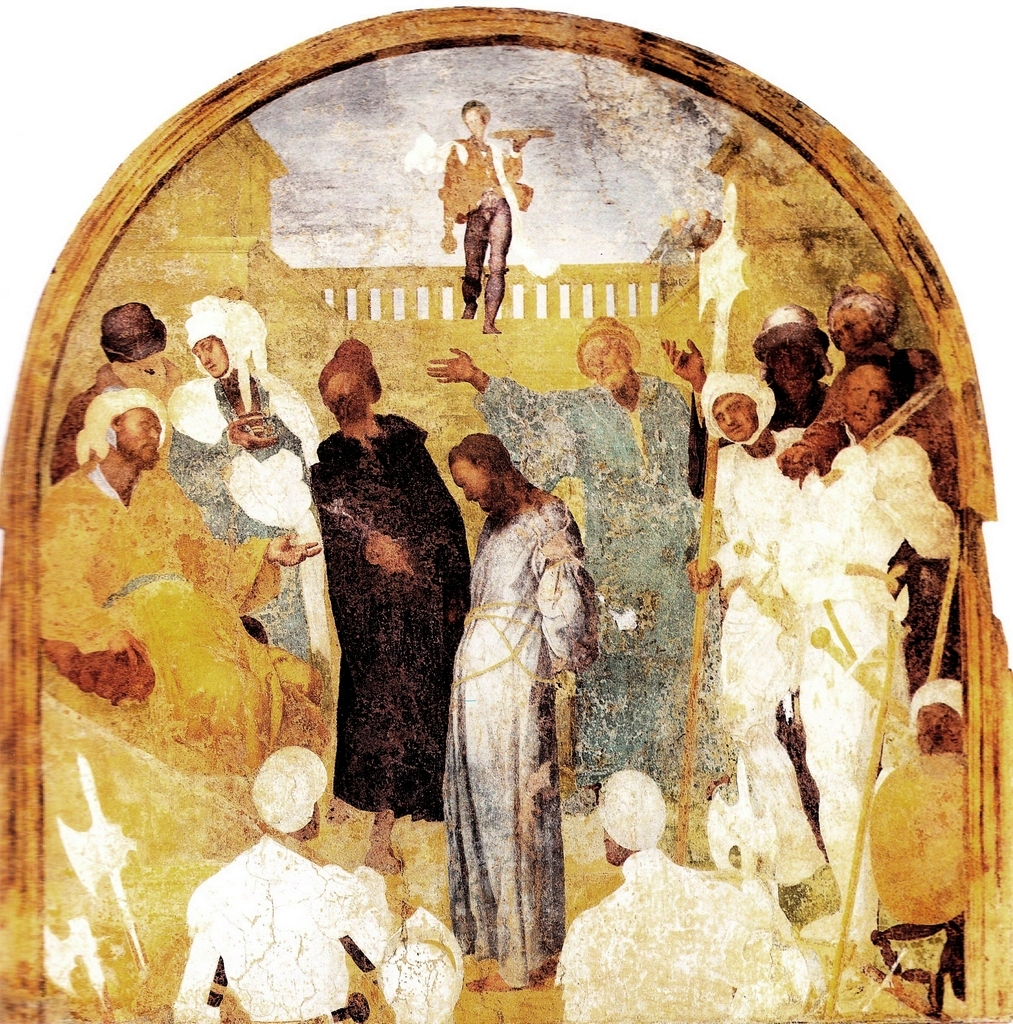
Christ Before Pilate

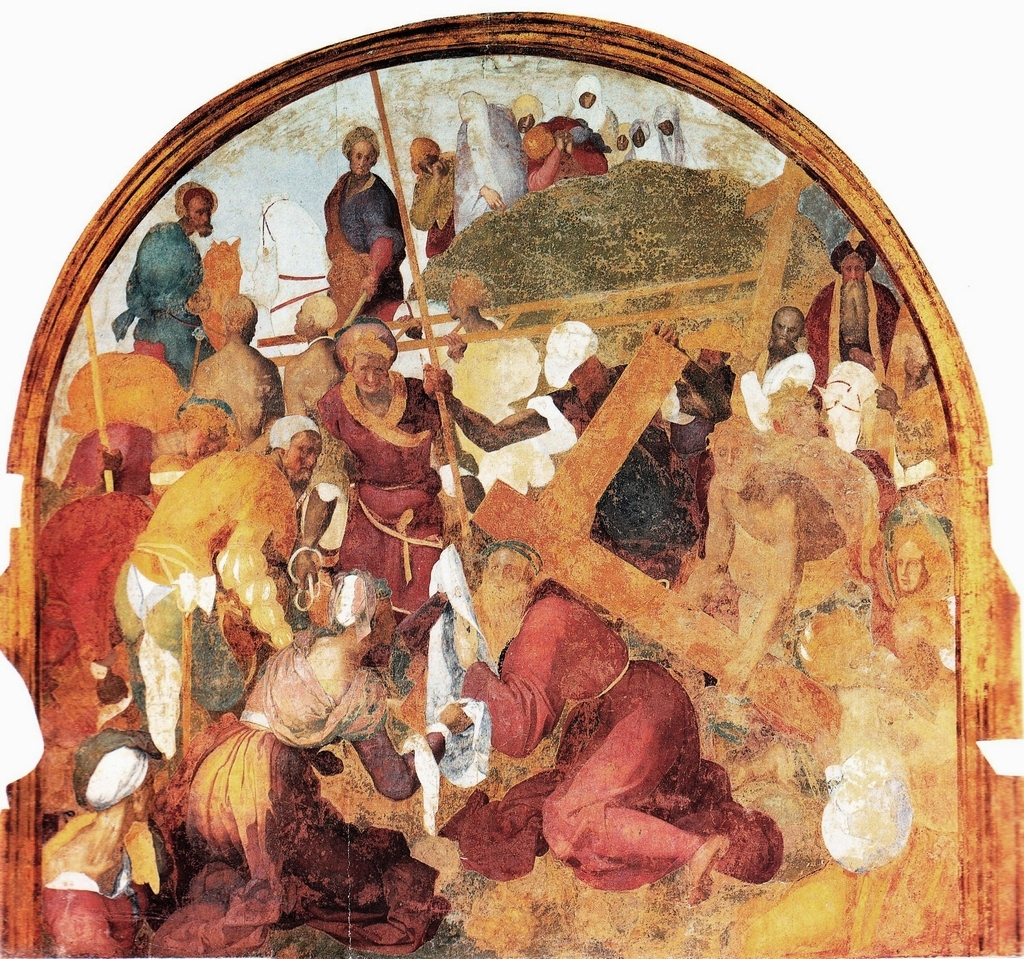
Christ Carries His Cross

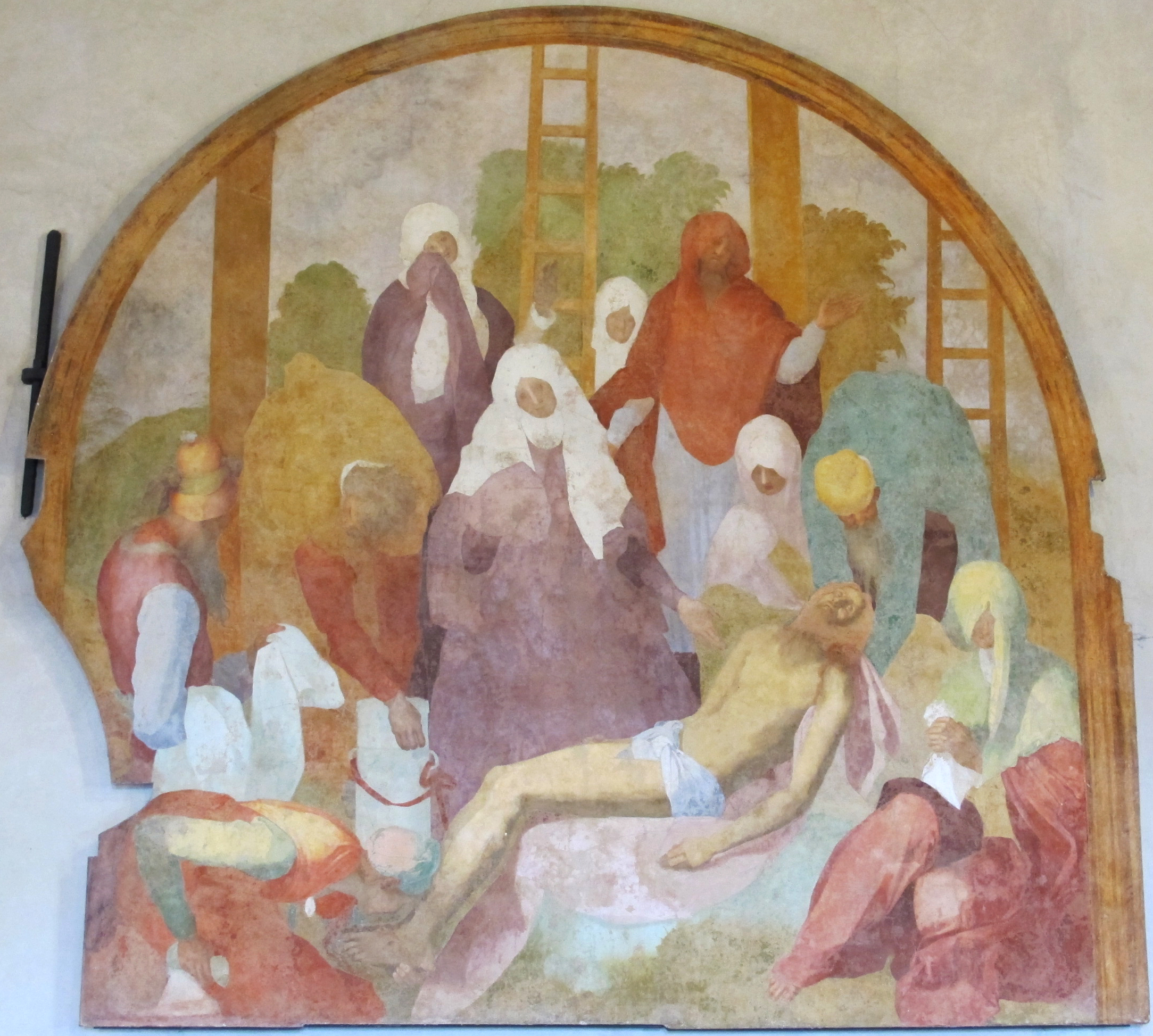
Deposition

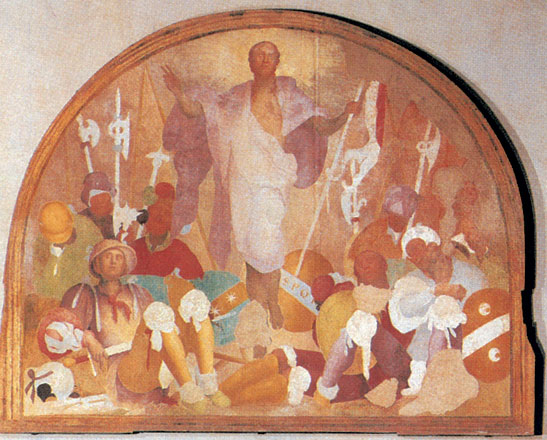
Resurrection

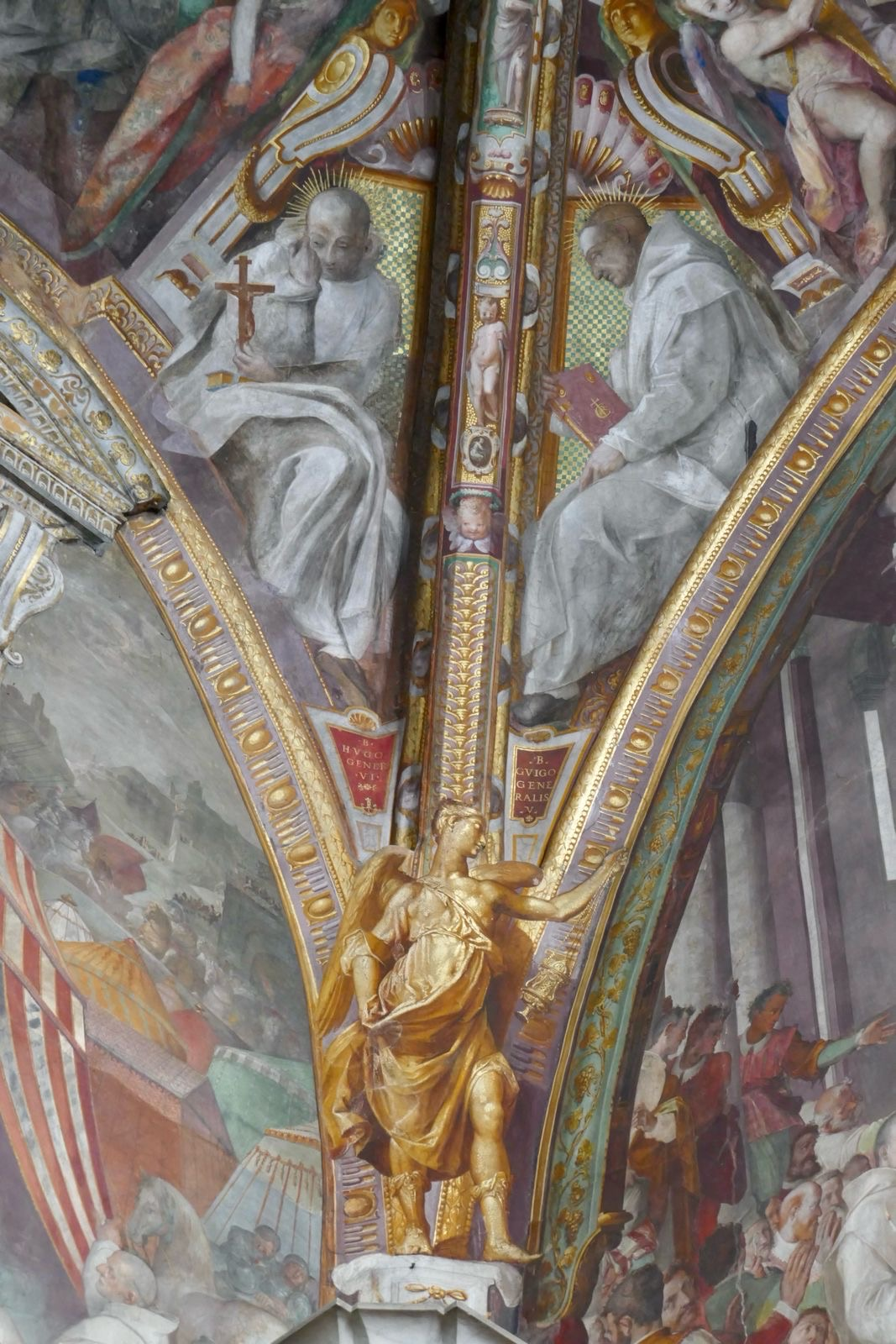
Corner ceiling painting over the main altar of the Florence Charterhouse
