= International Society for the Study of Medieval Latin Culture =

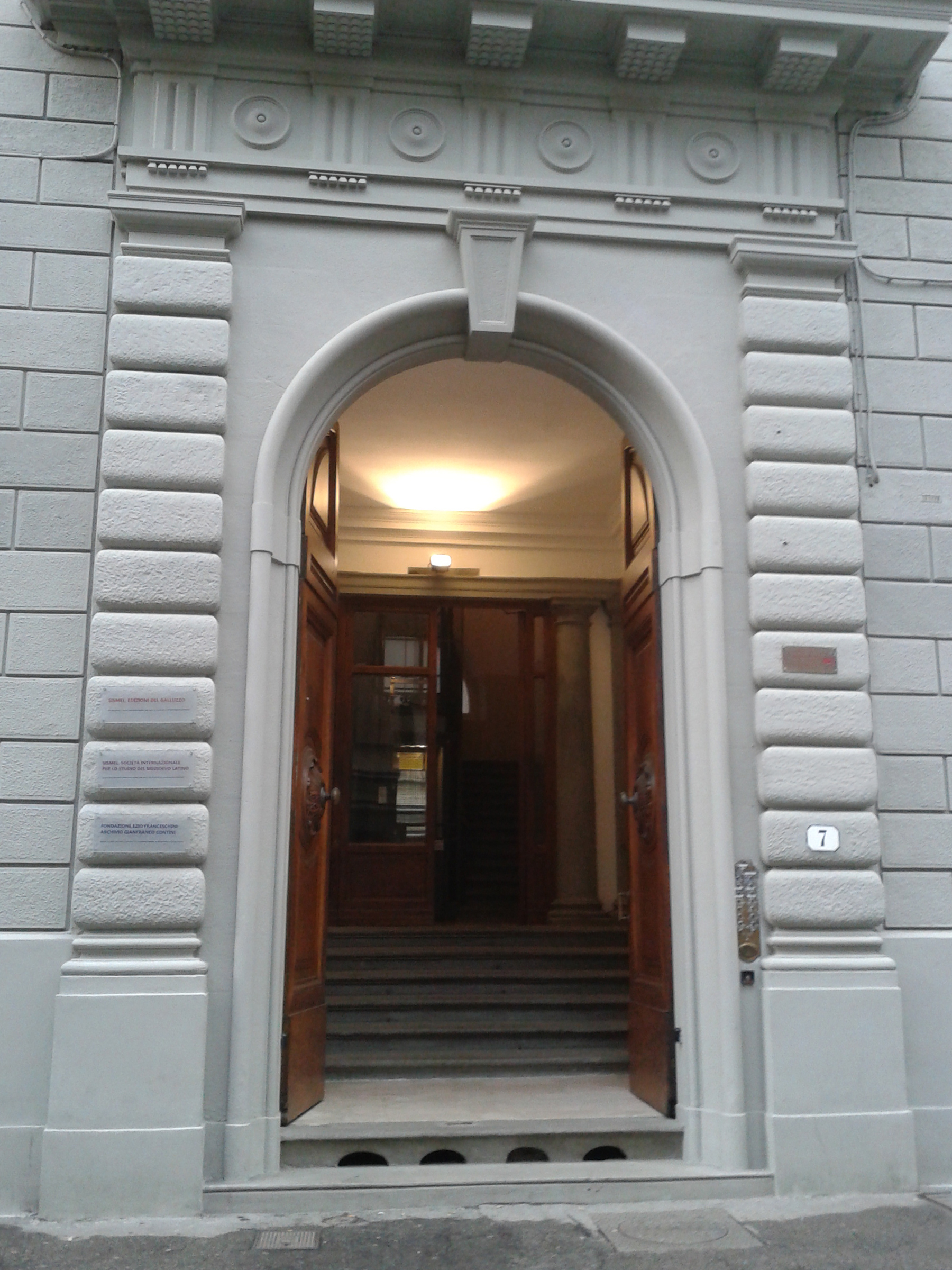
Florence, via Montebello 7, base of the Society

The International Society for the Study of Medieval Latin Culture (Italian: Società Internazionale per lo Studio del Medioevo Latino, known as SISMEL) is an Italian non-profit cultural institute, based in Florence. It promotes multi-disciplinary research into the history, art, literature and philology of the medieval Latin era.

== Structure ==
SISMEL was founded by Claudio Leonardi in 1978, formally recognized in 1984 and was approved as a Superior Graduate School by the Ministero per i Beni e le Attività Culturali in 1997.

In December 2012 SISMEL inaugurated the premises of the new headquarters, in a portion of a historic building, built in 1873 and located in the center of Florence in Via Montebello n. 7, between the Santa Maria Novella train station and the river Arno. All activities of SISMEL were transferred here in 2013 from the former Carthusian monastery of Certosa di Firenze, which was the first base of the Society.

In the same building of Via Montebello there is also the Ezio Franceschini Foundation, with which SISMEL has shared the premises of the Certosa for 25 years.

== Publishing ==
The Society runs the academic publishing house SISMEL-Edizioni del Galluzzo, specializing in editions of medieval literature and related subjects. It also publishes seven research periodicals:

- Documenti e studi sulla Tradizione filosofica medievale
- Filologia Mediolatina
- Hagiographica
- Iconographica
- Itineraria
- Micrologus
- Stilistica e Metrica Italiana

== Other projects ==
SISMEL is a partner in the project to digitalize the manuscripts of the Biblioteca Medicea Laurenziana in Florence, and in "MIRABILE", a knowledge management system for researching medieval culture.

== See also ==
- Agostino Paravicini Bagliani
- Fondazione Ezio Franceschini (FEF)
