= Re Cole =

Re Cole ([1964] 1 Ch 175, CA) also known as ex p. Trustee v Cole is a case in English property law dealing with the transfer of gifts.

== Facts ==
Mr Cole bought, furnished and equipped a large house in London as the family home, costing him £20,000 overall. Later that year, his wife came to London to move into their new home. He said to her 'look, it's all yours'. Subsequently, Mr Cole went bankrupt and the contents of the home were claimed. However, Mrs Cole claimed that they had been gifted to her.

== Judgment ==
The case establishes that a gift of chattels cannot be perfected by showing them to a donee and stating words of gift. In order to establish a gift there are three requirements. Namely, perfecting a gift requires 1) Intention 2) Delivery and 3) Acceptance. In this case Mr Cole had, by words, shown intention to make a gift to Mrs Cole. He had not however, delivered anything to her, and she had not accepted anything.

Therefore, in this case it was held that physical delivery (and some form of acceptance) is required by law to perfect a gift.
