= Francis of Assisi: The Life and Afterlife of a Medieval Saint =

2009 book by André Vauchez

- Author: André Vauchez
- Translator: Michael Cusato
- Language: English
- Publisher: Yale University Press
- Publication date: 2012
- Pages: xv, 398
- ISBN: 9780300178944
- OCLC: 759174485

Francis of Assisi: The Life and Afterlife of a Medieval Saint is a book by André Vauchez on Francis of Assisi. The book was first published in French in 2009, with its English translation by Michael Cusato published in the US in 2012 by Yale University Press. The book has been reviewed in several magazines and scholarly journals.

== Topics covered ==
Vauchez' Francis of Assisi contains four parts, as well as appendices.

== Reception ==
Reviews of Vauchez' Francis of Assisi have appeared in The Times Literary Supplement, by Robert Lerner; in The Catholic Historical Review; in Commonweal, by Lawrence S. Cunningham; in Speculum; and in the Australasian Catholic Record, by Daniel Anlezark.

In The Times Literary Supplement, Robert Lerner stated that Vauchez "writes lucidly and thoughtfully", and that for him, "Francis was neither a rebel nor a forerunner of modernity, but 'one of the great spiritual teachers of the human race'. Fittingly, the book culminates in a long essay on Francis’s spirituality meant to display the various ways in which the saint can be seen as a 'spiritual master like Jesus or Socrates'."

In The Catholic Historical Review, John V. Tolan stated that Vauchez' biography of Francis was "learned and very readable... creating a clear and cogent narrative based on the principal sources," and that the author "manages to present these complex traditions in a way that is both clear to novices and will seem fair to specialists — no small feat." He also stated that some "specialists... will be disappointed that Vauchez treads the well-worn paths of the “Franciscan question,” focusing on Franciscan hagiography and pontifical sources and paying little attention to much of the rich recent work in other areas of Franciscan history."

The book was also reviewed in Choice, Library Journal, and Booklist.

== Editions ==
The original French edition, in print, was published by Fayard in 2009. The first English language edition was published in 2012 by Yale University Press, in both print and electronic form:

- Vauchez, André (2012). Francis of Assisi: The Life and Afterlife of a Medieval Saint. Translated by Cusato, Michael F. (1st English print ed.). New Haven, Connecticut: Yale University Press. ISBN 9780300178944. OCLC 759174485
  - Vauchez, André (2012). Francis of Assisi: The Life and Afterlife of a Medieval Saint. Translated by Cusato, Michael F. (1st English electronic ed.). New Haven, Connecticut: Yale University Press. doi:10.12987/9780300184921. ISBN 9780300184921. OCLC 813932680
- Vauchez, André (2009). François d'Assise: entre histoire et mémoire (in French) (1st ed.). Paris: Fayard. ISBN 9782213618869. OCLC 318871515
