= Luce Pietri =

French historian (1931–2024)

- Born: 13 May 1931
- Died: 15 February 2024 (aged 92)
- Spouse: Charles Pietri

Academic background
- Education: École normale supérieure de jeunes filles

Academic work
- Discipline: Late antiquity
- Institutions: Paris-Sorbonne University
- Notable works: Histoire du christianisme des origines à nos jours; Prosopographie chrétienne du Bas-Empire

Luce Pietri (née Gascoin, 13 May 1931 – 15 February 2024) was a French historian and scholar of late antiquity.

== Education ==
Pietri attended the Lycée Thiers in Marseille (Khâgne 1950–51) and École normale supérieure de jeunes filles in 1952.

== Career ==
Pietri is known for her work on late antique history and early Christianity, especially the history of Gaul, and prosopography. She has also published editions of the hagiographies of Gregory of Tours.

In 1992–93 she was appointed a professor at the Paris-Sorbonne University. During the 1990s, she was the director of Centre Lenain de Tillemont at the Paris-Sorbonne University.

== Personal life and death ==
Married to the historian Charles Pietri, together they had three children.

Luce Pietri died on 15 February 2024, at the age of 92.

== Selected publications ==
- (1975) La topographie chrétienne des cités de la Gaule des origines à la fin du VIIe siècle. Paris: Publications du Centre de Recherches sur l'Antiquité tardive et le Haut Moyen Âge.
- (1983) La ville de Tours du IVe au VIe siècle. Naissance d'une cité chrétienne. Rome, Publications de l'École Française de Rome.
- (1984–85) ed. with Marc Venard. Le monde et son histoire, 2 vols. Paris: Robert Laffont.
- (1991–2001) ed. with Charles Pietri, André Vauchez, Marc Venard, and Jean-Marie Mayeur. Histoire du christianisme des origines à nos jours, 14 vols. Paris: Desclée.
- (2000) Prosopographie chrétienne du Bas-Empire: Prosopographie de l'Italie chrétienne (313-604). Rome: Publications de l'École Française de Rome.
- (2013) Prosopographie chrétienne du Bas-Empire: La Gaule chrétienne (314-614). Paris: ACHCByz. 2013.
- (2016) Grégoire de Tours. La Gloire des martyrs [text, translation and commentary]. Paris: Les Belles Lettres.
- (2016) Grégoire de Tours. La Vie des Pères [text, translation and commentary], Paris: Les Belles Lettres.
