= Charles Pietri =

French historian (1932–1991)

- Born: 18 April 1932; Marseille, France
- Died: 7 August 1991 (aged 59); Rome, Italy
- Occupations: Historian, professor

Charles Pietri (18 April 1932 – 7 August 1991) was a 20th-century French historian and university professor.

== Biography ==
A former pupil at the Lycée Thiers, Pietri entered the École normale supérieure in 1952 and obtained his agrégation d'histoire. He spent some times at the École française de Rome. In 1961, he was a research associate at the CNRS, and was an assistant at the Sorbonne from 1963 to 1966. He then became an assistant professor at the University of Lille, then a lecturer at Paris-Nanterre. He dedicated his doctoral thesis, published in 1976, to the study of Roma Christiana from 311 to 440. In 1975, he succeeded Henri-Irénée Marrou and held the chair of history of Christianity at the University Paris-Sorbonne. From 1983 to 1991 he was director of the École de Rome. On 17 November 1989, he was elected a corresponding member of the Académie des Inscriptions et Belles Lettres.

== Work ==
With his wife Luce Pietri, Jean-Marie Mayeur, André Vauchez and Marc Venard, Pietri initiated a monumental Histoire du christianisme des origines à nos jours, published from 1992 to 2001 at Éditions Desclée de Brouwer and meant to replace the Histoire de l’Église by Augustin Fliche. He also directed, with Luce Pietri, the second volume of the Prosopographie chrétienne du bas-empire on Italy (2000), an endeavour started by Jean-Rémy Palanque and Henri-Irénée Marrou. Contributors to the two-volume prosopography on Italy included Janine Desmulliez, Christine Friasse-Coué, Élisabeth Paoli-Lafaye, Charles Pietri, Luce Pietri, and Claire Sotinel.

Pietri authored other works and articles fundamental to the historic understanding of ancient Christianity:

- Le Monde latin antique et la Bible, with Jacques Fontaine, vol. II of the series "Bible de tous les temps", 1985
- Christiana respublica : éléments d'une enquête sur le christianisme antique, series of the École Française de Rome, 1997

== Honours ==
- Chevalier, Légion d'honneur
- Ordre des Palmes Académiques
- Officier, Ordre national des lettres
- Officier, Order of Merit of the Italian Republic
- Commander, Order of St Gregory the Great
- Member of the Pontifical Academy of Archaeology
