= Knapp v Knapp =

1945 South Australia court case

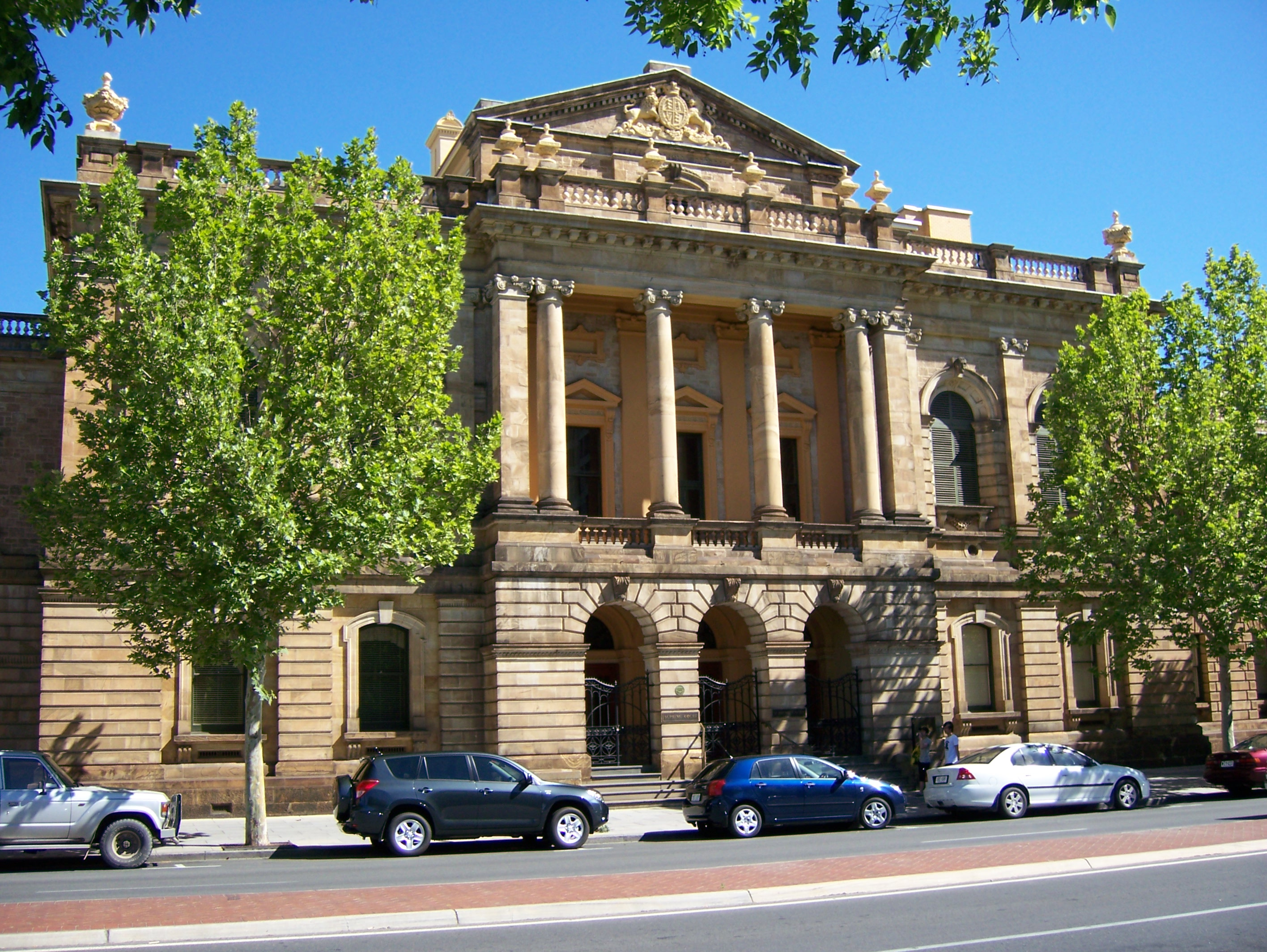
- Court: Supreme Court of SA
- Decided: 5 February 1945
- Citations: [1945] SAStRp 4, [1944] SASR 257

Case history
- Appealed from: Local Court, Adelaide

Court membership
- Judge sitting: Mayo J

Knapp v Knapp, is the possession by intention of donor case, decided in the Supreme Court of South Australia, Australia.

== History ==
The husband, the appellant, was the owner of a motor car. He said to his wife, the defendant, that he would give it to her as a birthday present. The car was registered in the husband's name, and subsequently re-registered in his name. The husband received a petrol allowance. The wife had custody of the car but used her husband’s petrol allowance. The wife made an action for the car and was successful. The husband appealed to the Supreme Court of South Australia. The case was heard by Mayo J.

== Decision ==
The Court, Mayo J, applied the four elements of gifting (from Handshin v Hackett, where no co-ownership is envisaged.

1. Intention by the donor to give an absolute right to exclusive enjoyment.

The car was registered in the husband's name, not the wife's, so he could get the petrol allowance. Therefore, he is the owner within the meaning of the Road Traffic Act. That which is lawful is preferred to that which is not. Additionally, the insurance was in his name, not her name.

2. The donee must accept the gift by overt conduct.

There is no evidence that the car was passed from the husband to the wife as a gift.

3. The donee acquires the gift in a timeframe that meets the donor's intentions.

The wife did not seem to have right of use in the timeframe under discussion, and so there was no delivery to her.

4. To be a gift there will be an absence of valuable consideration, which distinguishes it from sale or barter.

The husband is the owner of the motor car by purchase. He does not appear to have given it to his wife.

In conclusion, the judgment of the local court was set aside. The order was against the wife, and the husband recovered the car.
