= Odile Rudelle =

French historian (1936 – 2013)

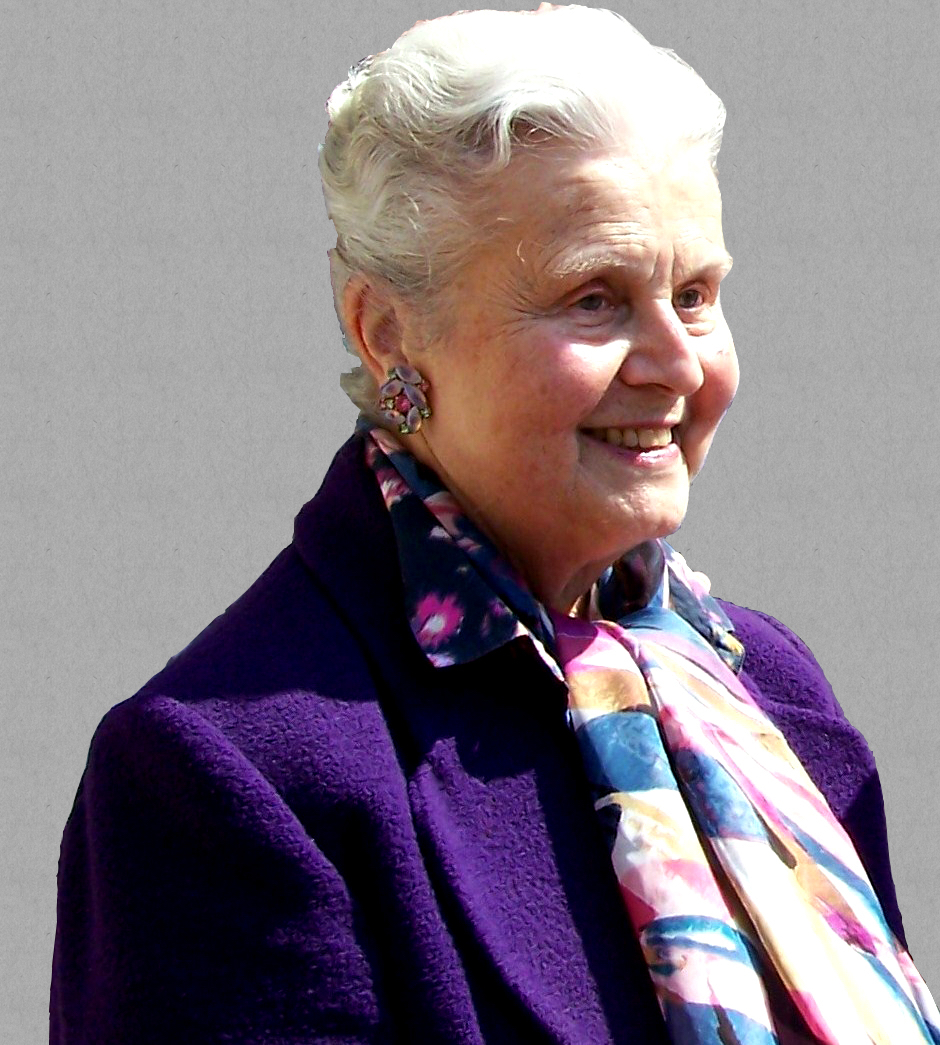
Odile Rudelle

Odile Rudelle (6 December 1936 – 2 August 2013) was a French historian and specialist in Gaullism from 1960 to 1982. In 1997, she was named Knight of the Legion of Honor and promoted to the Officer of the Legion of Honor in 2009.

== Biography ==
Born as Odile Geneviève Roux on 6 December 1936 in Mont-Saint-Martin, Meurthe-et-Moselle, north-eastern France, Odile Rudelle was the daughter of Roger Roux, chairman and CEO of the Société Métallurgique de Normandie, and his wife Yvonne Liotard-Vogt.

She graduated in history. From 1969, she worked as a scientific collaborator to Michel Debré, Minister of Foreign Affairs, and in 1973 she became his parliamentary assistant. In 1978, she obtained her doctorate in political science from the Institute of Political Studies by defending her thesis on to the origins of the constitutional instability of the French Republic under the supervision of François Goguel.

In 1992, she became a lecturer at the Institute of Political Studies. She was later appointed as the director of research at the Center for the Study of Contemporary French Political Life in 2007. She served as a member of the scientific council of the Charles de Gaulle Foundation. She was also a member of the board of directors of the French Association of Constitutional Law, chaired by Didier Maus.

She married Pierre-Marie Rudelle, a noted French painter.

She died on 2 August 2013 in Paris.

== Publications ==
Some of her publications include

- The Absolute Republic: the origins of the constitutional instability of republican France, 1870 – 1889
- May 58: de Gaulle and the Republic
- De Gaulle, for the record
- The Republican Model
- Jules Ferry: The Citizens' Republic
- Constitutional Normandy: a cradle of civil rights?
