= Donation (Catholic canon law) =

A donation, in the context of the canon law of the Roman Catholic Church, is the gratuitous transfer to another of some right or thing. When it consists in placing in the hands of the donee some movable object it is known as a gift of hand (donum manuale, an offering or oblatio, an alms). Properly speaking, however, it is a voluntary contract, verbal or written, by which the donor expressly agrees to give, without consideration, something to the donee, and the latter in an equally express manner accepts the gift. In Roman law and in some modern codes this contract carries with it only the obligation of transferring the ownership of the thing in question; actual ownership is obtained only by the real traditio or handing over of the thing itself, or by the observation of certain juridically prescribed formalities.

Such codes distinguish between conventional (or imperfect) and perfect donation, i.e. the actual transfer of the thing or right. In some countries the contract itself transfers ownership. A donation is called remunerative when inspired by a sentiment of gratitude for services rendered by the donee. Donations are also described as inter vivos if made while the donor yet lives, and causa mortis, when made in view or contemplation of death; the latter are valid only after the death of the donor and until then are at all times revocable. They much resemble testaments and codicils. They are, however, on the same footing as donations inter vivos once the donor has renounced his right to revoke. In the pursuit of its end the church needs material aid; it has the right therefore to acquire such aid by donation no less than by other means. In its quality of a perfect and independent society the Roman Catholic Church may also decide under what forms and on what conditions it will accept donations made to works of religion (donationes ad pias causas; English: donations toward pious causes); it pertains to the State to legislate for all other donations.

== History of ecclesiastical donations ==
Even before the Edict of Milan (313) the Church was free to acquire property by donation either as a juridically recognized association (collegium) or as a society de facto tolerated (note that the right to acquire property by last will and testament dates only from 321 in the reign of Constantine I). Nevertheless, the Church was held to observe the pertinent civil legislation, though on this head it enjoyed certain privileges; thus, even before the traditio, or handing over, of the donation to a church or a religious institution, the latter acquired real rights to the same. Moreover, the insinuatio or declaration of the gift before the public authority was required only for donations equivalent in value to 500 solidi (nearly twenty-six hundred dollars) or more, a privilege later on extended to all donations.

Finally, bishops, priests, and deacons yet under parental power were allowed to dispose freely, even in favour of the Church, of property acquired by them after ordination [L. 33 (34) C. De episcopis et clericis, I, 3]. The Franks, long quite unaccustomed to dispose of their property by will, were on the other hand generous in donations, especially cessiones post obitum, similar to the Roman law donations in view of death but carrying with them the renunciation on the donor's part of his right of revocation; other Frankish donations to the Church reserved the usufruct. The institution known as precaria ecclesiastica was quite favourable to the growth of donations. At the request of the donor the Church granted him the use of the donated object for five years, for his life, or even a use transferable to the heirs of the first occupant. Synods of this epoch assert to some extent the validity of pious donations even when the legal requisites had not been observed, though as a rule they were not omitted. Generally speaking, the consent of the civil authority (princeps) was not indispensable for the acquisition of property by religious corporations.

The restrictions known as the "right of amortization" are of later date, and are the outcome of theories elaborated in the Middle Ages but carried to their logical issue in the modern civil legislation (of Continental countries) concerning biens de mainmorte, or property held by inalienable tenure, i.e. the property of religious corporations, they being perpetual. The Church does not accept such legislation; nevertheless the faithful may act accordingly in order to secure to their donations the protection of the law.

== Canonical legislation ==
Donations are valid and obligatory when made by persons capable of disposing of their property and accepted by the administrators of ecclesiastical institutions. No other formality is required, neither notarial act nor authorization of the civil power. The declaration before the public authority, required by Roman law, is not obligatory in canon law. Nor are the faithful obliged to heed the restrictions which are placed by some modern civil codes in the way of a free disposition of their property. On the other hand, the donation must be accepted by the donee; it is not true, as some have maintained, that every donation for works of religion (ad pias causas) implies a vow, i.e. an act in itself obligatory independently of the acceptance of the donee. If the administrators of an ecclesiastical institution refuse to accept a donation, that institution can always obtain in canon law a restitutio in integrum, whereby it is again put in a condition to accept the refused donation.

The canonical motives for the revocation or diminution of a donation are the birth of children to the donor and the donatio inofficiosa, or excessive generosity on the latter's part, whereby he diminishes the share of inheritance that legitimately belongs to his children. In both cases, however, the donation is valid in Canon law to the degree in which it respects the legitimate share of the donor's children. It is worthy of note that while ecclesiastical and religious establishments may give alms, they are bound in the matter of genuine donations by the provisions of the canon law concerning the alienation of ecclesiastical property.

== Civil legislation (by 1910) ==
In most European countries by 1910 the civil authority restricted in three ways the right of the Roman Catholic Church to accept donations:

- by imposing the forms and conditions that the civil codes prescribe for donations;
- by reserving to itself the right of saying what institutions shall have civil personality and be thereby authorized to acquire property;
- by exacting the approval of the civil authority, at least for important donations.

Austria recognized a juridical personality not only in those religious institutions which are charged with the maintenance of public worship, but also, through easily granted approval, in religious associations of any kind. The so-called amortization laws (against the traditional inalienability of tenure on the part of religious corporations) remained only a threat, though the Government reserved the right to establish such legislation. Religious communities, however, were required to make known to the civil authorities all their acquisitions of property.

In Germany, even since the promulgation of the Civil Code of the Empire (1896), the legislation varied from State to State. In all, however, property rights were recognized by the law in only those ecclesiastical institutions that are recognized by the State. As a rule, donations had to be authorized by the civil power if they exceed the value of five thousand marks (1250 dollars, or 250 pounds sterling) though in some states this figure was doubled. In Prussia civil authorization was requisite for all acquisition of real property by a diocese, a chapter, or any ecclesiastical institution.

In Italy every donation had to be approved by the civil authority, and only the institutions recognized by the State are allowed to acquire property; note, however, that simple benefices and religious orders could not acquire this latter privilege. With few exceptions, ecclesiastical institutions in Italy were not allowed to invest in any other form of property than Government bonds.

In France the associations cultuelles, or worship-associations, were recognized by the State as civil entities for the conduct of public worship; it is well known, however, that Pope Pius X forbade the Catholics of France to form such associations. That country recognized the civil personality of licit associations organized for a non-lucrative purpose, but declared illicit every religious congregation not approved by a special law. At the same time, it refused to approve the religious congregations which have sought this approval.

== See also ==
- Gift (law)
