= Philippe Minard =

French academic researcher and historian (1961–2024)

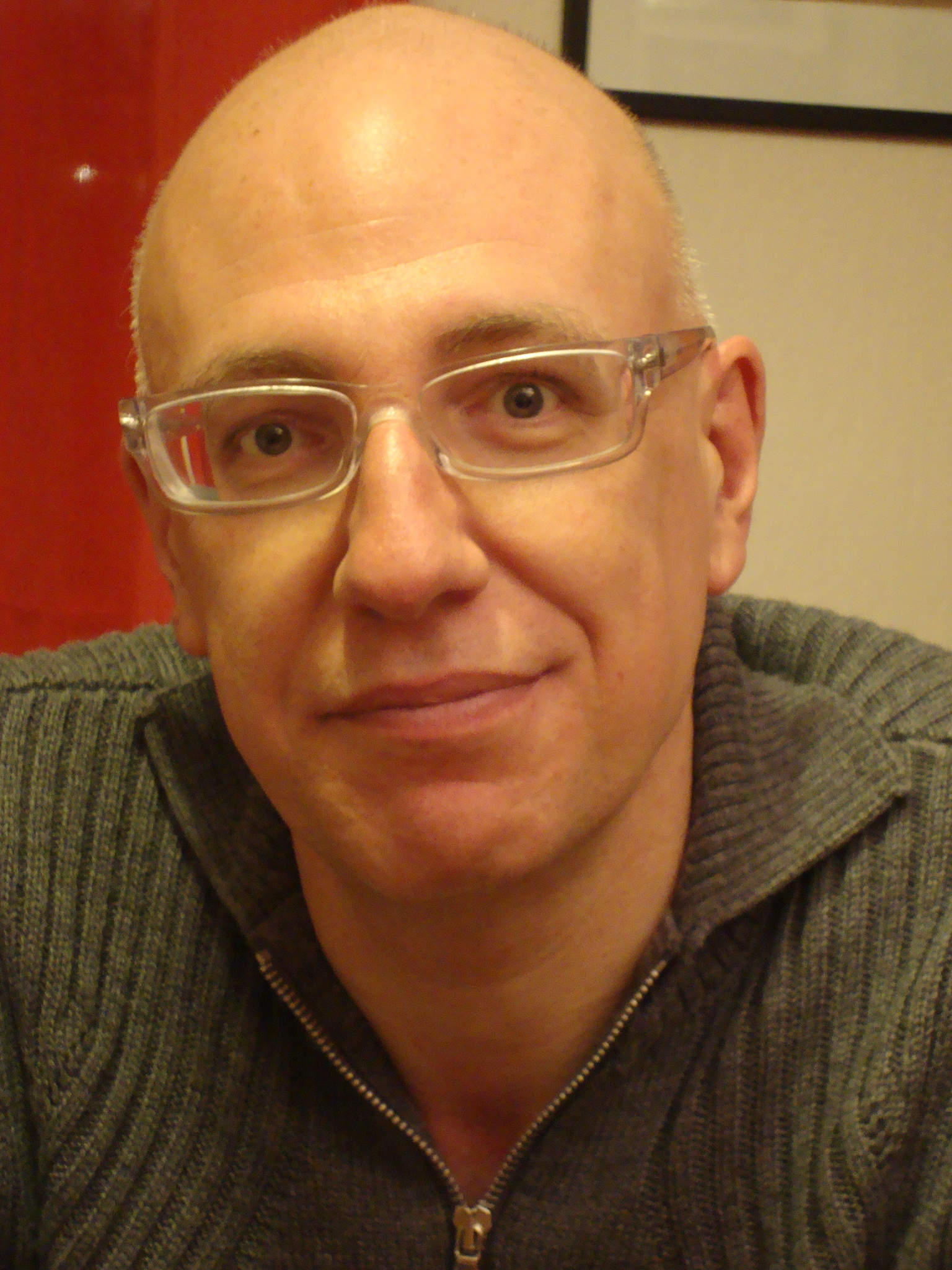
- Minard in 2009
- Born: 18 October 1961; Pont-Audemer, France
- Died: 24 March 2024 (aged 62)
- Education: École normale supérieure de Fontenay-aux-Roses; Panthéon-Sorbonne University
- Occupations: Researcher; Historian

Philippe Minard (18 October 1961 – 24 March 2024) was a French academic researcher and historian.

Minard was a longtime professor and chair of the modern history department at Paris 8 University Vincennes-Saint-Denis and director of studies at the School for Advanced Studies in the Social Sciences. He specialized in the economic and social history of France and England during the 18th Century.

== Biography ==
Born in Pont-Audemer on 18 October 1961, Minard graduated from the École normale supérieure de Fontenay-aux-Roses in 1986. He earned a doctorate from Panthéon-Sorbonne University in 1994 with a thesis titled L'inspection des manufactures en France, de Colbert à la Révolution and directed by Daniel Roche. He was a docent at the University of Lille from 1995 to 2005.

Minard obtained a habilitation à diriger des recherches from Panthéon-Sorbonne University in 2004. In 2005, he became a professor at Paris 8 University Vincennes-Saint-Denis and became director of studies at the School for Advanced Studies in the Social Sciences in 2007. That year, he signed his name in an appeal in Le Nouvel Observateur urging people to vote for Ségolène Royal in the presidential election.

Philippe Minard died on 24 March 2024, at the age of 62.

== Publications ==
- Typographes des Lumières : suivi des Anecdotes typographiques de Nicolas Contat (1989)
- La fortune du colbertisme : état et industrie dans la France des Lumières (1998)
- France moderne par les sources : 1498-1653 (1999)
- France moderne par les sources : 1653-1789 (1999)
