= Gabrielle Houbre =

French historian

Gabrielle Houbre is a French historian. She is a lecturer at the University of Paris VII: Denis Diderot and a member of the Institut Universitaire de France. Specializing in 19th century history, she pursues research of gender, history of sexuality, the body, sensitivities, and youth.

After her doctoral thesis was completed under the direction of Michelle Perrot (Paris VII, 1990), she supported her accreditation in 2002 to carry out research (Les lois du genre. Identités, pratiques, représentations sociales et culturelles. France, XIXe siècle, Paris I-Sorbonne, dir. Alain Corbin).

== Works ==
- La Discipline de l'amour. L'éducation sentimentale des filles et des garçons à l'âge du romantisme, Plon, 1997
- Histoire de la grandeur et de la décadence de Marie Isabelle, modiste, dresseuse de chevaux, femme d'affaires, etc., Perrin, 2003
- Le Temps des jeunes filles (direction), n° 4, Clio. Femmes, genre, histoire, PUM, 1996
- Femmes et images (codirection), n° 19, CLIO, Histoire, Femmes et Sociétés, PUM, 2004
- Le Corps des jeunes filles, de l'Antiquité à nos jours, Perrin, 2001
- Femmes, dots et patrimoines, n° 7, CLIO, Histoire, Femmes et Sociétés, PUM, 1998
