= Jean-Pierre Verdet =

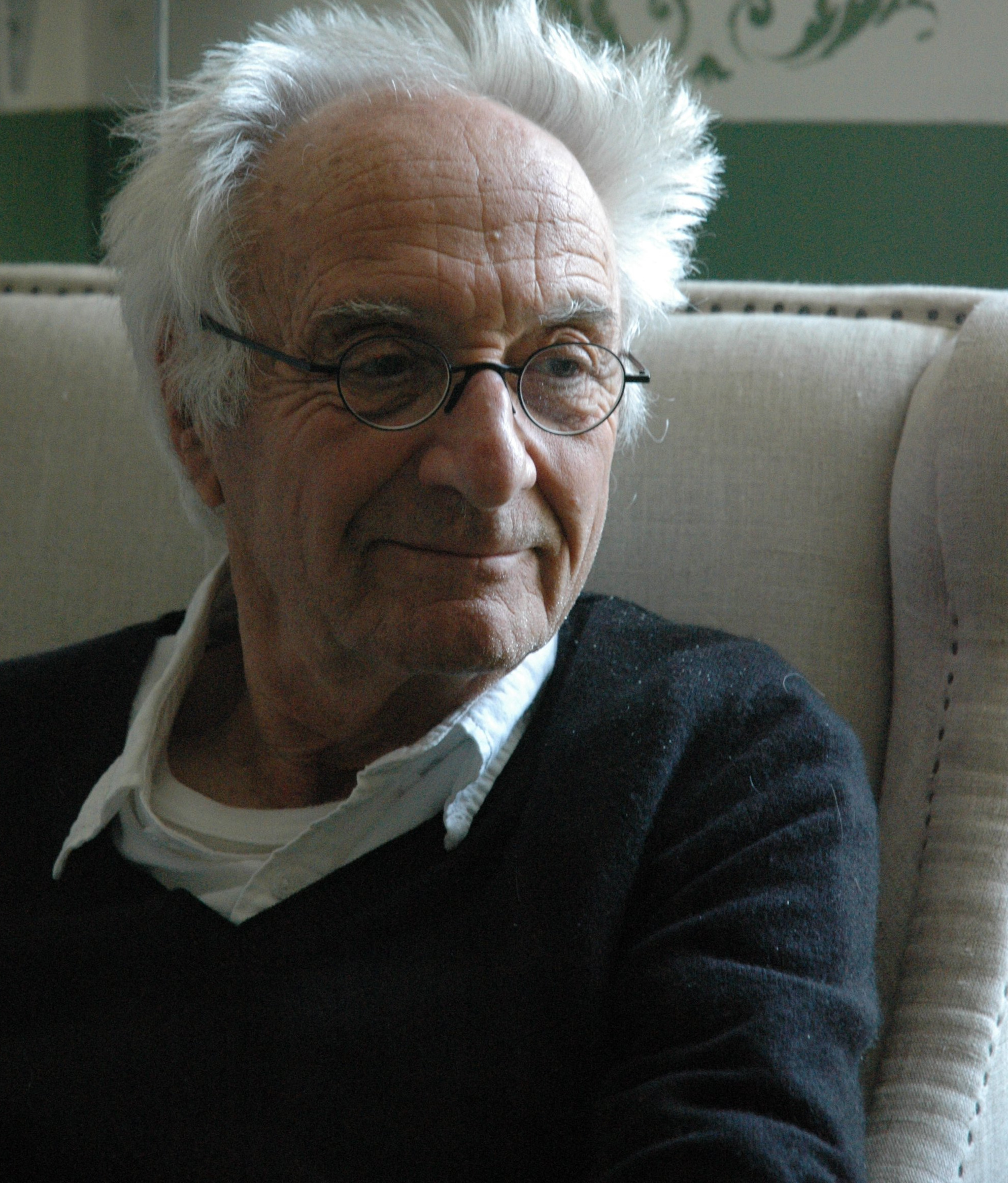
- Verdet in 2012
- Born: 1932 (age 93–94); Paris, France
- Occupations: Astronomer, historian of astronomy, mathematician

Jean-Pierre Verdet (born 1932) is a French astronomer, historian of astronomy and mathematician.

== Biography ==
Jean-Pierre Verdet is a Bachelor of Mathematics. Doctor of Science at Paris Diderot University (1975). In 1963, he entered the Paris Observatory, where, after studying the solar corona, he inaugurated infrared astronomy in France, then studied the radiation of the planets in this wavelength domain. He later became head of the Department of spherical astronomy at Paris Observatory. He has regularly taught the MAS of celestial mechanics at the Observatory, a higher education institution which is authorized to issue doctorates.

He left the Observatory in 1976, he devoted half of his activity to the history of ancient astronomy with the multidisciplinary team he had assembled at the Observatory, to translate Latin, Greek and Arabic astronomical texts. In the field of history of astronomy, in addition to scholarly works, he has authored many books for general public, especially for youth. He was a member of Pierre Marchand’s team that helped to create Gallimard Jeunesse. He wrote Le ciel, ordre et désordre (1987), a heavily illustrated pocket book for Gallimard’s encyclopaedic collection "Découvertes", which has been translated into fourteen languages, including English. He has published more than 30 books at Gallimard.

In 1991, he collaborated in the astronomical organisation Nuits des étoiles, with Daniel Kunth and Hubert Reeves on a TV show at France 2. The show lasted 4 hours.

In 2016, the Budget Prize of Académie des Inscriptions et Belles-Lettres was awarded to Michel-Pierre Lerner, Alain-Philippe Segonds and Jean-Pierre Verdet for their 3-volume critical works of Nicolaus Copernicus’ De revolutionibus orbium coelestium.

For this same publication, which is the first critical work of De revolutionibus orbium coelestium translated into French with commentaries, the Alexandre Koyré Medal 2015 of the International Academy of the History of Science was awarded to this team work.

== Selected bibliography ==
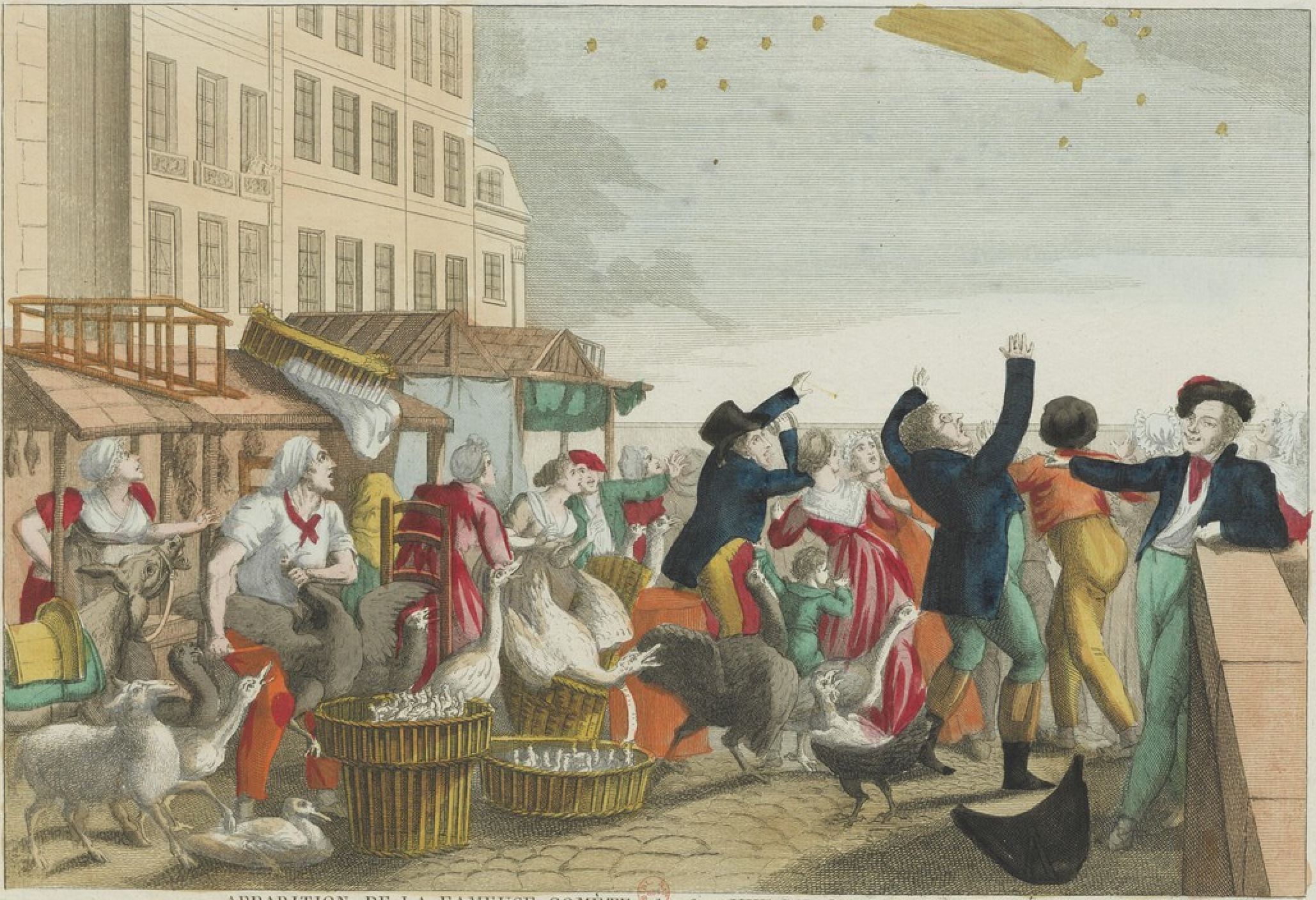
Appearance of the famous comet of 1811, featured on the cover of Le ciel, ordre et désordre.

- The Air Around Us, Moonlight Publishing, 1986
- Le ciel, ordre et désordre, collection « Découvertes Gallimard » (nº 26), série Sciences et techniques. Éditions Gallimard, 1987, new edition in 2001
  - UK edition – The Sky: Order and Chaos, ‘New Horizons’ series. Thames & Hudson, 1992
  - US edition – The Sky: Mystery, Magic, and Myth, "Abrams Discoveries" series. Harry N. Abrams, 1992
- The Earth and Sky, Scholastic, 1992
- Earth, Sky and Beyond: A Journey Through Space, Dutton Juvenile, 1995
- Penser l’univers, collection « Découvertes Gallimard Texto » (nº 2). Éditions Gallimard, 1998

Collective work

- Nicolaus Copernicus, translated by J-P Verdet and others, De revolutionibus orbium coelestium / Des révolutions des orbes célestes, Les Belles Lettres, 2015
