= Pierre-Marie Rudelle =

French painter

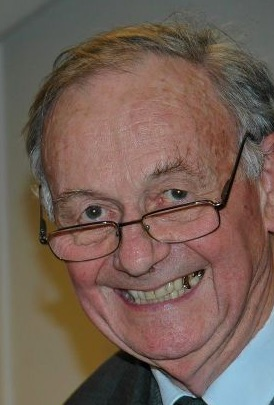
Pierre-Marie Rudelle in 2009

Pierre-Marie Rudelle (18 June 1932, Paris – 28 December 2015, Paris) was a French artist painter who specialized in trompe-l'œil which is an art technique that uses realistic imagery to create the optical illusion that the depicted objects exist in three dimensions. He was commissioned by Jacqueline Kennedy to paint a pair of doors in her dressing room in the White House. He died in Paris on 28 December 2015 at the age of 83 years.

Born in Paris on 18 June 1932, Pierre Marie Rudelle entered the Académie Julian at the end of his secondary education. Admitted to the Ecole des Beaux-Arts in 1950, he then left it to enter the Ecole Camondo, which depends on the Central Union of Decorative Arts, from which he graduated in 1953.

In 1955, he started as a decorator at Jansen, rue Royale in Paris, which he left to work in Athens.

Back in Paris after two years spent in Greece, he devoted himself to trompe-l'oeil, easel painting, mural painting and frescoes.

In 1963, he received the bronze medal of the city of Paris. Numerous commissions in Europe, United States, Japan, etc.. He executed murals for ships such as the liner France or the royal yacht of Saudi Arabia, the city of Amboise. Decorations for the Fouquet's in Paris and Mexico, the restaurant on the Eiffel Tower, the Eden-Roc Hotel in Antibes, the swimming pool of the Bristol Hotel in Paris, the Brenner's Park Hotel in Baden-Baden, etc.

Since 1964, personal exhibitions in Paris at Béatrice Carré and at the Galerie d'art de la Place Beauvau, and in Berlin, Deauville, Nancy, Amboise.

In 1965, he was co-author (with Jacques Marillier) of the sets for the Palais Royal theater for the play GIGI by Colette

He also participated in group exhibitions: Salon des Artistes Français, Salon de la peinture à l'eau.

He is quoted in a book published in 1993: "Le trompe l'œil contemporain" by Martin Monestier, Editions Menges.

In 1975 Henri Cadiou visited his studio and invited him to join his group to exhibit at the Salon "Comparaisons" from 1976.

He died in Paris on 28 December 2015 at the age of 83.

Many decors made all over the world: For the White House in Washington (currently at the Kennedy Foundation in Boston). For the Duchess of Windsor, Pamela Churchill, the Shah of Iran, etc. Many works in private collections.
