= André Vauchez =

French medievalist

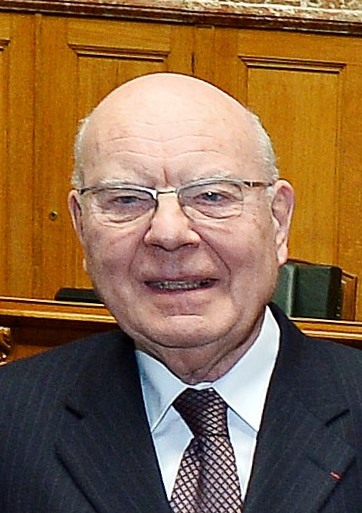
André Vauchez, in 2013.

André Vauchez FBA (born 24 July 1938, Thionville) is a French medievalist specialising in the history of Christian spirituality. He has studied at the École normale supérieure and the École française de Rome. His thesis, defended in 1978, was published in English as Sainthood in the Later Middle Ages in 1987 and has become a standard reference work.

Vauchez served as the director of medieval studies at the École française de Rome (1972–1979), master of studies at the French National Centre for Scientific Research, and professor of medieval history at the University of Rouen (1980–1982) and at the University of Paris X Nanterre (1983–1995). He was awarded the Balzan Prize for Medieval History in 2013. Vauchez was elected as a Corresponding Fellow of the British Academy in 2015.

== Bibliography ==
=== Books ===
As author

- La spiritualité du Moyen Âge occidental VIII^{e}–XIII^{e} (The spirituality of the medieval West), Paris, Presses universitaires de France, 1975.
- La sainteté en Occident aux derniers siècles du Moyen Âge (1198-1431), Rome, École française de Rome, 1981 [English trans.: Sainthood in the Later Middle Ages, Cambridge, 1987 and Italian trans.: La santità nel Medioevo, Bologne, 1989].
- Les laïcs au Moyen Âge (The Laity in the Middle Ages), Paris, Cerf, 1987.
- Saints, prophètes et visionnaires : le pouvoir du surnaturel au Moyen Âge (Saints, prophets and visionaries: the power of the supernatural in the Middle Ages), Paris, Albin Michel, 1999.
- François d'Assise, Paris, Fayard, 2009 (Prix Chateaubriand 2010)
- Les hérétiques au Moyen Âge : suppôts de Satan ou chrétiens dissidents, Paris, CNRS, 2014.
- Francis of Assisi: The Life and Afterlife of a Medieval Saint, Yale University Press, 2012. Translator Michael F. Cusato.

As editor

- Histoire du christianisme, Paris, Desclée, t. IV, V et VI, 1990–1993.
- Dictionnaire encyclopédique du Moyen Âge, Paris, Cerf, 2 vol., 1997–1998.
- Christianisme : dictionnaire des temps, des lieux et des figures, Paris, Le Seuil, 2010.
- Rome au Moyen Âge, Riveneuve éditions, 2010.

=== Critical studies and reviews ===
- Acocella, Joan (14 January 2013). "Rich man, poor man : the radical visions of St. Francis". The Critics. Books. The New Yorker. Vol. 88, no. 43. pp. 72–77.
