= Marc Venard =

French historian (1929–2014)

- Born: 11 July 1929; Versailles
- Died: 11 November 2014 (aged 85); Rouen
- Occupation: Historian

Marc Venard (11 July 1929 – 11 November 2014) was a French historian.

A student at the École Normale Supérieure, he was agrégé and doctor in history and a specialist of religious history of the 16th century. He was emeritus professor of modern history at the Universities of Rouen and Paris West University Nanterre La Défense and member of the Académie des sciences, belles-lettres et arts de Rouen.

== Publications ==
- 1957: Bourgeois et paysans au XVIIe siècle. Recherche sur le rôle des bourgeois parisiens dans la vie agricole au sud de Paris au XVIIe siècle, Paris, SEVPEN
- 1967: Le Monde et son histoire, tomes V et VI, Paris, Bordas-Laffont
- 1977–1985: Répertoire des Visites pastorales de la France. Première série : anciens diocèses (jusqu’en 1790), Paris, éd. du CNRS, 4 vol. (in collaboration with D. Julia). Corrections and Compléments, Paris, SHRF, 2006
- 1993: Réforme protestante, Réforme catholique dans la province d’Avignon, XVIe, Paris, Éditions du Cerf
- 1998: La religion dans la France moderne (with Anne Bonzon), Paris, Hachette
- Direction et rédaction partielle de l’Histoire du Christianisme, Paris, Desclée :
  - 1994: volume 7, De la réforme à la Réformation (1450–1530)
  - 1992: volume 8, Le temps des Confessions (1530–1620/40)
  - 1997: volume 9, L’Âge de raison (1620/40–1750), ISBN 2718906340
- 2000: Le Catholicisme à l’épreuve dans la France du XVIe, Paris, éd. du Cerf (collection of articles) ISBN 220406307X (prix Gossier of the Académie des sciences, belles-lettres et arts de Rouen)
- 2010: Les Confréries dans la ville de Rouen à l’époque moderne, XVIe-XVIIIe siècles, Rouen, Société de l’histoire de Normandie,ISBN 2853510158
- Contributions to the Dictionnaire d’histoire et de géographie ecclésiastiques (article "France, XVIe" and some others); to the Histoire générale de l’enseignement et de l’éducation en France, Paris, Nouvelle Librairie de France, volume 2, 1981; reprint 2003; and to the Histoire de la France religieuse, Paris, éd. du Seuil, volume 2, 1988; to The Oxford Encyclopedia of the Reformation, New York et Oxford, 1996 (art. "Assembly of Clergy" and "France")
- Au miroir de Clio-28.09.2014, with Marc Venard (une histoire de la Réforme catholique) : https://www.youtube.com/watch?v=NJMYH7yavkQ
