= On the Road to Timbuktu: Explorers in Africa =

1999 documentary film by Jean-Claude Lubtchansky

- French: Vers Tombouctou : L'Afrique des explorateurs
- Genre: Documentary
- Based on: Vers Tombouctou : L'Afrique des explorateurs II by Anne Hugon
- Written by: Anne Hugon
- Screenplay by: Jean-Claude and Carole Lubtchansky
- Story by: Anne Hugon
- Directed by: Jean-Claude Lubtchansky
- Voices of: François Marthouret; Yves Lambrecht; Richard Sammel
- Country of origin: France
- Original language: French

Production
- Producer: Jean-Pierre Gibrat
- Running time: 52 minutes
- Production companies: Trans Europe Film; La Sept-Arte; Éditions Gallimard

Original release
- Network: Arte
- Release: 6 November 1999

On the Road to Timbuktu: Explorers in Africa (French: Vers Tombouctou : L'Afrique des explorateurs; German: Auf nach Timbuktu!) is a 1999 documentary film adapted from French historian Anne Hugon's nonfiction book of the same name. The film was directed by Jean-Claude Lubtchansky and co-produced by Trans Europe Film, La Sept-Arte and Éditions Gallimard, with voice-over narration by French actors François Marthouret and Yves Lambrecht, and German actor Richard Sammel. It follows in the footsteps of Mungo Park, René Caillié and Heinrich Barth, three explorers who have become renowned in both Europe and Africa.

The documentary was broadcast on Arte on 6 November 1999, as part of the channel's television programme The Human Adventure. It has been dubbed into German; it is unclear whether the film is available in English.

== Synopsis ==
In the early 19th century, inner Africa was still a terra incognita for Europeans. But the scientific and geographical curiosity of the previous century's Enlightenment movement brought forth a new type of adventurer: the explorer, whose purpose was to inform contemporaries about the diversity of cultures and civilisations in the world. Among them, Mungo Park, René Caillié and Heinrich Barth became well known in Europe for their expeditions and discoveries in inner and western Africa.

== Introduction ==
After Once Upon a Time in Mesopotamia, Quand le Japon s'ouvrit au monde and Galilée, le messager des étoiles, this is Lubtchansky's fourth documentary film adapted from literary works in the "Découvertes Gallimard" collection. A permanent connection between the past and the present, history, memory and reality. Combining illustrations (maps, engravings, paintings), archive photos and scenes filmed on location, "it's a work on the fringe of the real and the imaginary", explains the filmmaker, a method inspired by the pictorial richness of "Découvertes" books.

== The book ==
Vers Tombouctou : L'Afrique des explorateurs II
- First edition. The cover features a portrait of Lat Jor, reverse painting on glass, Senegal. In the background, view of Timbuktu, in Notes de Voyages à Tombouctou by René Caillié. Bibl. nat., Paris.
- Author: Anne Hugon
- Language: French
- Series: Découvertes Gallimard●Invention du monde
- Release number: 2nd in series, 216th in collection
- Subject: European exploration of Timbuktu and West Africa
- Genre: Nonfiction monograph
- Publisher: Éditions Gallimard
- Publication date: 14 September 1994
- Publication place: France
- Media type: Print (paperback)
- Pages: 176 pp.
- ISBN: 978-2-0705-3226-1 (first edition)
- OCLC: 463950114
- Preceded by: L'Homme avant l'Homme : Le scénario des origines
- Followed by: Périclès : L'apogée d'Athènes

=== Introduction ===
The book Vers Tombouctou : L'Afrique des explorateurs II, on which the film is based, is an illustrated monograph on the history of the European exploration of Timbuktu, inner and western Africa, published in pocket format by Éditions Gallimard on 14 September 1994. Written by the French Africanist and historian Anne Hugon, this work is the 216th volume in the encyclopaedic collection "Découvertes Gallimard", and part of the collection's Histoire series (formerly belonging to Invention du monde series). It's also a sequel of The Exploration of Africa: From Cairo to the Cape ("Découvertes" No. 117). Together, they form a "miniseries"—L'Afrique des explorateurs—in the collection.

The book follows the tradition of "Découvertes", which is based on an abundant pictorial documentation and a way of bringing together visual documents and texts, enhanced by printing on coated paper; in other words, "genuine monographs, published like art books".

While many of the French titles from the collection have been published in English, this book has never been translated.

=== Synopsis ===
The book concentrates on Timbuktu, an ancient city in Mali, in West Africa, a region not covered by the preceding work From Cairo to the Cape.

For Europeans, Timbuktu was a mythical city in the heart of the Sahara. In 1795, Mungo Park reached the Niger River. Thirty years later, René Caillié entered this "forbidden city", while Hugh Clapperton explored Lake Chad and Heinrich Barth crossed the Sahara. Travellers discovered the powerful dynasties of West Africa. From 1850, the new explorers were mostly colonial officers on missions of conquest. On the eve of World War I, despite African nationalism, Europeans had created genuine empires in Africa.

== See also ==
- Mali Empire
- Scramble for Africa
- Colonisation of Africa
