= Jacquin =

Jacquin is a surname. Notable people with the surname include:

- Abel Jacquin (1893–1968), French film actor
- Alfonso Jacquin (1953–1985), Colombian guerilla fighter
- Érick Jacquin (born 1964), French-Brazilian chef
- François Xavier Joseph Jacquin (1756–1826), Flemish painter
- Joseph Franz von Jacquin (1766–1839), Austrian scientist, son of Nikolaus
- Lisa Ann Jacquin (born 1962), American equestrian
- Nikolaus Joseph von Jacquin (1727–1817), scientist, particularly in botany
- Philippe Jacquin (1942–2002), French anthropologist
