= Découvertes Gallimard =

Collection of illustrated, pocket-sized books on a variety of subjects

- Four titles from the collection, first row from left to right — Les feux de la Terre : Histoires de volcans, L'Afrique des explorateurs : Vers les sources du Nil, Tous les jardins du monde and Figures de l'héraldique; and their English editions published in the corresponding American and British series — Abrams Discoveries (second row) and New Horizons (third row), respectively.
- Edited by: Pierre Marchand, Élisabeth de Farcy, Paule du Bouchet
- Translator: Ruth Sharman, Paul G. Bahn, et al.
- Illustrator: Dominique Thibault, Jean-Olivier Héron, for pré-générique only (first 2 volumes), et al.
- Cover artist: David Roberts, Roland Cat, et al.
- Country: France
- Language: French; some titles originally published in Dutch, English, German and Italian
- Genre: Encyclopaedia, humanities
- Publisher: FR: Éditions Gallimard; UK: Thames & Hudson; US: Harry N. Abrams
- Published: 1986–present
- Published in English: UK & US: 1992–2008
- Media type: Print (paperback) & e-book for iPad
- No. of books: 700+ (including spin-offs); 107 (UK edition); 111 (US edition) (List of books)
- OCLC: 638040265
- Website: www.decouvertes-gallimard.com

Découvertes Gallimard (French: [dekuvɛʁt ɡalimaːʁ], lit. 'Gallimard Discoveries'; in United Kingdom: New Horizons, in United States: Abrams Discoveries) is an editorial collection of illustrated monographic books published by the Éditions Gallimard in pocket format. The books are concise introductions to particular subjects, written by experts and intended for a general audience.

Created in the style of livre d'art, the collection is based on an abundant pictorial documentation and a way of bringing together visual documents and texts, enhanced by printing on coated paper, as commented in L'Express, "genuine monographs, published like art books". Its creator—Pierre Marchand the "iconophile", as remarked by the German graphic designer Raymond Stoffel—was instrumental in moulding the policy and ideals of the collection, which was an immediate success both in France and internationally.

The first title À la recherche de l'Égypte oubliée (English edition: The Search for Ancient Egypt) appeared on 21 November 1986, authored by the French Egyptologist Jean Vercoutter. These scholarly little books then released in successive volumes, without a systematic plan, each of which is structured like a separate book (see monographic series). 588 titles were published by November 2012, with more than 160 volumes of spin-offs and catalogues as of 2021.

== Overview ==
The Sky: Order and Chaos

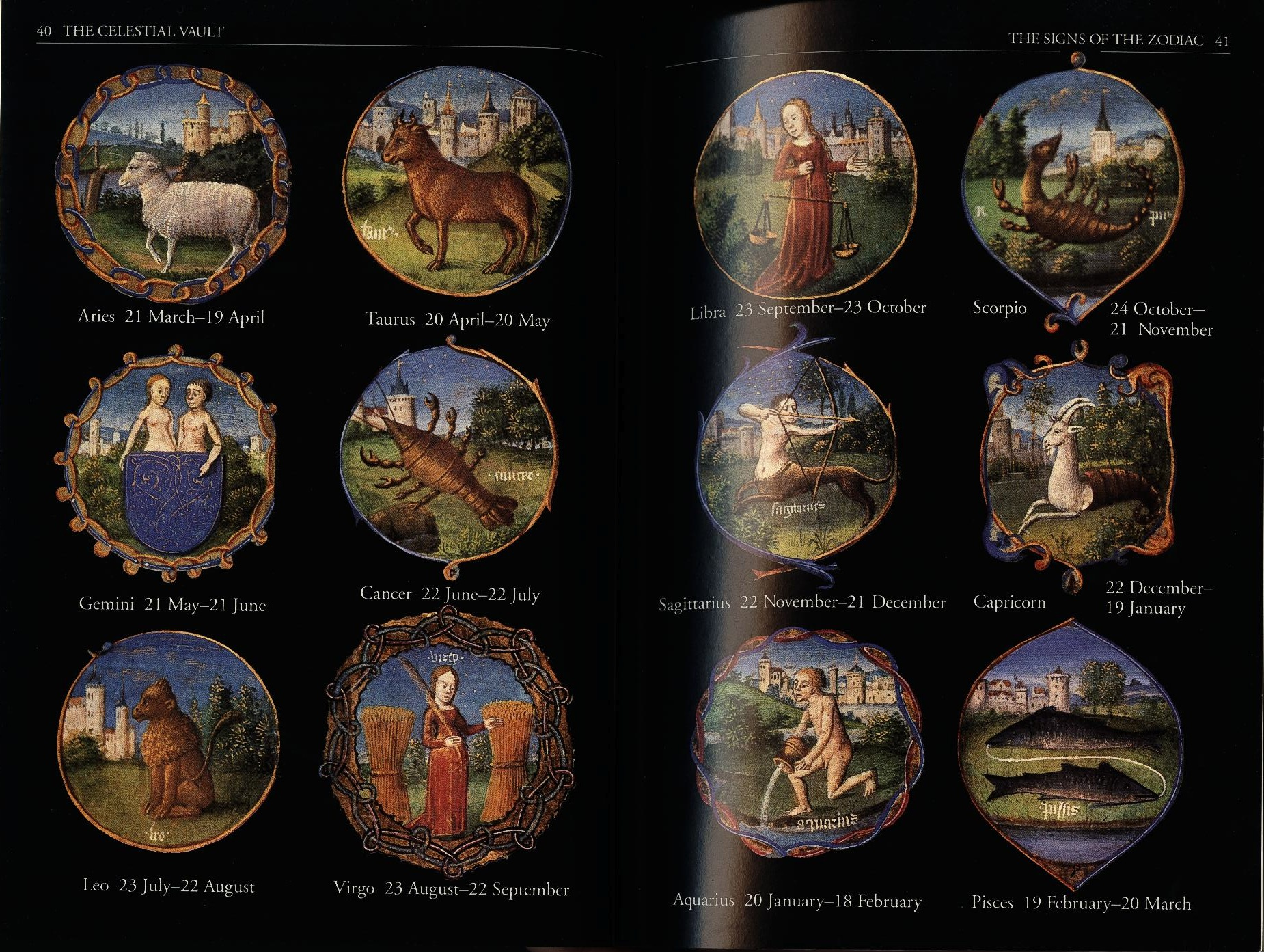
pp. 40–41: the signs of the zodiac, miniatures from a book of hours.

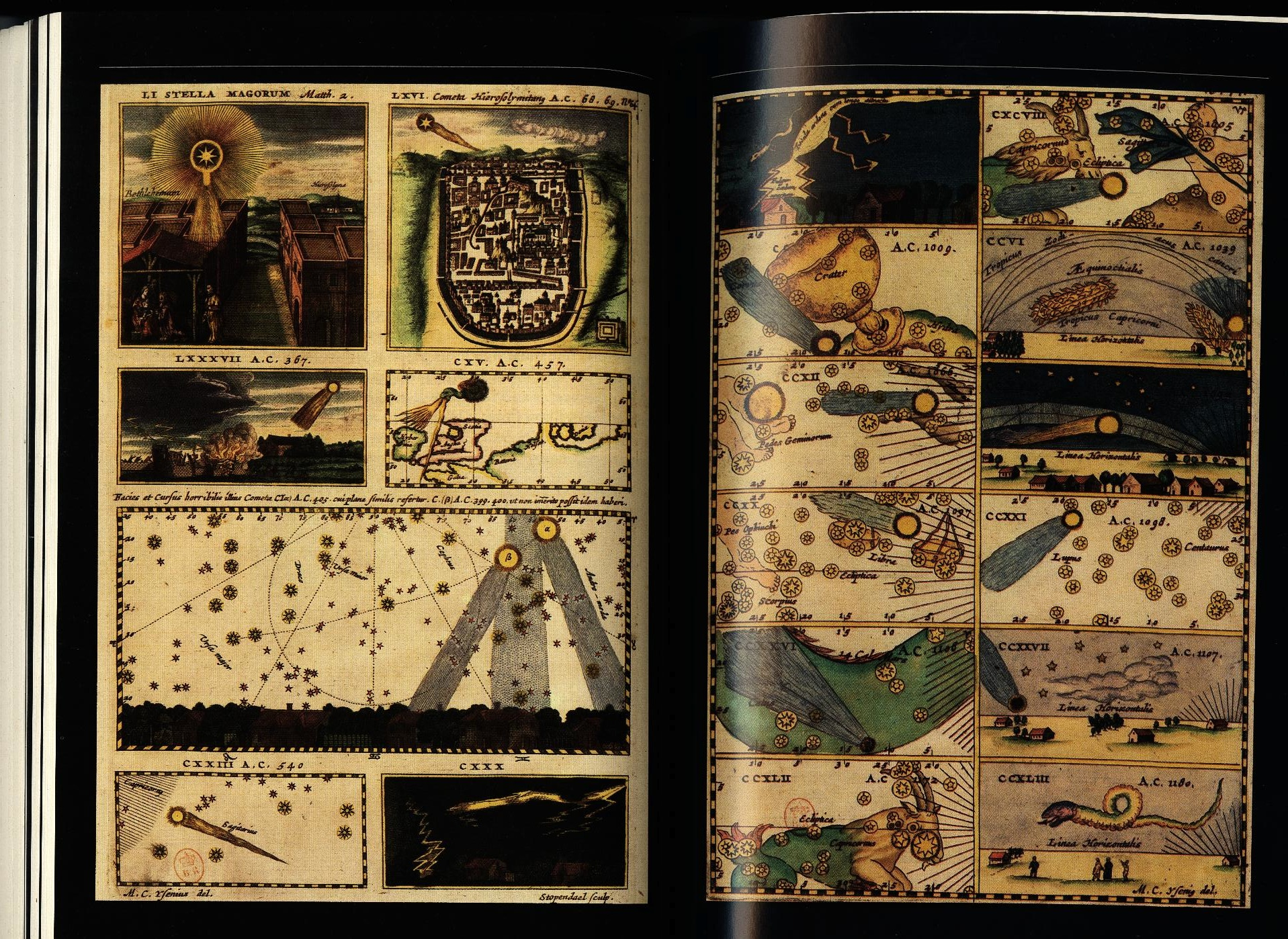
pp. 80–81: all types of comets (cometography), illustrations from Theatrum Cometicum by Stanisław Lubieniecki.

The first pocket-sized encyclopaedia illustrated in colour.
(La première encyclopédie illustrée en couleurs au format de poche.)

The books are printed using A6 format (125 × 178 mm), according to Encyclopædia Universalis, "with breathtaking iconography (illustration)" reproduced on thick and glossy coated paper, from which leap two or three images per page. In this picture-dense format, the authors must squeeze their words in edgewise. Each book is composed of a monograph on a particular topic, the whole collection covers all areas of human knowledge and experience, such as archaeology, art, culture, civilisation, history, music, religion, science, et cetera, with 502 specialists' contributions. Chronological narrative is the principal structure for describing a subject, for example, the 26^{th} title Le ciel, ordre et désordre (UK ed. The Sky: Order and Chaos), which narrated in chronological order to present the varied subjects relating to the sky above and peoples' perception of it, through historical perspective of cultural, social and religious aspects.

The captions for illustrations must be informative, they should not duplicate information in the body text, nor do they interrupt the narrative thread. Researchers and academics must adhere to the constraints of a mainstream collection. Apart from obvious analytical abilities, authors are expected to write quality text and a sensitivity to illustration. A "Découvertes" is not a book of authorship, the author is only one of the many speakers. Bruno Blasselle, director of the Bibliothèque de l'Arsenal, author of two volumes of Histoire du livre ('History of Book', № 321 and № 363), and co-author of the 88^{th} title La Bibliothèque nationale de France : Mémoire de l'avenir, explained his experience of working for the collection: "For an author, to write a Découvertes title is to be trapped, to put oneself in a situation of being obliged to go beyond his/her own formulation."

Book spines

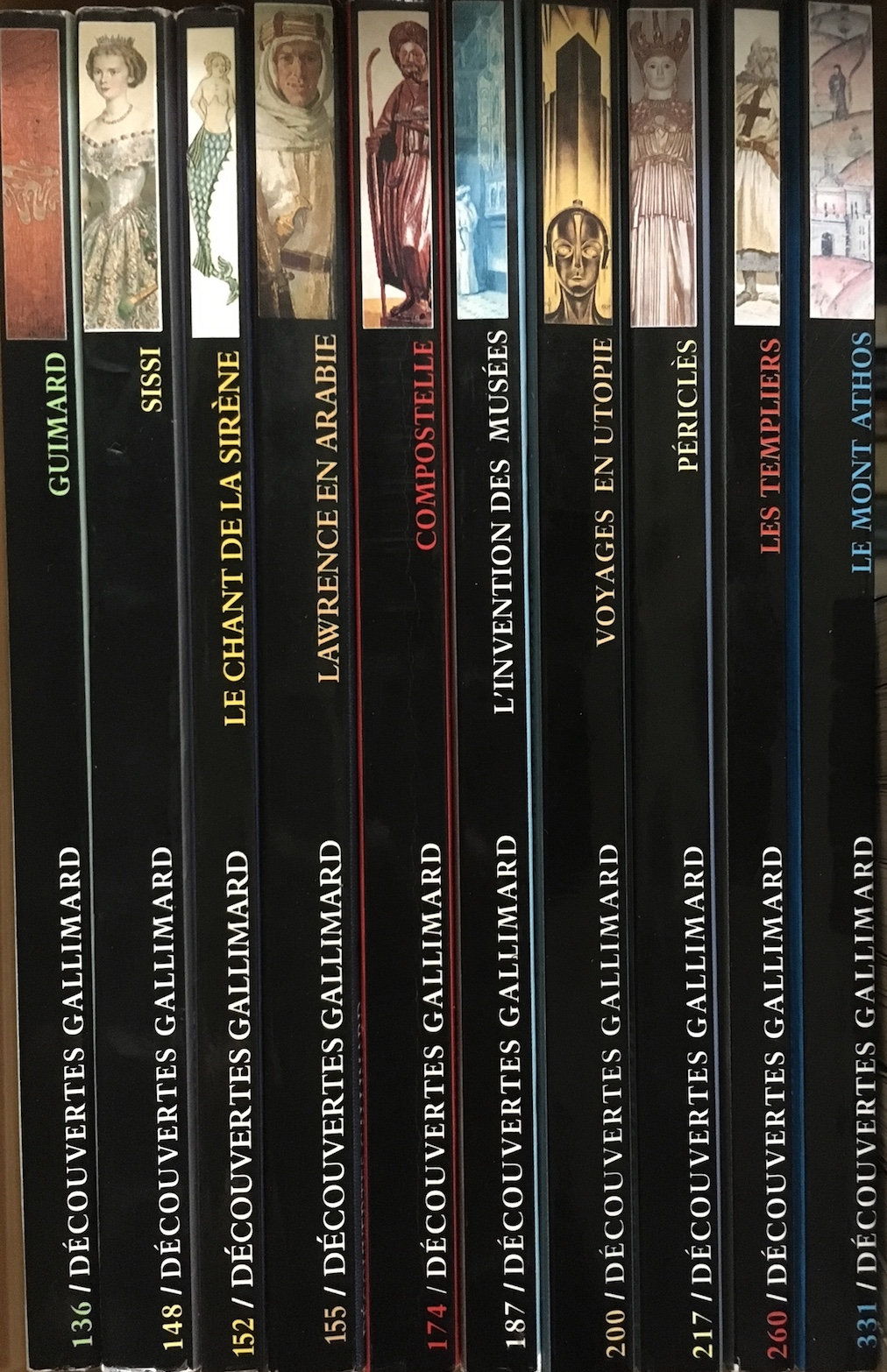
"Découvertes Gallimard", the original edition.

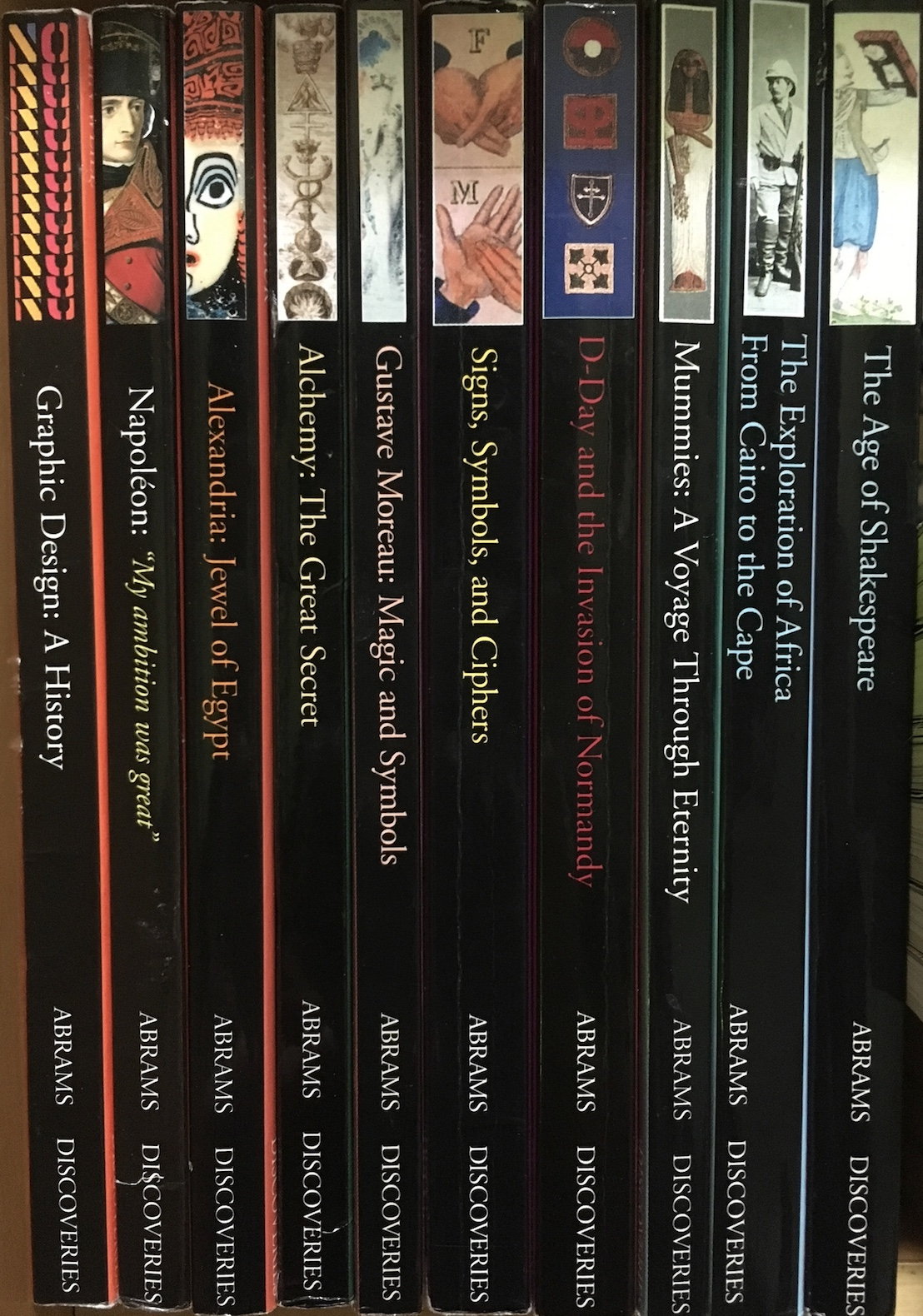
"Abrams Discoveries", the U.S. edition.

International editions of the first title À la recherche de l'Égypte oubliée. From left to right, first row: American, British, German and Taiwanese editions; second row: Hispanic American, Russian, Romanian and Japanese editions. Editions in the first row sharing identical cover artwork with Gallimard, whereas those in the second row being redesigned.

The cover design is one of the specificities. The old covers are glossy with black background illustrated in colour, the newer covers are matt-laminated rather than glossy, but more colourful, with different colour codes according to the subject matter. It differs from other reference books by its visual: a full-size picture, with its framing and the power of figurative elements, also a picture well-matched to the inside page layout, with a tiny, relevant picture illustrating the spine. The visual identity is consistent, allowing readers to recognise the collection's international editions. However, there are some exceptions, for instance, the Barcelonese publisher Ediciones B adopted a completely different cover design for their collection Biblioteca de bolsillo CLAVES.

The "trailers"

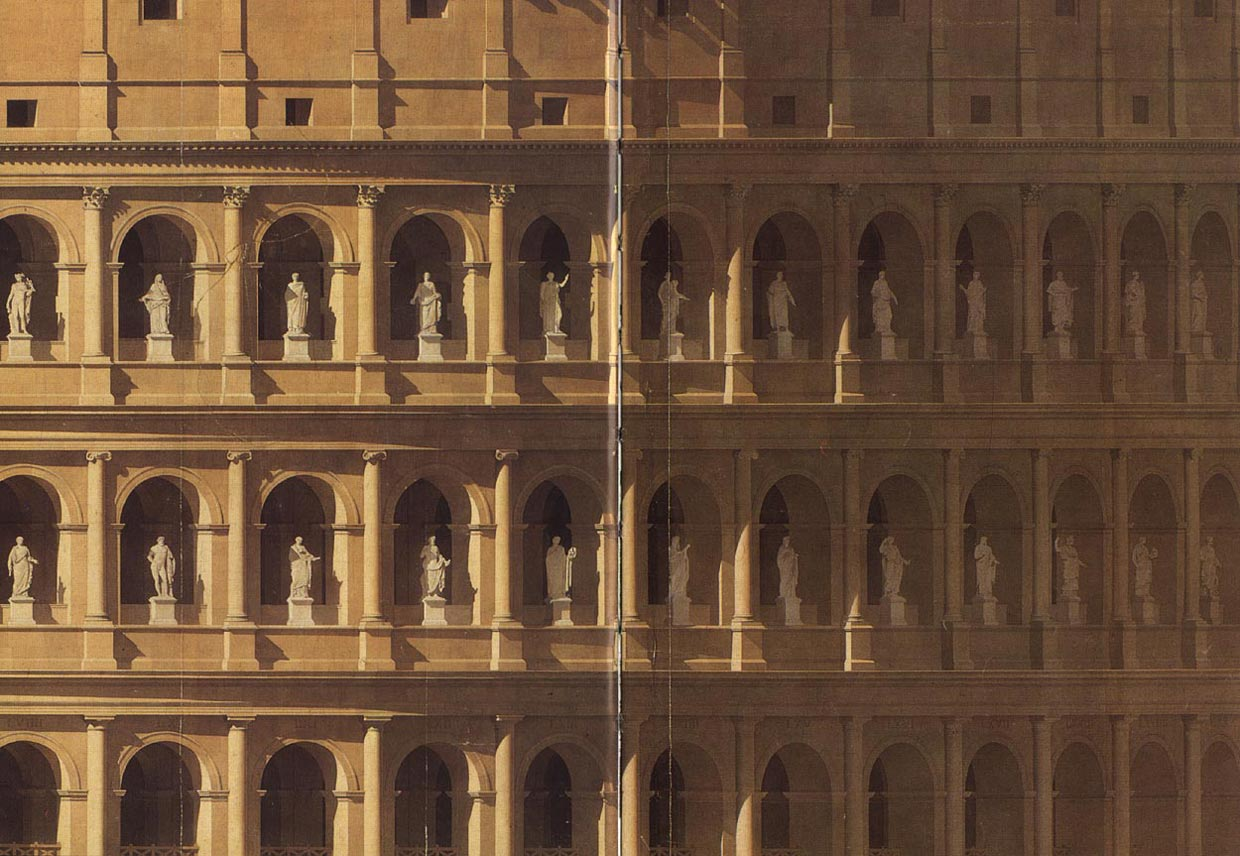
"Trailer" (pp. 2–3) for Claude Moatti's The Search for Ancient Rome. Painting by Louis Duc, 1830.

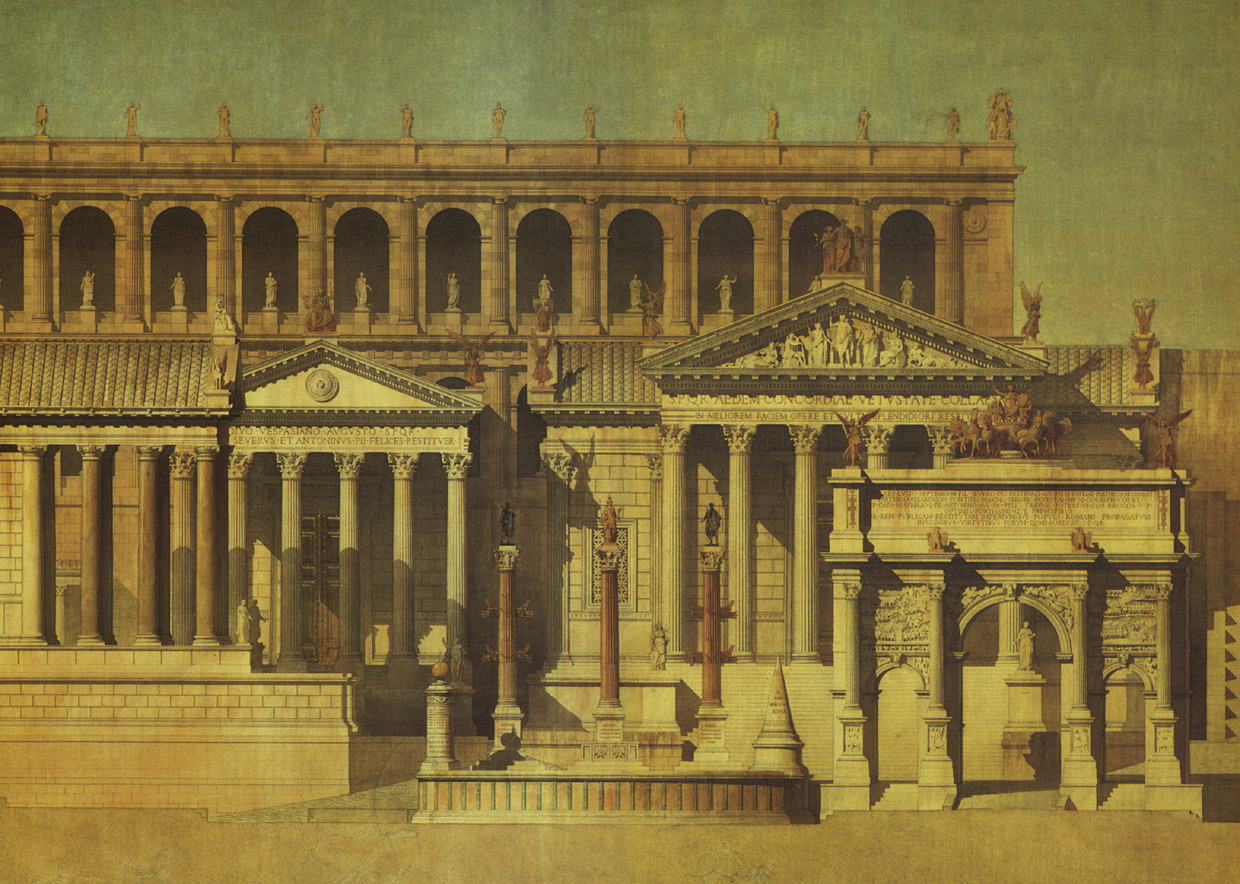
"Trailer" (pp. 6–7) for Claude Moatti's The Search for Ancient Rome. Painting by Constant Moyaux, 1866.

Each title contains 128–224 pages with approximately 120–220 illustrations printed in four, five, six, or seven colours, both matte and glitter, and sometimes even gold, as in the 39^{th} title Richard Wagner : L'opéra de la fin du monde, the metallic gold heightens Carl Otto Czeschka's illustrations from Die Nibelungen. Each book begins with 8–10 full-page illustrations or photographs, prefaced by a pull-quote on the inside front cove, which Thames & Hudson director Jamie Camplin calls it a "cinema-influenced trailer" (designated as pré-générique in French). For the 96^{th} title Champollion : Un scribe pour l'Égypte, this book opens with a succession of reproductions of Champollion's manuscript Grammaire égyptienne; in L'Europe des Celtes (№ 158), the reader is greeted by a series of bronze masks and hoary faces carved in stone; the "trailer" for La Saga de l'espace (№ 3) evokes the tragic launch of the Space Shuttle Challenger in 1986; while that of La Tour de Monsieur Eiffel (№ 62) presents the Eiffel Tower at every stage of its construction.

The dynamic in page layout between text and illustration. Inside page view of Jerome Charyn's New York : Chronique d'une ville sauvage ('New York: Chronicle of a Wild City'), the 204^{th} title of the collection.

The novelty lies in the subtle orchestration of the text and the illustration, where successive sequences, inserts and foldouts overlapping in double pages. According to the subject, the body text (designated as corpus in French) is structured into three to eight chapters, consisting of 64 (in the case of the 333^{rd} title Enquête sur Sherlock Holmes) to 128 pages (most of the titles). Each chapter is built using journalistic methods, with a lead paragraph and intertitle. The corpus is punctuated by double-page spreads of images, known as inserts, sort of a halt for pictures. For the 124^{th} title La peur du loup ('Fear of Wolves'), two double-page spreads of reproductions of Gustave Doré's engravings to illustrate Little Red Riding Hood. These books benefit a lot from journalistic and cinematographic techniques, some titles include panoramic foldouts, kind of projection on big screen. Two foldouts in the 16^{th} title Pompéi, la cité ensevelie, (Note: English edition title (both American and British) – Pompeii: The Day a City Died.) one showing Léon Jaussely's reconstruction of the forum of Pompeii, the other representing the actual condition of the theatre quarter in 1859 by using Paul-Émile Bonnet's drawings, both in a panoramic view. In the 369^{th} title Le papier : Une aventure au quotidien ('The Paper: A Daily Adventure'), through a partnership with paper companies, there are even three luxurious foldouts that all made on different papers from Arjo Wiggins, presenting one of the 17^{th} century watercolours on the traditional manufacture of Chinese paper; the other of the engravings and drawings by Albrecht Dürer and Leonardo da Vinci; the third depicts today's paper production line with its different machines.

Unlike the corpus in colour, the second part—the "Documents" section (Témoignages et Documents)—is always printed in black and white. It works as an anthology, providing more specialised texts from relevant authors, excerpts, historical records, among others. It contains files made jointly by the author or the publisher, with lead paragraph to link texts and short captions for each file. According to the subject, an annex concludes "Documents" section with a chronology, a filmography, a discography or a bibliography, with a "List of Illustrations" (Table des illustrations) giving full details of the sources of illustrations, an alphabetical index, as well as photo credits, dedicated to those who want to go deeper into the subject.

The collection also stands out for its attention to detail. On the choice of typeface, for example, Trump Mediaeval for body text, ITC Franklin Gothic for titling, Zapf Dingbats for guillemets, italic for captions with an initial and the last line is underlined, et cetera. The French editions are printed by Kapp Lahure Jombart in Évreux, while the Italian printer Gianni Stavro, who has largely contributed to the elaboration of new techniques used in the collection, retains his position as collaborator for international reissues and coeditions. The bindings are solid, sewn and not glued. As Gallimard's promise to their readers, "the most beautiful pocket collection in the world" (« la plus belle collection de poche du monde »).

The collection formerly consisted of eighteen series—Archéologie, Architecture, Art de vivre, Cinéma, Histoire, Histoires naturelles, Invention du monde, Littérature, Mémoire des lieux, Musique et danse, Peinture, Philosophie, Religions, Sciences, Sculpture, Sports et jeux, Techniques and Traditions—which have been abandoned, it is now reorganised around seven major subjects with colour codes: Arts (red), Archéologie (brown), Histoire (blue), Littératures (white), Religions (dark blue), Culture et société (yellow) and Sciences et techniques (green).

== History ==
Logo of Découvertes Gallimard, appearing on the back cover and book spine, including "Hors série" and some international editions.

Découvertes Gallimard was born in Gallimard Jeunesse, based on an idea by Pierre Marchand after the publications of two pocket collections: Découvertes Cadet in 1983 and Découvertes Benjamin in 1984. These three Découvertes collections cater to three levels: grades 4 to 6 (Découvertes Benjamin), grades 7 to 9 (Découvertes Cadet), and grades 10 and up (Découvertes Gallimard). This pocket encyclopaedia initially named Les Chemins de la connaissance ('The Paths of Knowledge'), Pierre Marchand already had the idea when he entered Gallimard in 1972, as he explained: "I have invested fourteen years of my professional life in this collection. Thanks to the success of 'choose your own adventure books' that we were able to embark on this adventure. [...] For the first time, genuine encyclopaedias in pocket format. [...] Our bet is that once you open the book, no matter what subject you read or which page you are on, you can no longer close it." Françoise Balibar, Jean-Pierre Maury, Jean-Pierre Verdet, Marc Meunier-Thouret and some others were the first to experience this pharaonic project that would await the arrival of Élisabeth de Farcy and Paule du Bouchet, in 1981, for truly to take shape. To producing genuine encyclopaedias in pocket format and fully illustrated in colour, in that time, many judged such an editorial project insane. In November 1986, however, the collection was released at Gallimard and directed by Élisabeth de Farcy. She chose authors and organised iconographic campaigns, several editors and iconographers were then gathered, copious "iconographies" (illustrations) were extracted from heritage resources. Élisabeth explained in an interview with La Croix: "The image should occupy a central place, as in a work of art." The authors were sceptical about this project at first, even contemptuous, but they have eventually been fascinated by the collection. Some have even authored several books, such as Françoise Cachin, curator of the Musée d'Orsay, author of three books – Gauguin : « Ce malgré moi de sauvage » (Note: English edition title (both American and British) – Gauguin: The Quest for Paradise.) (№ 49), Seurat : Le rêve de l'art-science (№ 108), Manet : « J'ai fait ce que j'ai vu » (Note: American edition – Manet: The Influence of the Modern; British edition – Manet: Painter of Modern Life.) (№ 203); the physicist Jean-Pierre Maury, who wrote four titles – Galilée, le messager des étoiles (№ 10), Comment la terre devint ronde (№ 52), Newton et la mécanique céleste (Note: American edition – Newton: The Father of Modern Astronomy; British edition – Newton: Understanding the Cosmos.) (№ 91) and Le palais de la Découverte (№ 195); or the historian of religion Odon Vallet, who published seven books in the collection.

A preview edition, or "zero edition" (numéro zéro) was sent to 500 booksellers during the summer of 1986. The collection was officially released on 21 November of the same year. The first twelve titles, twenty-five thousand copies of each volume were printed. "We've never seen so many things between the first and last pages of a book" is the slogan proposed by Pascal Manry's advertising agency CLM BBDO for the launch of the collection. Without market research at the start, Pierre Marchand, a self-taught man, explained on the television programme Ça se discute: "This project was as old as my thirst for knowledge. No doubt it is necessary to be precisely self-taught to sense the importance of an encyclopaedia. We must have been forced to build our own culture, to seek reliable references, to make clear statements. To conceive 'Découvertes', I didn't need market research, surveys or tests. Right from the start, I wanted to give the public the books I needed." Although "Découvertes" was reserved for youth at the beginning, it was eventually launched for the general adult public. The collection then had a rapid-growth, 105 titles appeared in five years. The first international collaboration was started with the Madrid-based Spanish publisher Aguilar in 1989, and 19 countries would finally be associated with the project. In 1992, after 151 titles have been published, Gallimard showed interest in the work on mermaid and Siren (De lokroep van de zeemeermin) by Vic de Donder, a Belgian Dutch-language writer. Nevertheless, the Parisian publishing house hesitated, "interesting subject, but how can you illustrate that?" Then De Donder showed a list of about one thousand images that he gathered over years, Gallimard was convinced and made him the first non-French-language author published in the collection.

In the heyday of "Découvertes" at the turn of the 1990s, authors were mainly recruited from academics and curators. Numerous artist monographs were often published on the occasions of major exhibitions, with a predilection for painters and musicians. Such as the 165^{th} title Matisse : « Une splendeur inouïe » (Note: British edition title – Matisse: The Sensuality of Colour; American edition title – Matisse: The Wonder of Color.) was released for the exhibition "Henri Matisse 1904–1917" at the Centre Georges Pompidou in 1993; and Geneviève Haroche-Bouzinac's Élisabeth Vigée Le Brun (from "Hors série") was on sale at the exhibit of Vigée Le Brun's paintings in New York City at the Metropolitan Museum of Art. Or reactivity in relation to current events, for instance, the 161^{st} title Sang pour sang, le réveil des vampires was published on 5 January 1993 for the release of Francis Coppola's Dracula in France; and La mine dévoreuse d'hommes (№ 184) for the release of the French film Germinal; Un Conservatoire pour les Arts et Métiers (№ 222) for the bicentennial of the CNAM; La Mode : Un demi-siècle conquérant (№ 511) was on sale on the occasion of "Yves Saint Laurent retrospective" at the Petit Palais in 2010. Some works were launched within a limited time frame, such as Mémoires du Louvre (№ 60), for the inauguration of the Louvre Pyramid in 1989; and Les Temples de l'opéra (№ 77) for the Opéra Bastille in 1990, both completed in six to eight weeks instead of the usual two or three months. Alongside many works dictated by current events, there are also a number of "strange curiosities", such as a book devoted to red hair (№ 338 – Roux et rousses : Un éclat très particulier), which is unusual in this type of collection. Some subjects can be more difficult to sell but considered necessary, such as the perspective (№ 138 – La Perspective en jeu : Les dessous de l'image), images of human body (№ 185 – Les images du corps (Note: British version title – The Human Body: Image and Emotion; American version title – Images of the Body.)) and mannerism (№ 457 – Le maniérisme : Une avant-garde au XVI^{e} siècle). But in recent years, there were more monographs on memoirs of places and large institutions instead of artists, as well as various sociological and religious aspects, for instance, a book on the history of New York City by Jerome Charyn, which is translated and adapted from his English work Metropolis: New York as Myth, Marketplace, and Magical Land (№ 204 – New York : Chronique d'une ville sauvage); titles on agrifood (№ 406 – « Dis-moi ce que tu manges... »), on homosexuality (№ 417 – La longue marche des gays), or on drugs (№ 423 – Les drogues : Une passion maudite); titles about Marian devotions and apparition (№ 401 – La Vierge : Femme au visage divin & № 524 – Le monde de Lourdes), about Christian saints and Sufism (№ 458 – Les Saints : Des êtres de chair et de ciel & № 554 – Le soufisme : Voie mystique de l'islam). And also numerous volumes devoted to writers, for example, the 381^{st} title Proust : La cathédrale du temps.

Difficult subjects were frequently in demand, possibly because there was less competition. Thus a book on the Cistercian monks (№ 95 – Le rêve cistercien) was one of the bestsellers in 1990. While the others like La fièvre de l'or (№ 34, about gold rush) or Sous le pavillon noir : Pirates et flibustiers (№ 45, about pirates) are presumably subjects more common and popular, were relative failures. Generally, the most popular titles are those from Arts and Archéologie series, the 1^{st} title À la recherche de l'Égypte oubliée and the 24^{th} title L'écriture, mémoire des hommes—both in Archéologie series—remain two of the bestsellers. As of 2001, the former would have sold more than five hundred thousand copies worldwide. As for the Sports et jeux series, there are only four most favoured titles: La saga du Tour de France (№ 81), La balle au pied : Histoire du football (№ 83), Jeux Olympiques : La flamme de l'exploit (№ 133) and Voyous et gentlemen : Une histoire du rugby (№ 164). Competition has emerged as early as in the middle of the 1990s, with a gradual decrease in circulation and novelties, but partially offset by the sub-collection entitled Découvertes Gallimard Hors série, which is one of the five spin-offs.

Today, about fifteen old titles are updated every year according to current cultural and scientific research. As general history plays a central role in "Découvertes Gallimard", completed by archaeology, art history and science, richly accompanied by unpublished illustrations, thus it forms a solid editorial base. On 25 March 1994, a celebration was held at the Musée national des Monuments Français, for the publication of the 200^{th} title Voyages en Utopie. The collection experienced two successive redesigns, one in September 1998 (№ 359 – Le Théâtre de Boulevard : « Ciel, mon mari ! ») for exterior model (colour of the back cover, more explicit signage), and the other in March 2000 (№ 390 – L'Esprit des savoirs) for interior page layout. Those reeditions underwent a decrease in page length, due to the reformulation introduced in the "Documents" section. The collection, which was too soon associated with a zapping visual culture, reaffirmed its first purpose: the image does not take precedence over the text, but combined with text to animate and enrich the reading. These books benefit from the latest technologies, with their mockups are all made using desktop publishing now. Since the QuarkXPress software was only released in 1987, the first 30 titles were made in a traditional way, with phototypesetting. The current price of a "Découvertes" book is between 8.40 and 15.90 euros (£7.95 in UK, $12.95–$14.95 in US and $19.95 in Canada) according to its category and number of pages, this is considered a low price for a book of this quality.

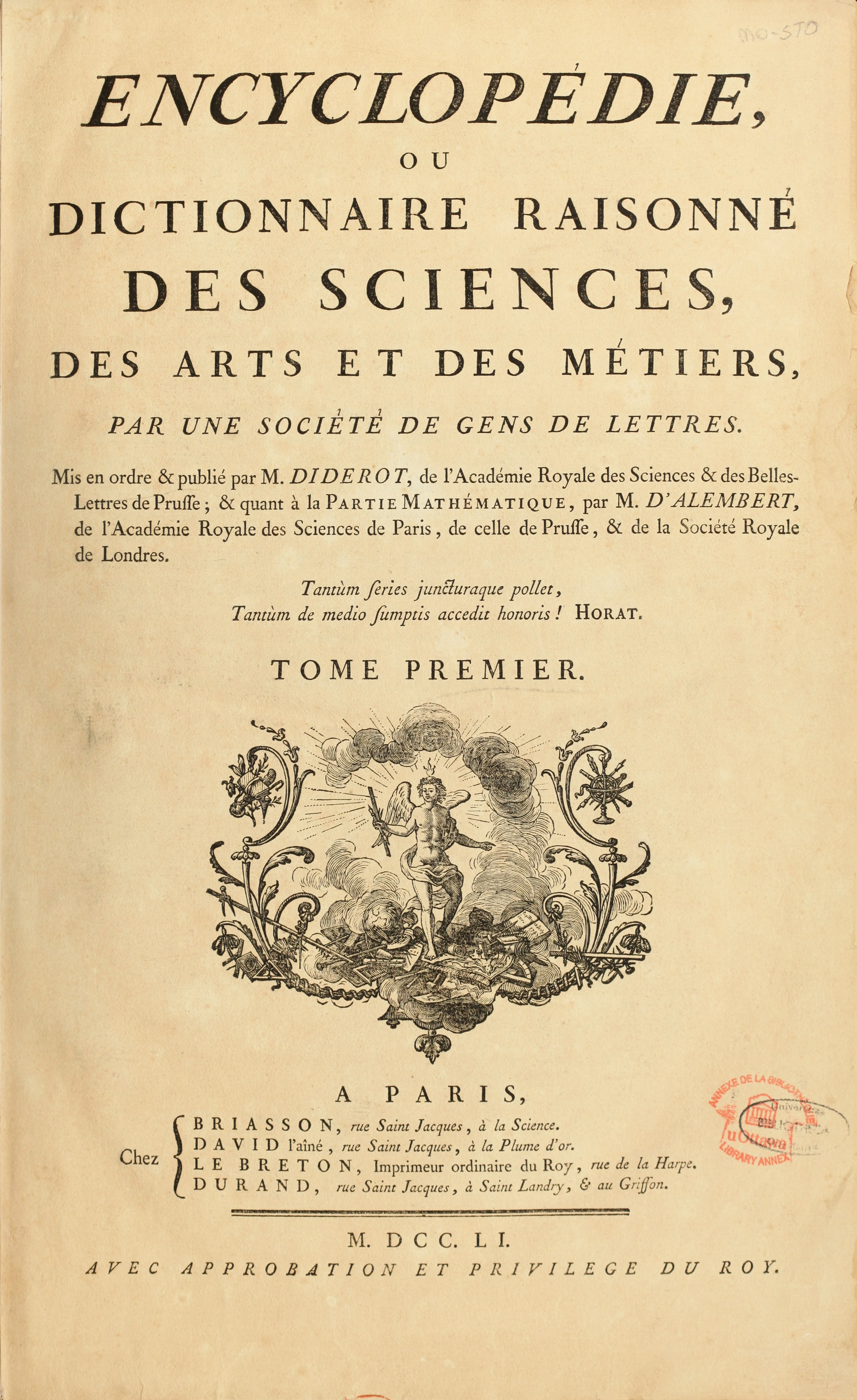
The Encyclopédie is the first French encyclopaedia, a work edited by Denis Diderot and Jean le Rond d'Alembert and many other contributors. It was one of the first encyclopaedias to realise the form we would recognise today, also the first one to include contributions from many named contributors, and perhaps the most famous early encyclopaedia. The 100^{th} title Le Roman vrai de l'Encyclopédie ('True Novel of the Encyclopédie') is dedicated to this work.

The collection, totalling 588 volumes, is never entirely translated into another language, partial translations have been made available in 19 languages (currently more than 20 languages, see "International editions"). "This inexpensive pocket encyclopaedia embodies its humanistic dream: to make the most advanced state of knowledge available to everyone. Diderot and D'Alembert would not have denied it...", commented by Hedwige Pasquet, current directress of Gallimard Jeunesse. According to Livres Hebdo, these "French-style nonfictions" (documentaires « à la française ») have sold over twenty million copies worldwide as of 1999, with recently emerging markets in Asia and Eastern Europe, especially in Russia, about 100 titles have been published within four years. In 2002, during a presentation of "Découvertes Gallimard" in Moscow, the French ambassador to Russia Claude Blanchemaison told a Kommersant correspondent that he just finished reading De Kaboul à Samarcande : Les archéologues en Asie centrale (№ 411), one of the latest titles from the collection at the time, which he found particularly interesting.

In order to remedy the problems of international proprietaries and reproduction rights of works of art, co-publishers firstly define a number of titles, then they choose according to their own editorial line, and share the high cost of worldwide photographic rights. Therefore, Harry N. Abrams in the United States chose more titles on traditional cultural subjects, such as À la recherche de la Rome antique (№ 56) or La Naissance de la Grèce (№ 86); while in Japan, the publisher Sōgensha prefers original titles, such as the 57^{th} title Les sorcières, fiancées de Satan ('Witches: Fiancées of Satan'), and the 171^{st} title L'Heure du grand passage : Chronique de la mort ('The Hour of the Great Passage: Chronicle of Death'). The Madrilenian publisher Aguilar was the first one among "Découvertes"' international co-publishers since 1989, the first 12 titles for the Spanish collection Aguilar Universal were released in the same year. In Italy, the publisher Electa/Gallimard produced 128 titles within seven years; in Japan, the 166^{th} title for their series Chi no Saihakken ('Rediscovery of Knowledge') has been published in early 2017. In addition, foreign editions are usually co-printed to amortise fees and support countries with small circulation.

In addition to foreign publishers, Découvertes Gallimard has also been involved in national institutional partnerships for several years, notably the one held since 1989 with the Réunion des Musées Nationaux (RMN): thirty-two titles have been released (as of 2001), plus a title in English dedicated to Jean-Baptiste-Camille Corot (№ 277 – Corot: Extraordinary landscapes), the boxed set Impressionnismes (1994) and four books in the "Hors série". The principle of these co-editions is based on a sharing of costs and revenues, the RMN brings its knowledge of museums and distribution network, while the publisher brings its editorial competence. When a title is linked to an exhibition, it generates a lot of additional sales through the RMN. Other partnerships with public or private companies, such as the French Alternative Energies and Atomic Energy Commission (№ 282 – L'atome, de la recherche à l'industrie : Le Commissariat à l'Énergie Atomique), Crédit Mutuel (№ 379 – L'odyssée de l'euro), L'Oréal (№ 405 – Les vies du cheveu (Note: English edition – Hair: The Long and the Short of It.)), paper industries (№ 369 – Le papier : Une aventure au quotidien), et cetera. The partner is sometimes explicitly indicated in the "acknowledgments" (№ 379), but it is most often mentioned equivocally (№ 405), even modestly kept in silence (№ 389 – Vive l'eau).

Nonfiction book publishing has been in decline in France for several years, market saturation is one of the causes, competition from other medias is another, especially from the internet. Despite its positive reception among readers, Découvertes Gallimard is also concerned by this disaffection. It continues to sell internationally, but in France, the sales are eroding. The number of new productions decreases and also the prints. On 1 March 1999, the creator of Découvertes, Pierre Marchand, after working for 27 years at Gallimard, left to become a creative director at Hachette. This represented a significant change for the collection, but with more than 10 years of experience and a rich fund created over years, Découvertes finally surpassed the difficulties. The end of 2006 is marked by the celebration of the collection's 20^{th} anniversary and the publication of its 500^{th} title Art brut : L'instinct créateur. A website was specially created on this occasion, which is the current official website http://www.decouvertes-gallimard.fr. On the occasion of Éditions Gallimard's centenary in 2011, the 569^{th} title Gallimard : Un éditeur à l'œuvre ('Gallimard: A Publisher at Work') was launched as the first e-book for iPad of "Découvertes". This was followed by an e-book collection consisting of À la recherche de l'Égypte oubliée, Dalí : Le Grand Paranoïaque, Hopper : Ombre et lumière du mythe américain, Léonard de Vinci : Art et science de l'univers, Manet : « J'ai fait ce que j'ai vu » and Mozart : Aimé des dieux in the next year.

== Image ==
The iconographie

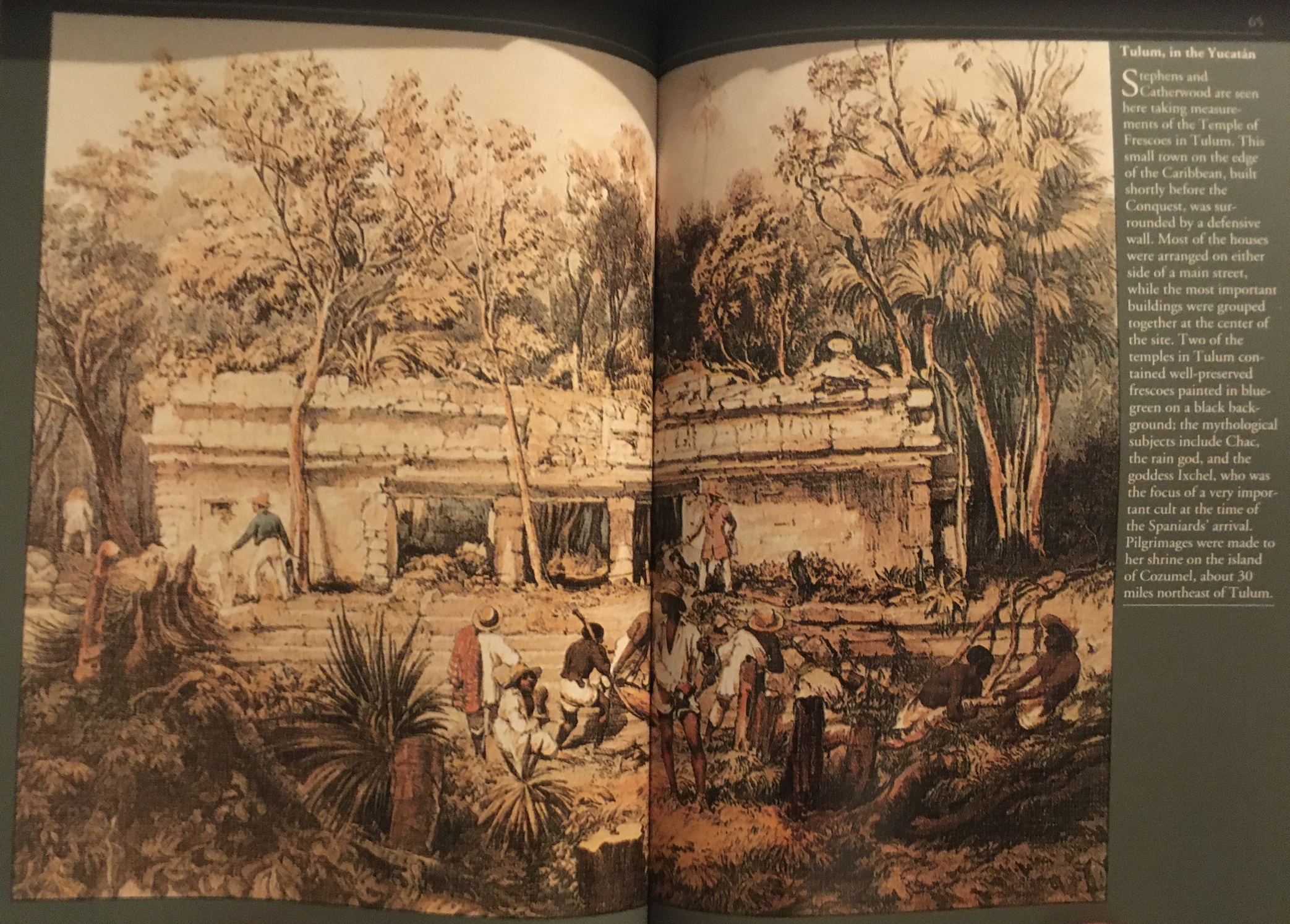
Double-page spread of image in Lost Cities of the Maya (pp. 64–65). Drawing by Frederick Catherwood, 1844.

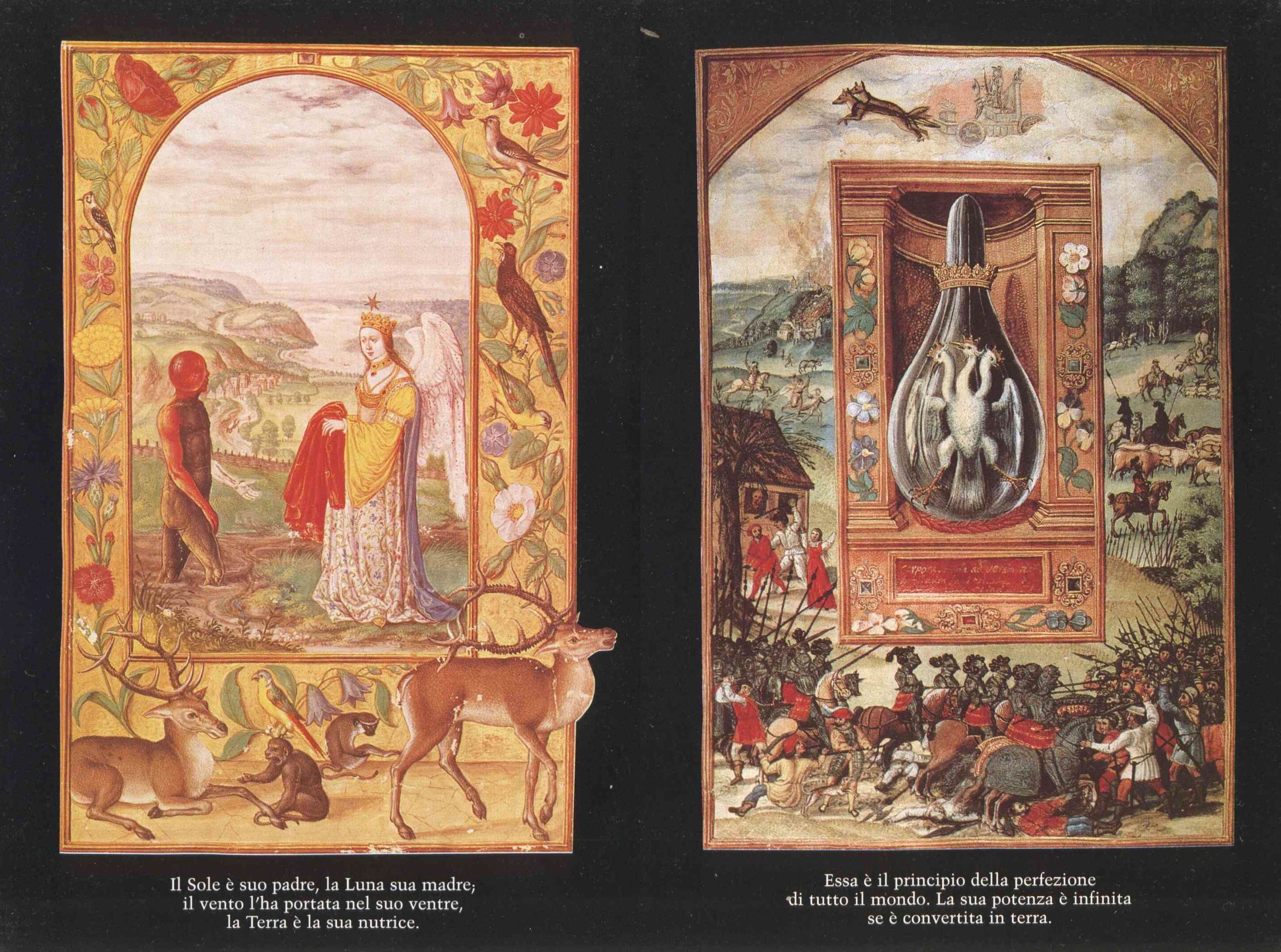
"Trailer" of Alchemy: The Great Secret (pp. 4–5). Illustrations taken from Splendor Solis, 16^{th} century, accompanied by texts from Emerald Tablet.

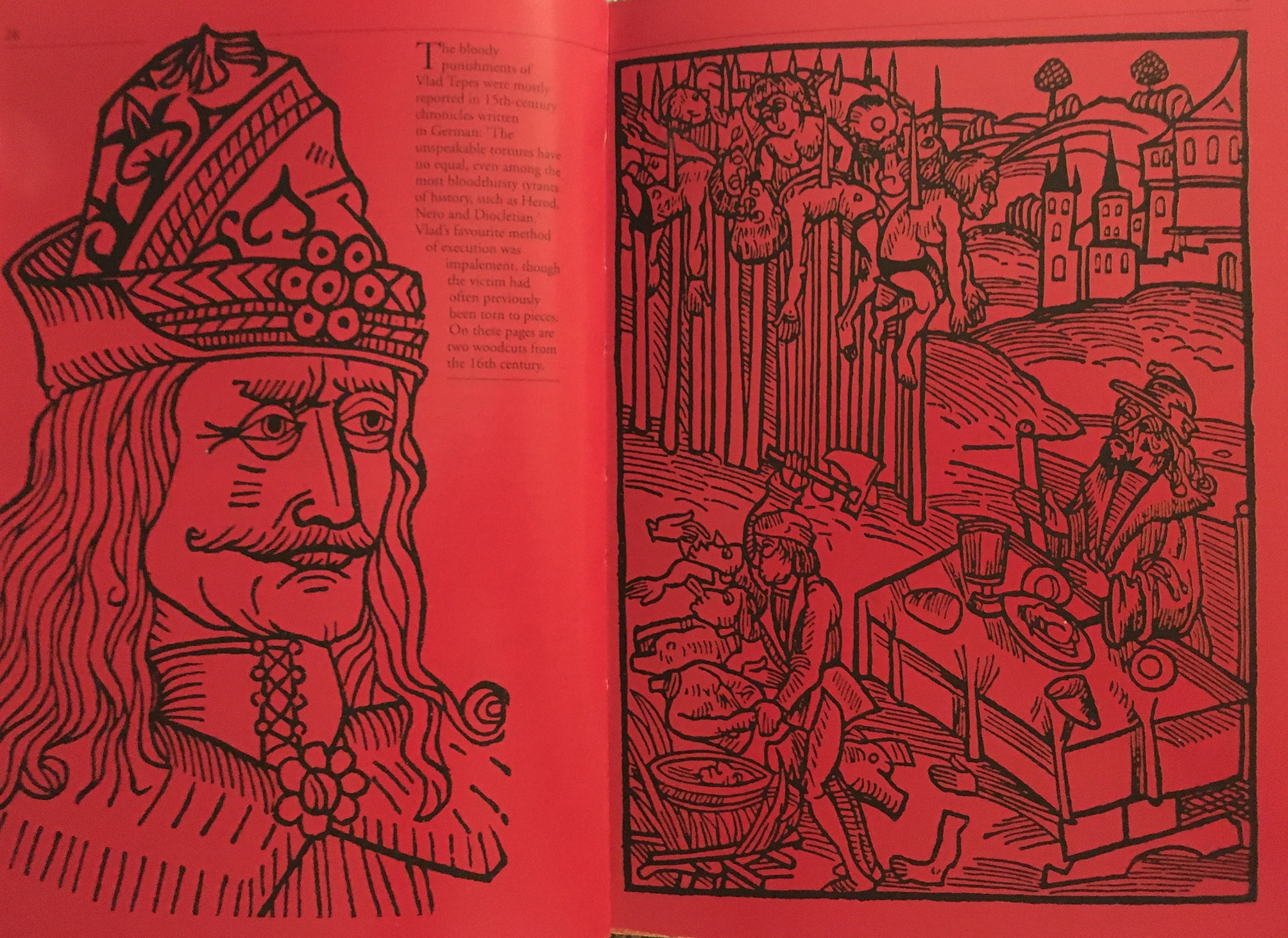
Full red background pages with engravings depicting Vlad the Impaler in Vampires: The World of the Undead (pp. 28–29).

Image (illustration, designated as iconographie in French) is the essential part to Découvertes Gallimard, the collection draws much inspiration from magazine layout designs. Full colour pictures, documentary illustrations, archival photographs, historical maps occupy a central place in this work, as said Pierre Marchand himself: "the language of images is a universal language". But in the 1980s, desktop publishing and photo digitisation did not exist, the sophisticated mockups were entirely handmade and the iconographers ran around museums, libraries, painting galleries and other agencies to look for documents. Today, the technology has simplified all these procedures but the difficulty lies elsewhere, the status of the image is increasingly complex.

Contemporary subjects often generate much higher costs since the publisher is obliged to work with photographic agencies. In the choice of documents, priority is given to those original, unpublished images. Besides, the iconographers of Découvertes have some exceptional documents, such as English explorer Frederick Catherwood's original drawings of Maya ruins decorate the 20^{th} title Les cités perdues des Mayas.

It's not difficult to illustrate subjects like arts, civilisations, archaeology... But when it comes to a topic like "pain" (№ 370 – La douleur : Un mal à combattre) or "sustainable development" (№ 495 – Le développement durable : Maintenant ou jamais), it becomes more delicate. The question is how to avoid repetitiveness or the flatly illustrative image, the solution lies in a broadening field, through the use of historical documents, works of art and film stills.

== Case study of aestheticisation movement ==
The aestheticisation of postmodern everyday life, according to sociologists Michel Maffesoli and Mike Featherstone, it seems to spring from two parallel movements rooted in modernity, the so-called "dual postmodern aestheticisation movement": first an aesthetic hedonism (Maffesoli) and second the trivialisation of art (Featherstone). The second movement is the result of the de-academisation and de-institutionalisation of art, thus "art is part of everyday life". Découvertes Gallimard is considered an example of 'art as part of everyday life' within this study.

Pierre Marchand, Head of Gallimard Jeunesse who created the new kind of artistic encyclopaedia with a dynamic layout, that would be as much a magazine as an encyclopaedia. It has been commented by a Gallimard employee that Découvertes "seduces like a magazine but has the length of a book", kind of an objectified and specialised luxury magazine. A lot of work and research have been done on the reproduction of images and the choice of illustrations, often unpublished documents like antique engravings, old photos, on all types of themes. In this collection, all books share the same concept as to layout and looks, each book itself could become a work of art rather than only its substitute. It is coupled with up-to-date editing equipment, organisational innovations and a constant pursuit of higher printing quality at lower cost. A more friendship than business relationship between Marchand and the Italian printer Gianni Stavro has advanced the state of the art in printing. The suppliers of "Découvertes" are supposed to cooperate between themselves, "for instance, the French printer had a problem concerning the pigments, so the Italian printer invited him over to explain how he could solve the problem", explained by a Gallimard employee.

Pierre Marchand's employees at Découvertes work as a team, sharing common culture and values. The office layout is modeled after a vessel, where Marchand serves as manager and employees are permitted to contribute ideas regarding authors, imagery, and cover designs, leading individual projects.

== Spin-offs ==
- Une autre histoire du XX^{e} siècle: Literally 'Another History of the 20^{th} Century'. A closed series within Découvertes Gallimard collection released in 1999, consisting of ten volumes for ten decades, authored by French historian Michel Pierre and based on Gaumont's cinematographic archives.
- Découvertes Gallimard Hors série: A sub-collection published since 1994, the title roughly translates as 'off-series' or 'off-collection'. "Hors série" books are even smaller (120 × 170 mm, generally, but not always), each one consists of 48 pages with full colour illustrations. These books are designed like museum guide booklets, according to Gallimard, "des livres à visiter comme une exposition" ('books to visit like an exhibition'). Most of them are dedicated to artists like Botticelli, Arcimboldo, Fragonard, Soutine, Le Gray, et cetera, during major exhibitions devoted to them.
- Découvertes Gallimard Albums: A sub-collection consists of 13 volumes, 12 volumes released in 1992 and one in 1994, a larger format (210 × 270 mm) is used for them.
- Découvertes Gallimard Texto: A 6-volume sub-collection released in 1998 (124 × 178 mm), inspired by the "Documents" section at the back of every Découvertes book.
- Découvertes Gallimard Carnet d'expo: A sub-collection of exhibition booklets created in 2018, with the smaller format (120 × 170 mm).

The "Hors série" books are often coupled with art exhibitions and it works well. While the other attempts to diversify the collection have often resulted in resounding commercial failures, such as the "Albums" and "Texto". Despite an interesting concept: the use of still images from Gaumont archives for "Une autre histoire du XX^{e} siècle", this series has had mixed success.

== English edition ==
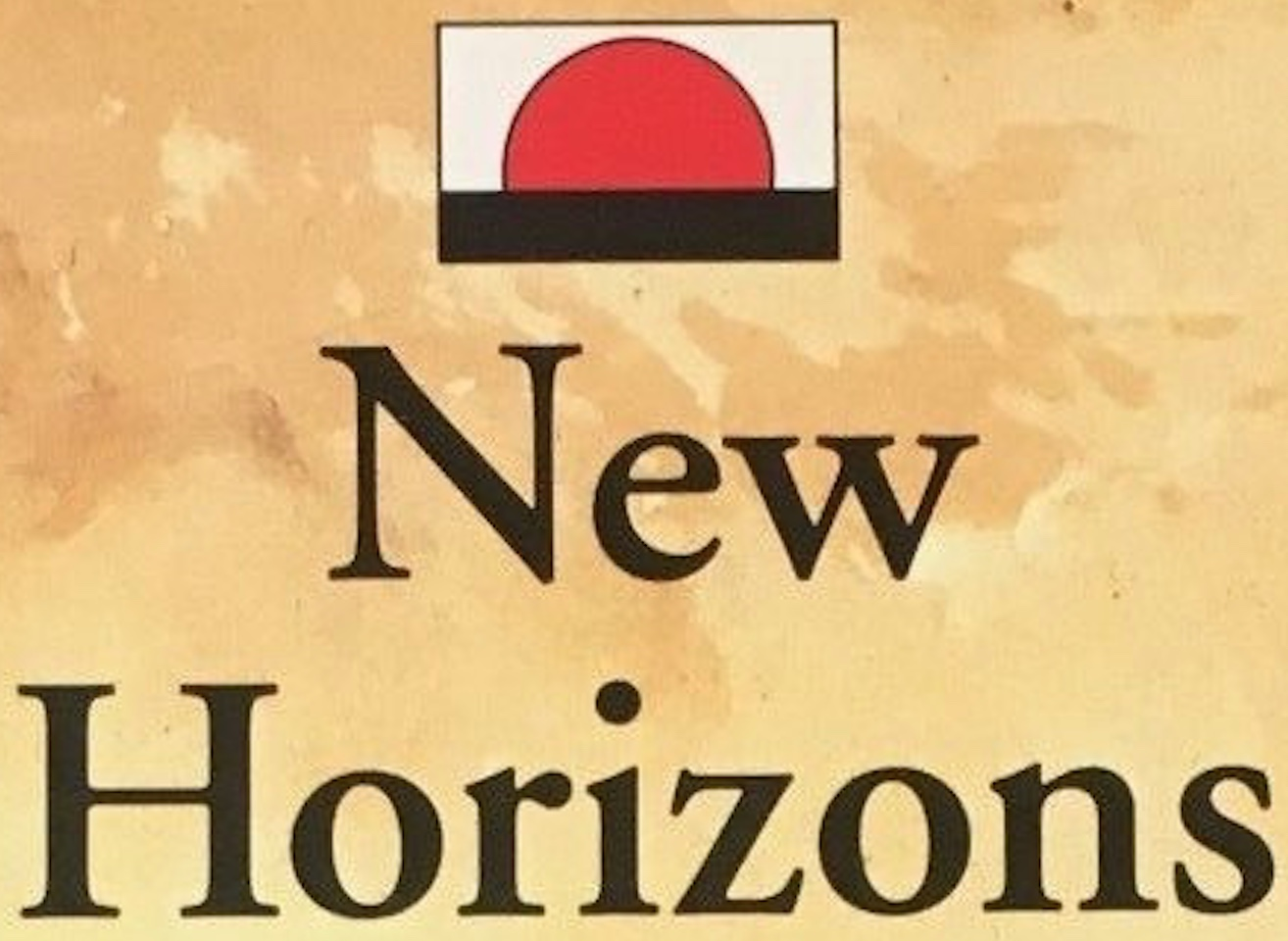
Logo of 'New Horizons' series.

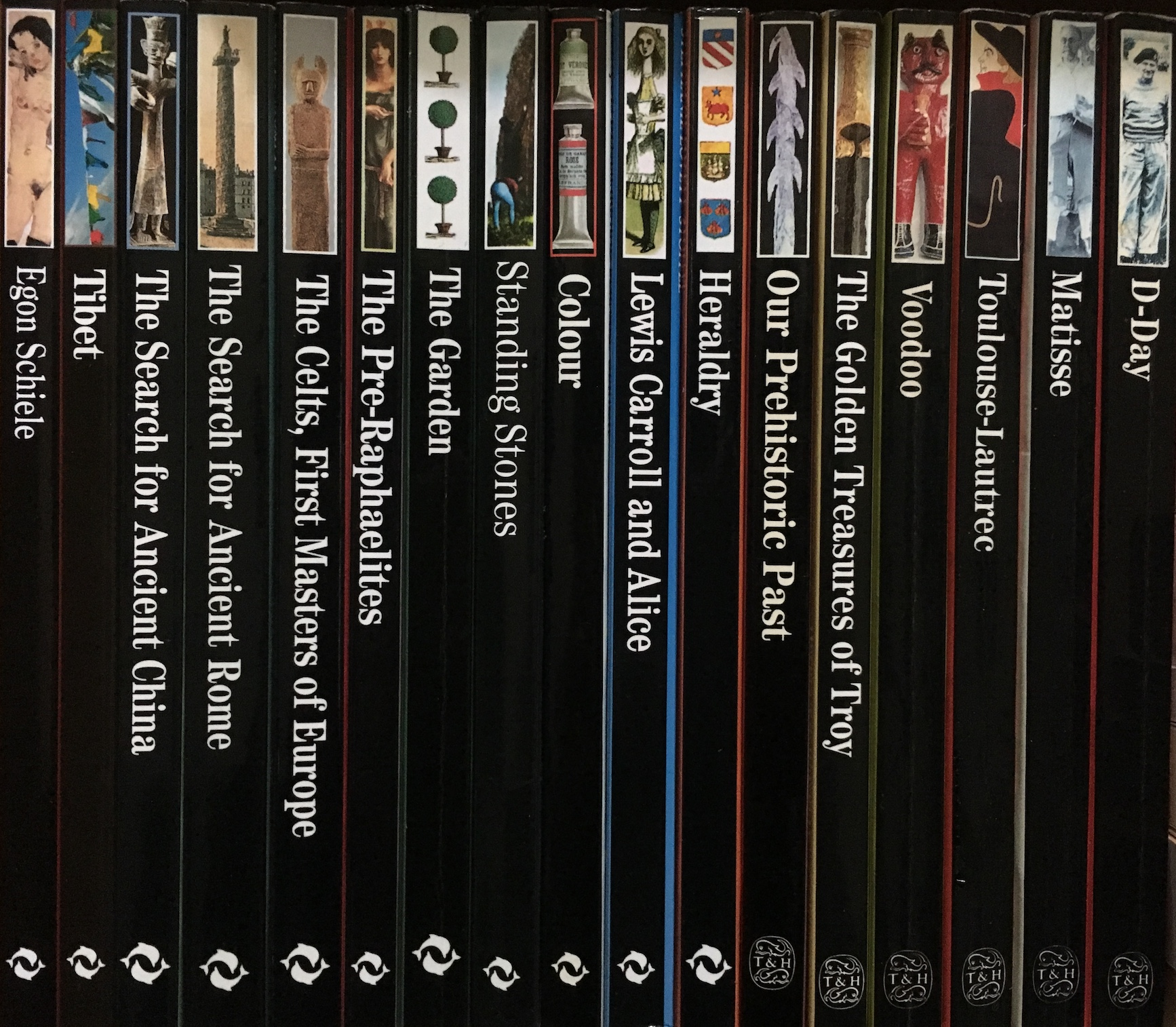
'New Horizons', the UK edition.

A small portion of the collection has been translated into English, published by Thames & Hudson in United Kingdom under the title New Horizons series, which launched its first titles in 1992 with the slogan, "the expanding universe between two covers". According to Thames & Hudson director Jamie Camplin, the remit is to "educate in an entertaining way".

Paul Gottlieb, former director and editor in chief of the New York-based publisher Abrams Books (then called Harry N. Abrams), discovered Pierre Marchand's "Découvertes" at the Gallimard stand during the Bologna Book Fair in 1991, which he called "a dazzling array of books" and an "imaginative combination of text and pictures in a magnificently produced series of paperback books". He began to negotiate for English language translation. The collection was eventually titled Abrams Discoveries series by the U.S. publisher. They began to publish in the spring of 1992, and more than 100 titles were produced by 2008.

The two publishers shared the translation costs, the American edition was then re-edited to take into account English spelling, or vice versa. Unlike the numbered French edition, American and British editions are not put into numerical order. UK edition's book spines have titles in white with black background, while the more Gallimard-style US edition has titles in colour and sometimes with decorative features, such as an ☥ for Cleopatra: The Life and Death of a Pharaoh and a ⚜ for Heraldry: An Introduction to a Noble Tradition.

Apart from spelling and punctuation differences, certain titles of American edition have additional explanation placed in parentheses within the body text. For instance, in The Celts: Conquerors of Ancient Europe: "Bohemia (now part of the Czech Republic)" (p. 14), "Gaelic (meaning an Irish or Scottish Celt)" (p. 14), or "Iberian Peninsula (Spain and Portugal)" (p. 76); whereas in the British version The Celts: First Masters of Europe, has no such additional information. Besides, the texts are not entirely identical. As for the "Documents" section, though some co-publishers print the entire French version, Thames & Hudson reformulates this part, tailoring the material to suit the nuances of the UK market.

== Reception ==
French weekly magazine Télérama praised "Découvertes Gallimard", described the work as: "they borrow suspense from the cinema, have efficiency of the journalism, literary temperament is their charm, and art is their beauty". New York magazine remarked the collection "a lively interweaving of simple text and clever pictures". In his review for Die Zeit, the German literary scholar and historian Gerhard Prause wrote that the collection is an "adventure stands for surprise, excitement and amusement. Boredom is already prevented by the curiosity of vivid illustrations which are accompanied by detailed explanations". Rick Poynor wrote in Eye magazine that the collection "is one of the great projects of contemporary popular publishing". Raleigh Trevelyan's article in The New York Times mentioned D-Day and the Invasion of Normandy from "Abrams Discoveries" series, said "all volumes in the 'Discoveries' series are ingeniously designed". Art critic John Russell considered these books contain unique information, such as Aelian's authority on the musicality of the elephant or the precise look of Halley's Comet as it was depicted in 1835. Eduardo Gudiño Kieffer of La Nación also gave the collection a positive review, writing, "The books are excellent assistants for intellectuals, writers, journalists and students of different aspects of the culture, [...] they contain accurate and pithy information. [...] They obtain a cognitive 'duration' difficult to achieve in the mediatic fugacity." The Spanish newspaper El País: "Those books combine an important 'Documents' section with an original thematic concept. It's obviously a work of education and popularisation, but popularisation of very good level." The Brazilian newspapers – Folha de S.Paulo: "What is most striking in the collection, however, is not the eclecticism or the unusual themes—usually developed by French experts—but the format and the iconographic content thereof."; Diário do Grande ABC: "almost like a luxury comic magazine and of exquisite taste".

According to the French magazine L'Expansion, some other positive reviews including The Times: "A brand-new and daring collection"; Die Zeit: "As soon as you open these handy books, you can not get away from them anymore"; The New York Times Book Review: "A collection that recalls nineteenth-century encyclopaedias, where intelligence went hand in hand with curiosity". The French news magazine L'Express: "Genuine monographs, published like art books, offered in pocket format and sold at an affordable price. [...] 'Découvertes' changed the face of encyclopaedism and art book, adapting the book to the era of 'zapping'." Le Journal des Arts—a French bimonthly journal—referred to the collection as a "classic". It is also included by Livres Hebdo, a French weekly magazine, as one of six collections that marked the history of French publishing.

The collection suffers from two challenges in the bookstores. Firstly the bookshops' owners do not know where to put them, because it could be with books for youth or books for adults, and it could be with pocket books or encyclopedic books. Also instead of displaying the different books of the collection together, in a specially made display, bookshops scatter them on different thematic shelves.

Separately, the journalists do not present simple pocket books in their articles, despite the quality content of the collection.

== Documentary adaptation ==
Documentary adaptations of "Découvertes Gallimard" started in 1997, the project is a co-production of Arte France and Trans Europe Film, and in collaboration with Éditions Gallimard. These 52-minute films are produced as part of The Human Adventure, a documentary television programme of Arte. Nine of them were directed by Jean-Claude Lubtchansky.

List of documentary films:

Documentary	Literal translation	Director	Voice-over	Release year	Adaptation of	UK edition	US edition	Author
Il était une fois la Mésopotamie (subtitled into English)	'Once Upon a Time in Mesopotamia'	Jean-Claude Lubtchansky	François Marthouret, Corinne Jaber, Jean-Claude Lubtchansky	1998	Il était une fois la Mésopotamie (nº 191)	–	–	Jean Bottéro, Marie-Joseph Stève
Quand le Japon s'ouvrit au monde	'When Japan Opened to the World'	Jean-Claude Lubtchansky	François Marthouret, Michel Duchaussoy	1998	Quand le Japon s'ouvrit au monde (nº 99)	–	–	Francis Macouin, Keiko Omoto
Galilée, le messager des étoiles	'Galileo, the Messenger of the Stars'	Jean-Claude Lubtchansky	François Marthouret, Ruggero De Pas	1998	Galilée : Le messager des étoiles (nº 10)	–	–	Jean-Pierre Maury
Vers Tombouctou : L'Afrique des explorateurs	'On the Road to Timbuktu: Explorers in Africa'	Jean-Claude Lubtchansky	François Marthouret, Yves Lambrecht, Richard Sammel	1999	Vers Tombouctou : L'Afrique des explorateurs II (nº 216)	–	–	Anne Hugon
Les cités perdues des Mayas (subtitled into English)^{:43}	'The Lost Cities of the Mayans'	Jean-Claude Lubtchansky	François Marthouret, Marc Zammit	2000	Les cités perdues des Mayas (nº 20)	Lost Cities of the Maya	Lost Cities of the Maya	Claude-François Baudez, Sydney Picasso
Champollion, un scribe pour l'Égypte (subtitled into English)^{:42}	'Champollion, a scribe for Egypt'	Jean-Claude Lubtchansky	Françoise Fabian, Jean-Hugues Anglade	2000	Champollion : Un scribe pour l'Égypte (nº 96)	–	–	Michel Dewachter
Léonard de Vinci (dubbed into English)	'Leonardo da Vinci'	Jean-Claude Lubtchansky	Aurore Clément, Gérard Desarthe	2001	Léonard de Vinci : Art et science de l'univers (nº 293)	Leonardo da Vinci: Renaissance Man	Leonardo da Vinci: The Mind of the Renaissance	Alessandro Vezzosi
L'empire des nombres (dubbed into English)	'The Empire of Numbers'	Philippe Truffault	Denis Guedj	2001	L'empire des nombres (nº 300)	Numbers: The Universal Language	Numbers: The Universal Language	Denis Guedj
La Terre des Peaux-Rouges	'The Land of the Redskins'	Jean-Claude Lubtchansky	Serge Avédikian, François Marthouret	2002	La Terre des Peaux-Rouges (nº 14)	–	–	Philippe Jacquin
Angkor, la forêt de pierre (available in English)^{:40&286}	'Angkor, the Stone Forest'	Jean-Claude Lubtchansky	Serge Avédikian, Sylvie Moreau	2002	Angkor : La forêt de pierre (nº 64)	Angkor: Heart of an Asian Empire	Angkor: Heart of an Asian Empire	Bruno Dagens
Darwin et la science de l'évolution	'Darwin and the Science of Evolution'	Valérie Winckler	Claude Aufaure, Valérie Winckler	2002	Darwin et la science de l'évolution (nº 397)	Charles Darwin: The Scholar Who Changed Human History	Darwin and the Science of Evolution	Patrick Tort
Le Mystère des sources du Nil (dubbed into English)	'The Mystery of the Sources of the Nile'	Stéphane Bégoin	Séverine Lathuillière, Jacques-Henri Fabre, Vincent Grass, José Luccioni, Serge Marquant	2003	L'Afrique des explorateurs : Vers les sources du Nil (nº 117)	The Exploration of Africa: From Cairo to the Cape	The Exploration of Africa: From Cairo to the Cape	Anne Hugon

== International editions ==
Title	Literal translation	Language	Country	Publisher	First published
Découvertes Gallimard	'Gallimard Discoveries'	French of France	France	Éditions Gallimard	1986
New Horizons	–	British English	United Kingdom	Thames & Hudson	1992
Abrams Discoveries	–	American English	United States	Harry N. Abrams	1992
Universale Electa/Gallimard	'Electa/Gallimard Universal'	Italian	Italy	Electa/Gallimard	1992
Universale L'ippocampo	'L'ippocampo Universal'	Italian	Italy	L'ippocampo Edizioni	2011
Aguilar Universal	'Aguilar Universal'	Peninsular Spanish	Spain	Aguilar, S. A. de Ediciones	1989
Biblioteca ilustrada	'Illustrated Library'	Peninsular Spanish	Spain	Blume	2011
Biblioteca de bolsillo CLAVES	'Pocket Library KEYS'	Spanish	Spain, Hispanic America	Ediciones B	1997
Civilização/Círculo de Leitores	'Civilisation/Readers' Circle'	European Portuguese	Portugal	Civilização Editora, Círculo de Leitores	1991
Descobrir	'Discover'	European Portuguese	Portugal	Quimera Editores	2003
Descobertas	'Discoveries'	Brazilian Portuguese	Brazil	Editora Objetiva	2000
En värld av vetande	'A World of Knowledge'	Swedish	Sweden	Berghs förlag	1991
Horisont-bøkene	'Horizon Books'	Norwegian	Norway	Schibsted	1990
Ny viden om nyt og gammelt	'New Knowledge on New and Old'	Danish	Denmark	Roth	1993
Abenteuer Geschichte	'Adventure Story'	German	Germany	Ravensburger Buchverlag	1990
Fibula Pharos	'Fibula's Pharos'	Dutch	Netherlands	Fibula-Van Dishoek	1990
Standaard Ontdekkingen	'Standaard Discoveries'	Dutch	Belgium, Netherlands	Standaard Uitgeverij	1990
Krajobrazy Cywilizacji	'Landscapes of Civilisation'	Polish	Poland	Wydawnictwo Dolnośląskie	1994
Poznać i Zrozumieć Świat – Focus	'Know and Understand the World – Focus'	Polish	Poland	Gruner+Jahr Polska	2002
Horizonty	'Horizons'	Czech	Czech Republic	Nakladatelství Slovart	1994
Horizonty	'Horizons'	Slovak	Slovakia	Vydavateľstvo Slovart	1994
Kréta könyvek	'Chalk Books'	Hungarian	Hungary	Park Kiadó	1991
Mejniki	'Milestones'	Slovene	Slovenia	DZS	1994
Atradimai Baltos lankos	'Baltos lankos Discoveries'	Lithuanian	Lithuania	Baltos lankos	1997
Découvertes Univers: Colecțiile Cotidianul. Enciclopedica	'Univers Discoveries: Cotidianul. Encyclopaedic Collections'	Romanian	Romania	Editura Univers (in collaboration with Cotidianul)	2007
Genel Kültür Dizisi	'General Culture Series'	Turkish	Turkey	Yapı Kredi Yayınları	2001
Ανακαλύψεις Δεληθανάση	'Delithanasi Discoveries'	Greek	Greece	Αστέρης Δεληθανάσης (Asteris Delithanasis)	1990
Открытие	'Discovery'	Russian	Russia	AST	2001
Биография искусства	'Biography of the Arts'	Russian	Russia	Mann, Ivanov and Ferber	2019
اكتشافات غاليمار	'Gallimard Discoveries'	Lebanese Arabic	Lebanon	دار المجاني (Dar Al Majani; lit. 'Free House')	2011
知の再発見	'Rediscovery of Knowledge'	Japanese	Japan	Sōgensha	1990
發現之旅 (Voyage D'exploration)	'Voyage of Discoveries'	Traditional Chinese	Taiwan	China Times Publishing	1994
发现之旅 (Voyage D'exploration)	'Voyage of Discoveries'	Simplified Chinese	China	Published by various publishers	1998
시공 디스커버리 총서 (Sigong Discovery)	'Sigong Discovery series'	Korean	South Korea	Sigongsa	1995

== See also ==
- For Dummies, a similar American series of introductory reference books.
- Mysteries of the Unknown, an American occult series by Time Life.
- Que sais-je?, a similar series of introductory books published by the Presses Universitaires de France.
- Rough Guides, a similar British series of introductory tourism books.
- Very Short Introductions, a similar series of introductory books published by the Oxford University Press.
- World of Art, an illustrated art encyclopaedia series published by Thames & Hudson.

== Sources ==
- In the beginning was the picture: NEW HORIZONS by Jim Davies at Eye
- Revelations in style: Gallimard's Découvertes series secures readers' loyalty by showing respect for their curiosity and intelligence by Rick Poynor at Eye
- (in French) Découvertes Gallimard ou la culture encyclopédique à la française by Françoise Hache-Bissette, senior lecturer at the Paris Descartes University. This article is published in the conference proceedings at Sorbonne in December 2001 (pp. 111–124 of Histoire des industries culturelles en France, XIX^{e}–XX^{e} siècles : Actes du colloque en Sorbonne, décembre 2001).
