= Bruno Dagens =

French archaeologist (1935–2023)

- Born: 1935; Nijmegen, Netherlands
- Died: 17 September 2023
- Occupations: Archaeologist, art historian, Sanskritist
- Notable work: Angkor: Heart of an Asian Empire

Bruno Dagens (1935 – 17 September 2023) was a French archaeologist, art historian, Sanskritist, and a specialist on Angkor Wat. He was a professor emeritus of the University of Sorbonne Nouvelle Paris 3.

== Career ==
Dagens began to study archaeology in his early years in Afghanistan, influenced by Daniel Schlumberger. After his graduation in history and archaeology, as well as Sanskrit, he performed various internships with the French Archaeological Delegation in Afghanistan. From 1957 to 1964, he participated in the excavations at Mundigak and Surkh Kotal and carried out research on the so-called Greco-Buddhist art (Hadda and Bactria). In 1964, he undertook the translation of Mayamata, a Sanskrit treatise on architecture. He obtained the CAPES of history and geography and taught from 1964 to 1965 in Obernai. Then he was seconded to the Ministry of Foreign Affairs as an expert for the Angkor Conservation from 1965 to 1969. He joined the École française d'Extrême-Orient (EFEO) in 1969, and remained in office for three years in Cambodia, while carrying out parallel missions in India (Pondicherry, 1969 and 1972), Thailand (Phimai, 1969) and Laos (Vat Phou, 1969).

In Cambodia, Dagens conducted scientific activity in three topics: research on the iconography and architecture of monuments of the Angkorian period accompanied by systematic surveys; research on statuary, centered on the elaboration of a detailed catalogue of the Buddhist pieces from the sculpture depot of the Angkor Conservation; philological work on Mayamata, completed by monumental studies in Cambodia and India (Kerala and Tamil Nadu).

From 1972 to 1977, he was a lecturer at the Université catholique de Louvain and regularly travelled to Pondicherry. In October 1977, he was appointed director of the Indology section at the French Institute of Pondicherry. During the period 1972 to 1986, his research focused on the texts and monuments of South India. He spent nine years in Pondicherry studying Shaivite temples and scriptures.

In 1986, he became Professor of Ancient History and Archaeology of South and Southeast Asia at the University of Paris III and has remained in that position since. He is also the director of the Unité de formation et de recherche and responsible for EFEO programmes. His monograph Angkor : La forêt de pierre (collection "Découvertes Gallimard", 1989) was published as Angkor: Heart of an Asian Empire in 1995, and has been adapted into a documentary film with the same title in 2002, as part of The Human Adventure. He has also done work dealing with the Khmer and the Indian temple – The Indian Temple: Mirror of the World, originally published in French in 2009.

== Selected publications ==
- Angkor : La forêt de pierre, coll. « Découvertes Gallimard » (nº 64), série Archéologie. Éditions Gallimard, 1989
  - US edition – Angkor: Heart of an Asian Empire, "Abrams Discoveries" series. Harry N. Abrams, 1995
  - UK edition – Angkor: Heart of an Asian Empire, ‘New Horizons’ series. Thames & Hudson, 1995
- Les Khmers, coll. « Guides Belles Lettres des civilisations » (nº 10). Les Belles Lettres, 2003
- With Marie-Luce Barazer-Billoret, Shiva : Libérateur des âmes et Maître des dieux, coll. « Découvertes Gallimard » (nº 450), série Religions. Éditions Gallimard, 2004
- Le Temple indien : Miroir du monde, coll. « Réalia » (nº 21). Les Belles Lettres, 2009
  - The Indian Temple: Mirror of the World, New Age Books and Indira Gandhi National Centre for the Arts, 2016
- With Marie-Luce Barazer-Billoret, Shiva, coll. « Albums Beaux Livres », Éditions Gallimard, 2013

Translation

- Mayamuni, Mayamata : Traité Sanskrit d'Architecture, Institut Français d'Indologie, 1970
  - Mayamata: An Indian Treatise on Housing Architecture and Iconography, Sitaram Bhartia Institute of Scientific Research, 1985 (an updated edition published in 2017 by New Age Books)
