= The Exploration of Africa: From Cairo to the Cape =

1991 book by Anne Hugon

- First French edition. The cover featuring an illustration from Le Petit Journal, 1913.
- Author: Anne Hugon
- Original title: L'Afrique des explorateurs : Vers les sources du Nil
- Translator: Alexandra Campbell
- Cover artist: Anonymous (FR ed.); Pierre-Eugène Grandsire (US ed.); Thomas Baines & Anonymous (UK ed.)
- Language: French
- Series: Découvertes Gallimard●Histoire (FR); New Horizons (UK); Abrams Discoveries (US)
- Release number: 1st in series, 117th in collection
- Subject: European exploration of Africa
- Genre: Nonfiction monograph
- Publisher: Éditions Gallimard (FR); Harry N. Abrams (US); Thames & Hudson (UK)
- Publication date: 26 September 1991
- Publication place: France
- English publication date: 1993
- Media type: Print (paperback)
- Pages: 176 pp.
- ISBN: 978-2-0705-3130-1 (first edition)
- OCLC: 24832575
- Preceded by: Magnificat : Jean-Sébastien Bach, le cantor
- Followed by: Les Momies : Un voyage dans l'éternité

The Exploration of Africa: From Cairo to the Cape (French: L'Afrique des explorateurs : Vers les sources du Nil, lit. 'Explorers in Africa: To the Sources of the Nile') is a 1991 illustrated monograph on the European exploration of Africa. Written by the French Africanist and historian Anne Hugon, and published in pocket format by Éditions Gallimard as the 117th volume in their "Découvertes" collection (known as "Abrams Discoveries" in the United States, and "New Horizons" in the United Kingdom). In 2003, the book was adapted as a documentary film by the title Le Mystère des sources du Nil.

A sequel, Vers Tombouctou : L'Afrique des explorateurs II, was published in 1994, as the 216th volume of "Découvertes". Together, they form a "miniseries"—L'Afrique des explorateurs—in the collection.

== Introduction and synopsis ==
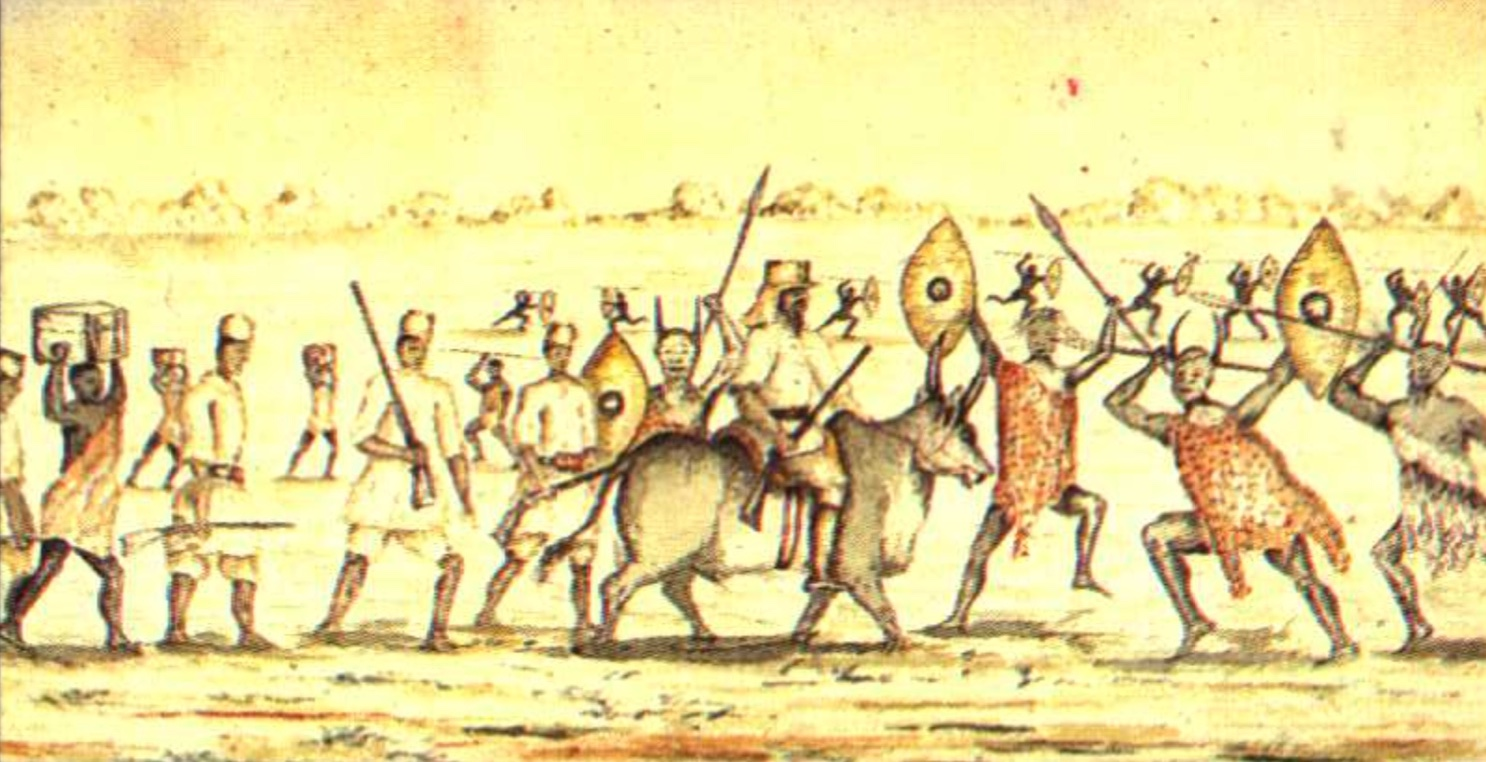
Leaving Mrooli for the Lake by Samuel Baker, 19th-century watercolour featured on the back cover.

The book is part of the Histoire series (formerly belonging to Invention du monde series) in the "Découvertes Gallimard" collection. According to the tradition of "Découvertes", which is based on an abundant pictorial documentation and a way of bringing together visual documents and texts, enhanced by printing on coated paper, as commented in L'Express, "genuine monographs, published like art books". It's almost like a "graphic novel", replete with colour plates.

The body text is divided into five chapters: I, "A World to Explore"; II, "The Mystery of the Source of the Nile"; III, "Livingstone's Mission in Southern Africa"; IV, "Into the Heart of the Forest"; V, "The Explorer's Profession". The text follows the steps of those explorers in Africa, such as Burton, Speke, Grant, Baker, Stanley, Livingstone, but also Brazza and Marchand. The main focus is on the Nile and Congo explorations and on Livingstone; it has nothing on West Africa, although Mary Kingsley makes an appearance. However, in the sequel Vers Tombouctou : L'Afrique des explorateurs II, West Africa is the focal point.

In less than fifty years, in the late 19th century, these explorers penetrated the heart of Africa, discovered the sources of the Nile, explored the Congo and Zambezi Basins, surveyed the Mountains of the Moon. But these explorers also revealed the riches of the black continent to the European colonisers. The "Documents" section at the back features excerpts from the explorers' own journals which is divided into five parts: 1, Preparing an Expedition; 2, The Explorers Confront Africa; 3, The Advent of Colonialism; 4, The Explorer's Changing Image; 5, Patrons. These are followed by a map, a chronology, further reading, list of illustrations and an index. The book has been translated into Dutch, English, German, Italian, Japanese, Russian, South Korean, Spanish, simplified and traditional Chinese.

== Reception ==
On Babelio, the book has an average of 4.0/5 based on 9 ratings. Goodreads reported, based on 11 ratings, the US edition gets an average rating of 3.55 out of 5, and the UK edition 3.60/5 based on 5 ratings, indicating "generally positive opinions".

In his book review for Africa (1994), the journal of the International African Institute, Professor Murray Last wrote: "Despite the small format, the book is distinguished by the huge number of colour illustrations taken from nineteenth century journals and other sources, the quality of the colour is remarkable. [...] I found the text much more interesting than most; it is neither overimpressed by travellers nor debunking of the whole exploratory enterprise, which, with its interest in maps, science and topography, is contrasted with trade and traders. It is a pity, perhaps, that the contrast is not made more of; a pity too that a comparison is not made with the preexisting caravan practice of Arab traders. But in such a small, compact format, text competes with illustration. As it stands, this little volume makes an intriguing, unconventional introduction to an important episode in both European and African cultural history."

== Adaptation ==
In 2003, the book was adapted into a documentary film by the title Le Mystère des sources du Nil, directed by Stéphane Bégoin, with voice-over narration by Séverine Lathuillière, Jacques-Henri Fabre, Vincent Grass, José Luccioni and Serge Marquant. A co-production between Arte France, Éditions Gallimard and La Compagnie des Taxi-Brousse, the film was released for Arte's documentary television programme The Human Adventure. It has been dubbed into German under the title Das Geheimnis der Nilquellen, and into English, with the title In Search of the Nile.

In an interview with Arte, the director explained the use of pictures in the documentary: "I sought to find the pictorial richness that made the success of these small books [from "Découvertes Gallimard"]. Specifically for this film, this is reflected in the mixture of different visual sources. There are the 'vignettes' that we talked about earlier, which are photomontages made from coloured prints."
