= Anne Hugon =

French Africanist

- Born: 1965 (age 60–61)
- Occupations: Historian, Africanist
- Notable work: The Exploration of Africa: From Cairo to the Cape

Anne Hugon (born 1965) is a French historian specialising in the history of African exploration.

== Career ==
Anne Hugon has worked for several years on the history of European exploration of Africa. She taught at the University of Lyon II and wrote a thesis on missionaries in Africa in the early 1990s.

She is currently a maître de conférences at the Pantheon-Sorbonne University where she is teaching 19th–20th century African history. She is also a member of the Institut des mondes africains, a joint interdisciplinary research unit associated with the French National Centre for Scientific Research.

Her studies and research themes on Africa include colonial history of Ghana, social history, history of colonisation, history of women and gender, history of medicine and history of cultural changes. She has authored several articles and books on the subject. She wrote L'Afrique des explorateurs : Vers les sources du Nil for the "Découvertes Gallimard" collection, an illustrated pocket book published in 1991 and has been translated into ten languages, including English. The book has been adapted into a documentary film titled Le mystère des sources du Nil ("Mystery of the Sources of the Nile") in 2003. A sequel to this book, Vers Tombouctou : L'Afrique des explorateurs II, released in 1994, has also been made into a documentary film with the same title.

In addition to articles and books authored by herself, Hugon has also translated the English explorer Mary Kingsley's account of her travels into French.

== Selected publications ==
- L'Afrique des explorateurs : Vers les sources du Nil, collection « Découvertes Gallimard » (nº 117), série Histoire. Éditions Gallimard, 1991
  - US edition – The Exploration of Africa: From Cairo to the Cape, "Abrams Discoveries" series. Harry N. Abrams, 1993
  - UK edition – The Exploration of Africa: From Cairo to the Cape, 'New Horizons' series. Thames & Hudson, 1993
- Vers Tombouctou : L'Afrique des explorateurs II, collection « Découvertes Gallimard » (nº 216), série Histoire. Éditions Gallimard, 1994
- Introduction à l'histoire de l'Afrique contemporaine, Armand Colin, 1998
- Histoire des femmes en situation coloniale : Afrique et Asie, XX^{e} siècle, Karthala, 2004
- Un protestantisme africain au XIX^{e} siècle : L'implantation du méthodisme en Gold Coast (Ghana), 1835–1874, Karthala, 2007
- Être mère en situation coloniale (Gold Coast, années 1910-1950). Paris: Éditions de la Sorbonne, 2020.

Translation

- Mary Kingsley, Une odyssée africaine : une exploratrice victorienne en Afrique de l'ouest, 1893–95, Phébus, 1992
