= The Human Adventure (TV series) =

French documentary television programme

- Also known as: Abenteuer Arte
- French: L'Aventure humaine
- Genre: Documentary
- Directed by: Various
- Presented by: Various
- Country of origin: France
- Original language: French

Production
- Running time: 52 or 90 minutes

Original release
- Network: Arte
- Release: 4 January 1997 – present

The Human Adventure (French: L'Aventure humaine; German: Abenteuer Arte) is a collection of French television documentaries about the distant cultures and worldwide historical sites. The first documentary aired on 4 January 1997 on the Franco-German TV channel Arte. In coproduction with Arte France and Trans Europe Film, in collaboration with Éditions Gallimard, the programme inaugurated the adaptation of the collection "Découvertes Gallimard" in the same year, telecast on Saturday evening at 8:45. Selected documentaries are available in English, for instance, Alexandrie la magnifique and The Mummies of Taklamakan.

== Synopsis ==
These documentaries use reenactments to tell the stories of past civilisations, looking for traces of ancient history of mankind and the scientific, technical and artistic discoveries that have shaped human history. Key players, periods and events in history are used to figure in the stories, from Maya empire, Mesopotamia to the exploration of Africa, from Ancient Egypt to the Taklamakan mummies, from Leonardo da Vinci, Louis the Sun King, Frederick the Great to Jean-François Champollion, etc., the series explores our planet, recounting mankind's achievements, development, lifestyles and religions. It also occasionally follows some spectacular scientific expeditions.

== Home video ==
The Human Adventure has been released on VHS and DVD by Arte Vidéo since 2002. The DVD edition features an English audio track.

== List of documentaries ==
Documentary	Director	Release year	Running time
La Route de millions d'années	Patrice Cazes	1997	52 minutes
Once Upon a Time in Mesopotamia	Jean-Claude Lubtchansky	1998	52 minutes
Quand le Japon s’ouvrit au monde	Jean-Claude Lubtchansky	1998	52 minutes
Alexandrie la magnifique	Thierry Ragobert	1998	52 minutes
Galilée, le messager des étoiles	Jean-Claude Lubtchansky	1999	52 minutes
On the Road to Timbuktu: Explorers in Africa	Jean-Claude Lubtchansky	1999	52 minutes
L'énigme des Nascas	Thierry Ragobert	1999	52 minutes
Les momies du peuple des nuages	Amy Bucher	1999	52 minutes
Les momies d'animaux	Serge Tignères, Alain Zenou	1999	13 minutes
Les cités perdues des Mayas	Jean-Claude Lubtchansky	2000	52 minutes
Champollion: A Scribe for Egypt	Jean-Claude Lubtchansky	2000	52 minutes
Les derniers jours de Zeugma	Thierry Ragobert	2000	52 minutes
L'Empire des nombres	Philippe Truffault	2001	53 minutes
Leonardo da Vinci: The Mind of the Renaissance	Jean-Claude Lubtchansky	2001	52 minutes
La Terre des Peaux-Rouges	Jean-Claude Lubtchansky	2001	52 minutes
Le voyage de Charlie	Stéphane Bégoin	2001	52 minutes
Angkor, la forêt de pierre	Jean-Claude Lubtchansky	2002	52 minutes
Darwin et la science de l'évolution	Valérie Winckler	2002	52 minutes
La mémoire perdue de l'île de Pâques	Thierry Ragobert	2002	52 minutes
Un corsaire sous la mer	Jérôme Julienne	2002	52 minutes
Les Étrusques : Un voyage interrompu	Bernard George	2002	52 minutes
Karakoum, la civilisation des oasis	Marc Jampolsky	2002	52 minutes
Une passion révélée : Edward Curtis, photographe	Anne Makepeace	2002	52 minutes
Le secret des Incas (orig. title: Secrets of the Incas)	David Malone	2002 (orig. rel. year: 2000)	52 minutes
Les Destins d'Alexandrie	Thierry Ragobert	2002	58 minutes
In Search of the Nile	Stéphane Bégoin	2003	52 minutes
The Mummies of Taklamakan	Olivier Horn	2003	52 minutes
Les momies du désert	Serge Tignères, Alain Zenou	2003	13 minutes
Sur la trace des Celtes	Marc Jampolsky	2003	52 minutes
Hammamet, au temps des Romains	Serge Viallet	2003	52 minutes
Lascaux, le ciel des premiers hommes	Stéphane Bégoin, Vincent Tardieu	2007	51 minutes
Les Rois Mages, sur les traces du mythe	Stéphane Bégoin	2008	52 minutes
Quand les Égyptiens naviguaient sur la Mer Rouge	Stéphane Bégoin	2009	93 minutes
1755, la Terre tremble à Lisbonne	Martin Papirovski, Heike Nelsen-Minkenberg	2009	52 minutes
Le mystère de l'oiseau blanc	Louis-Pascal Couvelaire	2010	52 minutes
À la poursuite du diamant bleu	Stéphane Bégoin, Thierry Piantanida	2011	52 minutes
Volcans d'Islande, et demain ?	Bertrand Loyer	2011	55 minutes
Honoré Fragonard, la passion de l'anatomie	Jacques Donjean, Olivier Horn	2011	52 minutes
Au bonheur des dames : L'invention du grand magasin	Sally Aitken, Christine Le Goff	2011	90 minutes
Au nom d'Athènes	Fabrice Hourlier	2011	2×52 minutes
Le Destin de Rome	Fabrice Hourlier	2011	2×52 minutes
David et la mort de Marat : Un peintre en Révolution	Martin Fraudreau	2011	52 minutes
Marie Curie, au-delà du mythe	Michel Vuillermet	2011	52 minutes
Nom de code : Poilus d'Alaska	Marc Jampolsky	2011	90 minutes
Vivement le cinéma	Jérôme Prieur	2011	52 minutes
Le mystère des momies coptes d'Antinoé	Jackie Bastide	2012	52 minutes
Les rois guerriers de Sibérie	Benoît Ségur	2012	52 minutes
La Ruée vers l'os	Jacques Mitsch	2012	52 minutes
Vauban : La sueur épargne le sang	Pascal Cuissot	2012	85 minutes
1783, le premier vol de l'homme	Stéphane Bégoin	2013	54 minutes
U455, le sous-marin disparu	Stéphane Bégoin	2013	52 minutes
The Bones of the Buddha	Steven Clarke	2013	52 minutes
Naachtun, la cité maya oubliée	Stéphane Bégoin	2016	90 minutes
Les aventures de Robert Fortune, ou comment le thé fut volé aux Chinois	Jérôme Scemla	2016	93 minutes
Van Gogh, l'énigme de l'oreille coupée	Jack MacInnes	2017	90 minutes
Tokyo, cataclysmes et renaissance	Olivier Julien	2017	90 minutes
Les paradis perdus d'Amazonie	Angus MacQueen	2017	83 minutes
Une ère nouvelle : La Renaissance (1^{re} partie)	Martin Papirowski	2017	55 minutes
Une ère nouvelle : La Renaissance (2^{e} partie)	Martin Papirowski	2017	55 minutes
Maximilien d'Autriche : Amour et pouvoir à la Renaissance	Manfred Corrine	2017	51 minutes
Un jour au Royaume-Uni	Roland Theron, Timothé Janssen	2017	90 minutes
Un âge de fer – La guerre de Trente Ans : Chaos (1618-1621)	Philippe Bérenger, Henrike Sandner	2018	52 minutes
Un âge de fer – La guerre de Trente Ans : Dieu (1626-1630)	Philippe Bérenger, Henrike Sandner	2018	52 minutes
Un âge de fer – La guerre de Trente Ans : Pouvoir (1630-1632)	Philippe Bérenger, Henrike Sandner	2018	52 minutes
Le labyrinthe secret de Namoroka	Jean-Michel Corillion	2018	90 minutes
