= Darwin and the Science of Evolution =

2000 book by Patrick Tort

- First French edition
- Author: Patrick Tort
- Original title: Darwin et la science de l'évolution
- Translator: Paul G. Bahn
- Language: French
- Series: Découvertes Gallimard●Sciences (FR); Abrams Discoveries (US); New Horizons (UK)
- Release number: 397th in collection
- Subject: Charles Darwin, Science of Evolution
- Genre: Illustrated biography, nonfiction monograph
- Publisher: Éditions Gallimard (FR); Harry N. Abrams (US); Thames & Hudson (UK)
- Publication date: 20 September 2000; 5 November 2020 (new ed.)
- Publication place: France
- English publication date: 2001
- Media type: Print (paperback)
- Pages: 160 pp.
- ISBN: 978-2-0705-3520-0 (first edition)
- OCLC: 1033636352
- Preceded by: Venise : La Sérénissime et la mer
- Followed by: La science-fiction, aux frontières de l'Homme

Darwin and the Science of Evolution (UK title: Charles Darwin: The Scholar Who Changed Human History; French: Darwin et la science de l'évolution) is a 2000 illustrated biography of Charles Darwin, and a monograph on his theory of evolution. Written by the French historian of science Patrick Tort, and published in pocket format by Éditions Gallimard as the 397th volume in their "Découvertes" collection (known as "Abrams Discoveries" in the United States, and "New Horizons" in the United Kingdom). The book was adapted into a documentary film of the same title in 2002.

== Introduction ==
From left: US and UK editions.

The book is part of the Sciences et techniques series (formerly belonging to Sciences series) in the "Découvertes Gallimard" collection. According to the tradition of "Découvertes", which is based on an abundant pictorial documentation and a way of bringing together visual documents and texts, enhanced by printing on coated paper, as commented in L'Express, "genuine monographs, published like art books". It's almost like a "graphic novel", replete with colour plates.

Here the author sheds light on the life and work of the main founder of the science of evolution. Part biography, part history of science and social documentary, this book takes readers on Darwin's journey of discovery.

== Reception ==
On Babelio, the book gets an average of 3.50/5 based on 6 ratings.

== Adaptation ==
In 2002, the book was adapted as a documentary film of the same name. A co-production between La Sept-Arte and Trans Europe Film, with the collaboration of Éditions Gallimard and CNRS Images Média, the film was directed by Valérie Winckler, with voice-over narration by the French actor Claude Aufaure and the director. It was broadcast on Arte as part of the television programme The Human Adventure, and dubbed into German under the title Charles Darwin und die Evolution. However, it is unclear whether the film is available in English.

== See also ==
- On the Origin of Species
