= Angkor: Heart of an Asian Empire =

1989 book by Bruno Dagens

- First French edition
- Author: Bruno Dagens
- Original title: Angkor : la forêt de pierre
- Translator: Ruth Sharman
- Cover artist: Philippe Munch (reprinted FR ed., UK & US eds.).
- Language: French
- Series: Découvertes Gallimard●Archéologie (FR); Abrams Discoveries (US); New Horizons (UK)
- Release number: 64th in collection
- Subject: Archaeology and rediscovery of Angkor Wat
- Genre: Nonfiction monograph
- Publisher: Éditions Gallimard (FR); Harry N. Abrams (US); Thames & Hudson (UK)
- Publication date: 10 November 1989
- Publication place: France
- English publication date: 1995
- Media type: Print (paperback)
- Pages: 192 pp.
- ISBN: 978-2-0705-3091-5 (first edition)
- OCLC: 936882962
- Preceded by: Quand les Gaulois étaient romains
- Followed by: Voltaire : La légende de saint Arouet

Angkor: Heart of an Asian Empire (French: Angkor : la forêt de pierre, lit. 'Angkor: The Stone Forest') is a 1989 illustrated monograph on the archaeology and rediscovery of Angkor Wat. Written by the French archaeologist and art historian, Bruno Dagens, and published in pocket format by Éditions Gallimard as the 64th volume in their "Découvertes" collection (known as "Abrams Discoveries" in the United States, and "New Horizons" in the United Kingdom). The book was adapted into a documentary film with the same title in 2002.

== Introduction ==
From left: US and UK editions. The covers featuring Angkor Thom Gate by French illustrator Philippe Munch, after an engraving by Louis Delaporte.

As part of the Archéologie series in the "Découvertes Gallimard" collection, Angkor : la forêt de pierre covers the rediscovery of Angkor Wat and the study of archaeological sites, objects, and documents found in the site, but not its history.

According to the tradition of "Découvertes", which is based on abundant pictorial documentation and a way of bringing together visual documents and texts, enhanced by printing on coated paper, as commented in L'Express, "genuine monographs, published like art books.

Here the author chronologically traces the whole history of the rediscovery of Angkor Wat—once the capital of the Khmer Empire—by people from all over the world, mainly European discoveries and explorations, for instance, Henri Mouhot, Doudart de Lagrée, Louis Delaporte, Francis Garnier, Henri Marchal, among others.

== Contents ==
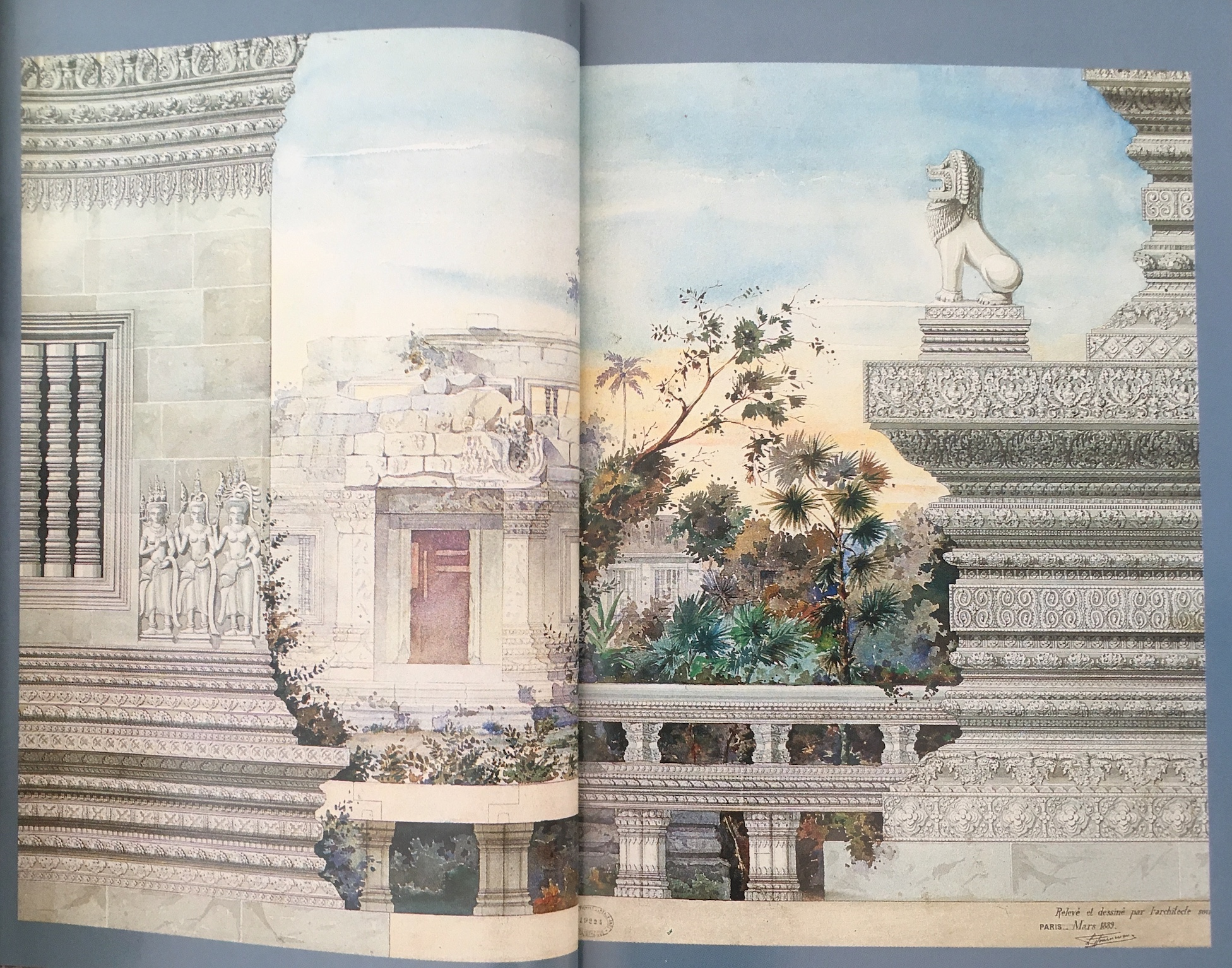
Lucien Fournereau, Angkor Wat (pp. 4–5). Ink and watercolour, March 1889. Bibliothèque de l'École nationale supérieure des Beaux-Arts, Paris.

The book opens with a "trailer" (pp. 1–9), that is, a series of full-page watercolors made by the 19th-century French archaeologist and explorer Lucien Fournereau. The body text is divided into six chapters:

- Chapter I: "Discovery? Is That the Word?" (pp. 13–29);
- Chapter II: "The 'Discoverer'" (pp. 31–43);
- Chapter III: "Exploration" (pp. 45–61);
- Chapter IV: "The Last of the Explorers" (pp. 63–81);
- Chapter V: "Angkor Reinstated" (pp. 83–113);
- Chapter VI: "Angkor, the Glory of a Nation" (pp. 115–127).

The second part of the book, the "Documents", contains a compilation of excerpts divided into five parts:

1. The Journey to Angkor (pp. 130–157);
2. Cosmic Symbolism (pp. 158–167);
3. Chronology (pp. 168–171);
4. Restoration and Anastylosis (pp. 172–177);
5. Tourists in Angkor (pp. 178–183).
- Further Reading (p. 184);
- List of Illustrations (pp. 185–188);
- Index (pp. 189–190).

== Adaptation ==
In 2002, the book was adapted into a documentary film of the same name. A co-production between La Sept-Arte and Trans Europe Film, with the collaboration of Éditions Gallimard, the film was directed by Jean-Claude Lubtchansky, with voice-over narration by French actors Serge Avédikian and Sylvie Moreau. It was broadcast on Arte as part of the television program The Human Adventure. and dubbed into German by the title Angkor: Werk des Königs der Engel. According to a Répertoire des films documentaires 2000/2003, the documentary is also available in English.^{:286} However, it is unclear whether the film is available with dubbing or subtitling.^{:40,}

== See also ==
- Khmer architecture
- Buddhism in Cambodia
- Hinduism in Cambodia
- In the "Découvertes Gallimard" collection:
  - Khmer: The Lost Empire of Cambodia by Thierry Zéphir
