= François Marthouret =

French actor

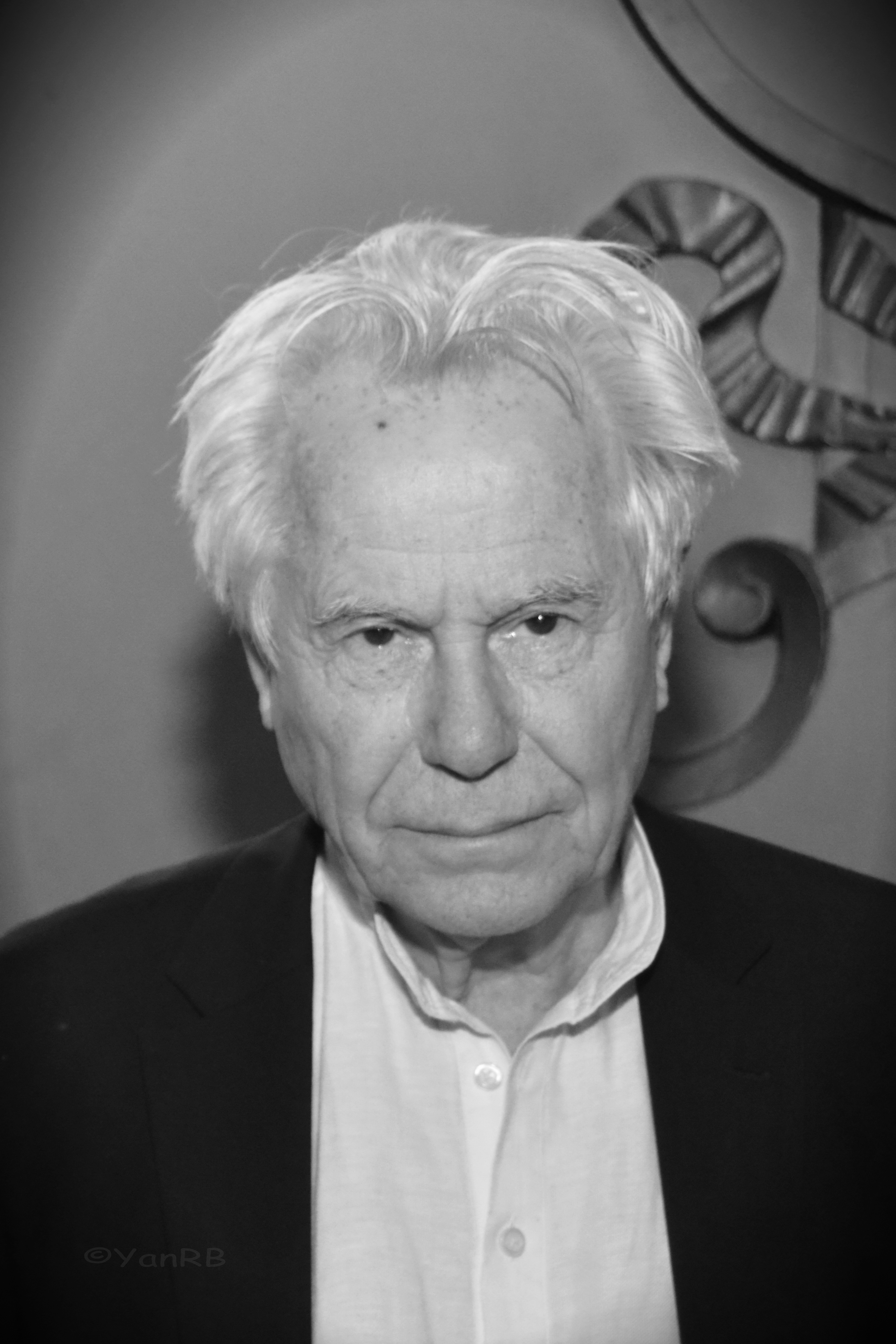
- Marthouret in 2019
- Born: 12 September 1943 (age 83); Paris, France
- Occupation: Actor
- Years active: 1967–present

François Marthouret (French: [fʁɑ̃swa maʁtuʁɛ]; born 12 September 1943) is a French actor.

He is best known for playing Paul Lescaut in the French police drama series Julie Lescaut.

== Selected filmography ==
Year	Title	Role	Director	Notes
1970	The Confession	A cop	Costa-Gavras	
1977	Bonheur, impair et passe	Wladimir	Roger Vadim	TV movie
1978	Dossier 51	Dominique Auphal	Michel Deville	
1989	Marquis	Marquis de Sade	Henri Xhonneux	
1989	La piovra, season 4	Senator Ernesto Conti	Luigi Perelli	TV mini-series
1991	Navarro	Carminatty	Josée Dayan	TV series (1 episode)
1993	Les Cinq Dernières Minutes	Xavier	Jean-Jacques Kahn	TV series (1 episode)
1993-2000	Julie Lescaut	Paul Lescaut	Josée Dayan, Élisabeth Rappeneau, ...	TV series (18 episodes)
1998	Sitcom	The father	François Ozon	
1998	Il était une fois la Mésopotamie	Voice-over	Jean-Claude Lubtchansky	Documentary film
1998	Quand le Japon s’ouvrit au monde	Voice-over	Jean-Claude Lubtchansky	Documentary film
1999	War in the Highlands	Josias Aviolat	Francis Reusser	
1999	Galilée, le messager des étoiles	Voice-over	Jean-Claude Lubtchansky	Documentary film
1999	Vers Tombouctou : L'Afrique des explorateurs	Voice-over	Jean-Claude Lubtchansky	Documentary film
2000	Les cités perdues des Mayas	Voice-over	Jean-Claude Lubtchansky	Documentary film
2001	The Lady and the Duke	Dumouriez	Éric Rohmer	
2002	La Terre des Peaux-Rouges	Voice-over	Jean-Claude Lubtchansky	Documentary film
2003	Monsieur N.	Narrator	Antoine de Caunes	
2005	Ripley Under Ground	Antoine Plisson	Roger Spottiswoode	
2005	Little Jerusalem	The Philosophy Professor	Karin Albou	
2007	The Murder of Princess Diana	Bertrand	John Strickland	TV movie
2008	Love Me No More	Paul	Jean Becker	
2010	Black Venus	Georges Cuvier	Abdellatif Kechiche	
2010	Streamfield, les carnets noirs	Abel Mocchi	Jean-Luc Miesch	
2014-2017	The law of ...	Various	Didier Le Pêcheur, Philippe Venault, ...	TV series (3 episodes)
2015	The Great Game	Gérard	Nicolas Pariser	
2019	By the Grace of God	Cardinal Barbarin	François Ozon	

== Theater ==
Year	Title	Author	Director	Notes
1967	L'Été	Romain Weingarten	Jean-François Adam	
1969	Un chantage au théâtre	Dacia Maraini	André Téchiné	
1970	The Tutor	Jakob Michael Reinhold Lenz	Antoine Vitez	
1970	The Seagull	Anton Chekhov	Antoine Vitez	
1974	Timon d'Athènes	William Shakespeare	Peter Brook	
1977	Ubu Roi	Alfred Jarry	Peter Brook	
1978	Measure for Measure	William Shakespeare	Peter Brook	
1980	The Tempest	William Shakespeare	François Marthouret	
1982	A Midsummer Night's Dream	William Shakespeare	Stuart Seide	
1983	Tea Party	Harold Pinter	François Marthouret	
1983	Des jours et des nuits	Harold Pinter	François Marthouret	
1984	Sommeil	Bruno Bayen	Jean-Louis Jacopin	
1985	Julius Caesar	William Shakespeare	Robert Hossein	
1985	Hamlet	William Shakespeare	François Marthouret & Hortense Guillemard	
1986	Venise sauvée	Hugo von Hofmannsthal	André Engel	
1987	In the Jungle of Cities	Bertolt Brecht	Georges Lavaudant	
1989	A Month in the Country	Ivan Turgenev	Bernard Murat	
1990	Récital René Char	René Char	René Farabet	
1991	Measure for Measure	William Shakespeare	Peter Zadek	
1991	La Musica deuxième	Marguerite Duras	Jean-Louis Martinelli	
1992	Le Livre des fuites	J. M. G. Le Clézio	François Marthouret	
1992	Récital René Char	René Char	René Farabet	
1993	Il Pilota Cieco	Giovanni Papini	Catherine Dewitte	
1994	Pour Roland Dubillard	Roland Dubillard	Pierre Dumayet	
1996	Gertrud	Hjalmar Söderberg	François Marthouret & Gérard Desarthe	Nominated - Molière Award for Best Supporting Actor
1997-1998	The Book of Disquiet	Fernando Pessoa	Alain Rais	
2000	No Exit	Jean-Paul Sartre	Robert Hossein	
2000	Fièvre	Anton Pashku	Ophélie Orecchia	
2002	The Father	August Strindberg	François Marthouret & Julie Brochen	
2002	Das Riesenrad	Václav Havel	Marcel Bozonnet	
2004	Traits d'union	Murielle Magellan	Bernard Murat	
2004	Oncle Paul	Austin Pendleton	Jean-Marie Besset & Gilbert Désveaux	
2006	Betrayal	Harold Pinter	Philippe Lanton	
2007	Faces	John Cassavetes	Daniel Benoin	
2007	Le Nouveau Testament	Sacha Guitry	Daniel Benoin	
2007	The Book of Disquiet	Fernando Pessoa	Alain Rais	
2008	Un couple idéal	Jean-Marie Besset	Jean-Luc Revol	
2009	Faces	John Cassavetes	Daniel Benoin	
2009	Le Nouveau Testament	Sacha Guitry	Daniel Benoin	
2009	Communistes et compagnons de route malakoffiots	Communist militants	Wajdi Mouawad	
2009	Satie en liberté	Karin Muller	Karin Muller	
2010	Le Collectionneur	Christine & Olivier Orban	Daniel Benoin	
2010	Le Solitaire	Eugène Ionesco	Jean-Louis Martinelli	
2012	Festen	Thomas Vinterberg & Mogens Rukov	Daniel Benoin	
2012-2013	Death of a Salesman	Arthur Miller	Claudia Stavisky	
2014	Seascape	Edward Albee	Jean-Marie Besset	
2016	Business is business	Octave Mirbeau	Claudia Stavisky	Nominated - Molière Award for Best Actor
2016	Le Souper	Jean-Claude Brisville	Daniel Benoin	
2017	Ça va ?	Jean-Claude Grumberg	Daniel Benoin	
