= Once Upon a Time in Mesopotamia =

1998 documentary film by Jean-Claude Lubtchansky

- DVD cover
- Also known as: Il était une fois la Mésopotamie : le pays entre les deux fleuves
- French: Il était une fois la Mésopotamie
- Genre: Documentary
- Based on: Il était une fois la Mésopotamie by: Jean Bottéro; Marie-Joseph Stève
- Written by: Jean Bottéro; Marie-Joseph Stève
- Screenplay by: Jean-Claude and Carole Lubtchansky
- Story by: Jean Bottéro; Marie-Joseph Stève
- Directed by: Jean-Claude Lubtchansky
- Voices of: François Marthouret; Corinne Jaber; Jean-Claude Lubtchansky
- Music by: Al Sur / Media 7; Le Chant du Monde; Djamchid Chemirani; Majid Kiani; Dariush Talai; Maison des cultures du monde; Ocora Radio France; Le Souffle d'or
- Country of origin: France
- Original language: French

Production
- Producer: Jean-Pierre Gibrat
- Cinematography: Mikaël Lubtchansky
- Editor: Jean-Claude Lubtchansky
- Running time: 52 minutes
- Production companies: Trans Europe Film; La Sept-Arte; Éditions Gallimard; Louvre Museum

Original release
- Network: Arte; La Cinquième
- Release: 30 May 1998

Once Upon a Time in Mesopotamia (French: Il était une fois la Mésopotamie; German: Es war einmal in Mesopotamien) is a 1998 French documentary film adapted from the nonfiction book of the same name by French Assyriologist Jean Bottéro and archaeologist Marie-Joseph Stève. Directed by Jean-Claude Lubtchansky who also co-wrote the screenplay, and co-produced by Trans Europe Film, La Sept-Arte, Éditions Gallimard, Louvre Museum and La Cinquième, with voice-over narration by French actors François Marthouret, Corinne Jaber and the director, the documentary is structured like an adventure film, taking viewers into the world of the first discoverers, epigraphists and Assyriologists who revealed Mesopotamian archaeology to the modern world.

The film was broadcast on Arte on 30 May 1998, as part of the channel's television programme The Human Adventure, and rebroadcast on La Cinquième on 4 and 5 June of the same year. In addition to German dubbing, the documentary has been subtitled into English and Spanish, and released on DVD by Centre national du cinéma et de l'image animée (CNC).

== Synopsis ==
Mesopotamia, the land between two rivers, whose brilliant civilisation began to develop 5000 years ago, apart from the reports of some ancient Greek and Roman chroniclers, it existed only as a biblical legend. It is the oldest and longest civilisation, both for the influence it exerted on the Near East and on the Greek world as for its contribution to the material and spiritual development of humanity, and oddly the most poorly known to the general public.

Today, however, many—albeit scattered—archaeological finds and various sites provide an impressive insight into the richness of this civilisation that invented writing and produced the first scientific systems and literary works. The artefacts kept in various European museums, the archaeological sites and the excavations themselves are documented on the basis of archive material, that is, photos, watercolours, drawings and films. Expedition reports and images of life in Mesopotamia before the first Iraq war illustrating the human adventure of reconstructing a lost civilisation.

== Production ==
The documentary was partially shot in Iraq, in the land of clay and reed between the Tigris and Euphrates rivers.

== The book ==
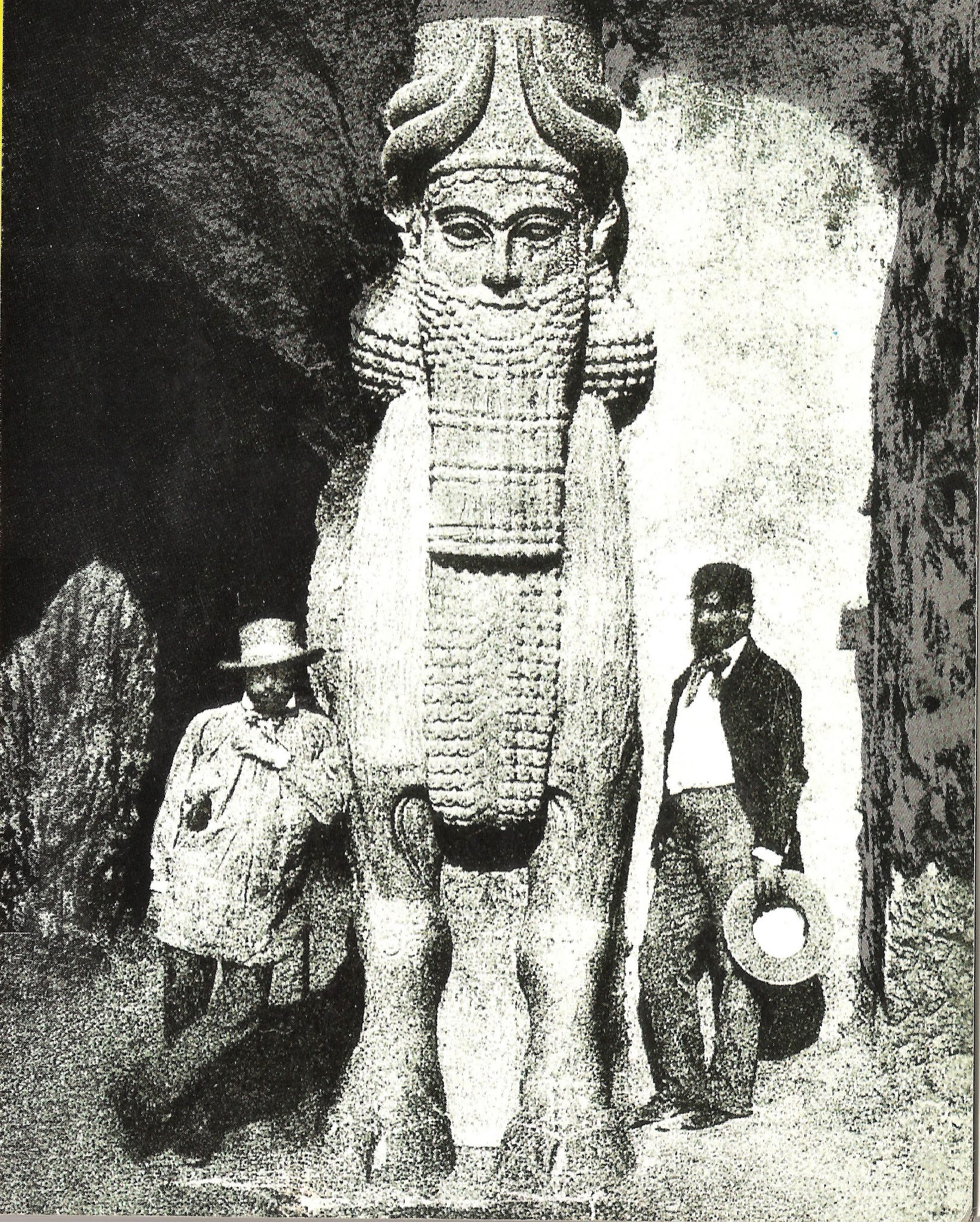
Victor Place and Gabriel Tranchand standing next to an Assyrian shedu at the gate of the palace of Sargon II, Dur-Sharrukin, Nineveh, 1852. Archaeological photograph reproduced on the cover.

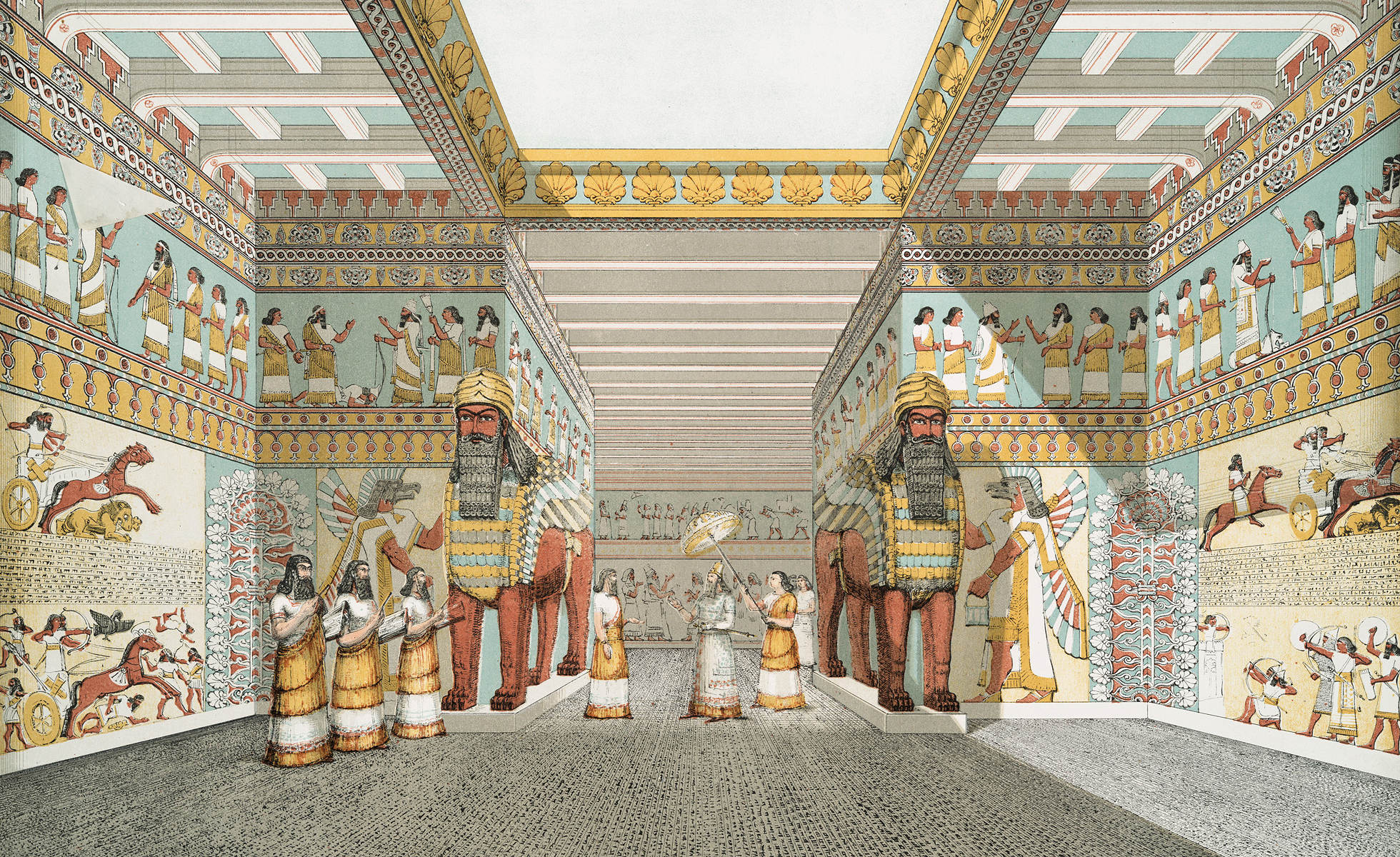
Artist's impression of a hall in an Assyrian palace, illustration from The Monuments of Nineveh: From Drawings Made on the Spot by Austen Henry Layard (1849), reproduced on the back cover.

The book Il était une fois la Mésopotamie, on which the film is based, is an illustrated monograph on Mesopotamian archaeology, published in pocket format by Éditions Gallimard on 4 November 1993. Co-written by French Assyriologist and biblicist Jean Bottéro, and his research companion, an archaeologist and Dominican friar Marie-Joseph Stève, the work is the 191st volume in the encyclopaedic collection 'Découvertes Gallimard', and part of the collection's Archéologie series. That is to say, here the subject is the rediscovery of Mesopotamian civilisation, the decipherment of cuneiform, and the study of archaeological sites, objects and documents discovered in the region, from the late eighteenth century onwards (history of Assyriology), but not the history of this civilisation.

According to the tradition of 'Découvertes', which is based on an abundant pictorial documentation and a way of bringing together visual documents and texts, enhanced by printing on coated paper; in other words, 'genuine monographs, published like art books'.

While many of the French titles from the collection make it into English, this book has never been translated.
