= Philippe Jacquin =

French anthropologist (1942–2002)

Philippe Jacquin (22 January 1942 – 28 September 2002) was a French anthropologist.

== Scientific literature ==
Jacquin published 20 books, including: American Indians, The Indian Policy of the United States (1830–1890), and The American people: origins, immigration, ethnicity. These are reference books on the history of Native Americans, including the blending of cultures and the initial conquest of the American West.

== Bibliography ==
- Histoire des Indiens d'Amérique du Nord, Payot, 1976
- Les Indiens blancs. Français et Indiens en Amérique du Nord, XVI^{e}-XVIII^{e} siècles, Payot, 1987
- La terre des Peaux-Rouges, coll. « Découvertes Gallimard » (nº 14), série Histoire. Éditions Gallimard, 1987
- Vers l'Ouest : Un nouveau monde, coll. « Découvertes Gallimard » (nº 25), série Histoire. Éditions Gallimard, 1987
- Sous le pavillon noir : Pirates et flibustiers, coll. « Découvertes Gallimard » (nº 45), série Histoire. Éditions Gallimard, 1988
- Terre indienne, Philippe Jacquin, Éd. Autrement, 1991
- Le Cow-boy. Un Américain entre le mythe et l'histoire, Éditions Albin Michel, 1992
- With Daniel Royot, Le mythe de l'Ouest : l'Ouest américain et les valeurs de la frontière, Éd. Autrement, 1993
- Les Indiens d'Amérique, Flammarion, 1996
- La politique indienne des États-Unis (1830–1890), Éd. Didier Erudition, 1996
- With Patrick Villiers & Pierre Ragon, Les Européens et la mer : de la découverte à la colonisation (1455–1860), Éd. Ellipses Marketing, 1997
- L'herbe des dieux. Le tabac dans les sociétés indiennes d'Amérique du Nord, Éd. Musee-Galerie De La Seita, 1997
- With Daniel Royot, La destinée manifeste des États-Unis au XIX^{e}, Éd. Ploton, 1999
- Le peuple américain : origines, immigration, ethnicité, identité, Seuil, 2000
- With Jean-Marie Michaud, Les Indiens, quelle histoire !, Casterman, 2001
- With Daniel Royot, Go West ! Histoire de l'Ouest américain d'hier à aujourd'hui, Flammarion, 2002
- La vie des pionniers au temps de la conquête de l'Ouest, Larousse, 2002
- Grandes civilisations : Afrique, Amérique, Asie, Europe, Océanie, Larousse, 2003 (under the direction of José Garanger)
- L'Europe des grands royaumes, Casterman, 2006
