= Jean-Claude Lubtchansky =

French documentary filmmaker (1930–2020)

- Born: 2 December 1930; Vincennes, France
- Died: 14 October 2020 (aged 89); Paris, France
- Occupations: Documentary and television director
- Relatives: William Lubtchansky (brother)

Jean-Claude Lubtchansky (2 December 1930 – 14 October 2020) was a French film editor, documentary and television director.

== Career ==
Best known as a documentary filmmaker, Jean-Claude Lubtchansky was the assistant director of two 1958 documentaries, Cités du soleil and Le grand œuvre : panorama de l'industrie française, and editor of the British film Lord of the Flies (1963). In 1976, he produced a documentary film about the Armenian mystic and philosopher George Gurdjieff, which was broadcast in 1978 on TF1. He directed two television films, Louis XI, un seul roi pour la France and Saint Louis ou La royauté bienfaisante, in 1980 and 1982, respectively. In 1996, he directed Les 13 Vies de Corto Maltese, a documentary that follows the anarchist sailor and defender of lost causes and his creator through some of his fascinating journeys. He was also known for making the majority of documentary adaptations of the monographic series "Découvertes Gallimard", three of which were co-produced with the Louvre Museum.

== Filmography ==
As director

- 1962: Ourane (short film)
- 1967: Ici, ailleurs ou dans le métro (short film)
- 1967: Dim Dam Dom (some episodes)
- 1967: One (Chroniques de France, nº 19)
- 1968: Pézenas, un village français (Chroniques de France, nº 30)
- 1970: Lumina, pièce pour douze cordes et bande magnétique d'Ivo Malec (episode of Les Grandes répétitions)
- 1973: La Rose rouge (episode of Ce que Paris chante)
- 1974: Hannah Arendt (episode of Un certain regard)
- 1979: Mes mains ont la parole (some episodes)
- 1980: Gandhi, apôtre de la non-violence (episode of Les Idées et les hommes)
- 1980: 1947 : La première crise de la IVº république
- 1980: Louis XI, un seul roi pour la France
- 1982: Saint Louis ou La royauté bienfaisante
- 1982: Le triange à quatre côtés (episode of De bien étranges affaires)
- 1991: The Watch on the Somme (episode of Harvests of Iron)
- 1995: Yukio Mishima (episode of Un siècle d'écrivains)
- 1995: Cher Père Noël
- 1996: Les 13 Vies de Corto Maltese
- 1997: La Porte enchantée
- 1998: Once Upon a Time in Mesopotamia
- 1998: Quand le Japon s’ouvrit au monde
- 1999: Galilée, le messager des étoiles
- 1999: On the Road to Timbuktu: Explorers in Africa
- 2000: Les Cités perdues des Mayas
- 2000: Champollion: A Scribe for Egypt
- 2001: Leonardo da Vinci: The Mind of the Renaissance
- 2002: La Terre des Peaux-Rouges
- 2002: Angkor : la forêt de pierre

As assistant director

- 1958: Cités du soleil
- 1958: Le grand œuvre : panorama de l'industrie française

As editor

- 1962: Le Thé à la menthe
- 1963: Lord of the Flies
- 1964: Nuit noire, Calcutta
- 1964: 4 fois D
- 1978: The Last Campaign

As producer

- 1978: Georges Gurdjieff
- 1979: Meetings with Remarkable Men (production associate)
