= Louis de Mas Latrie =

French historian

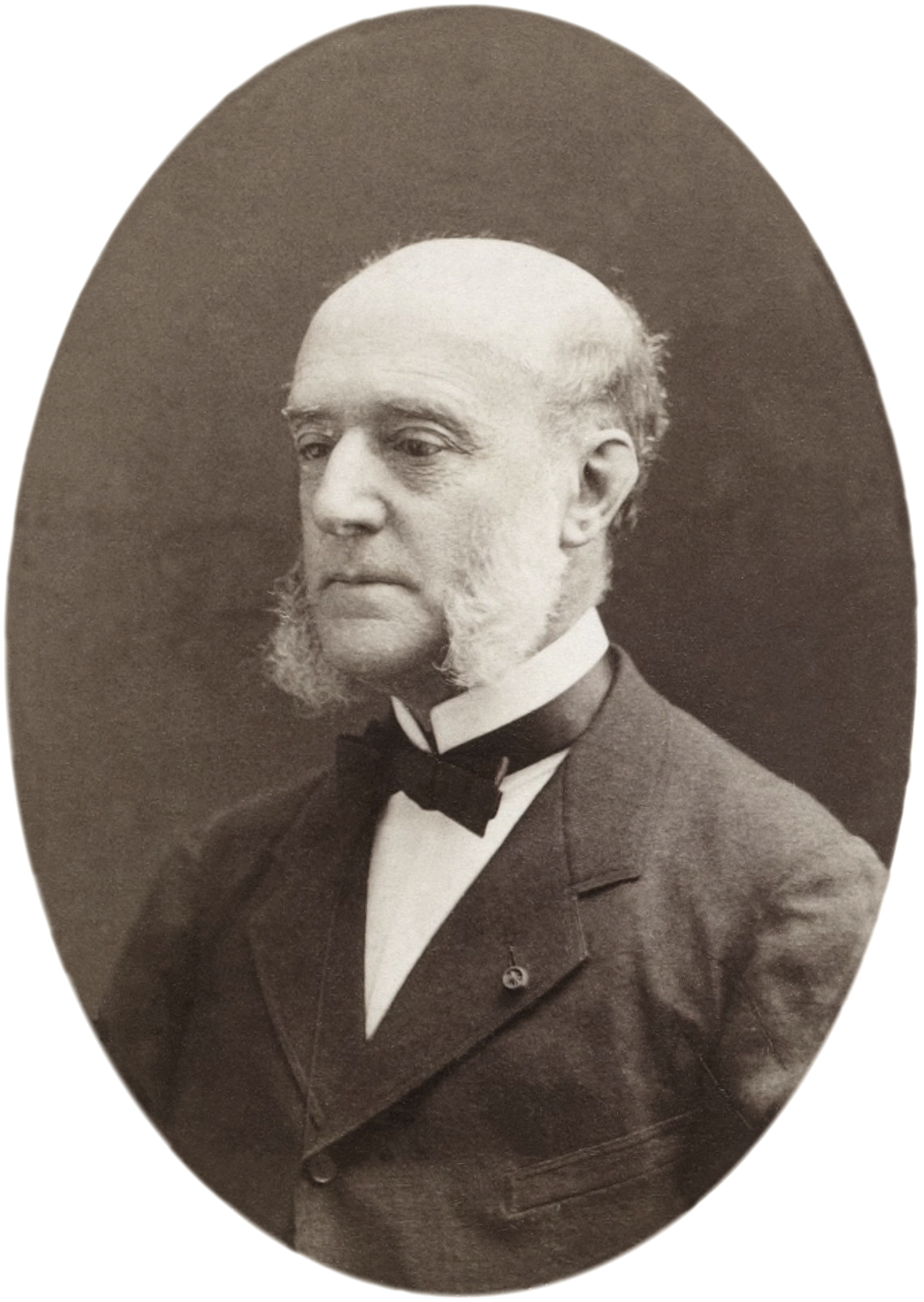
- Born: Jacques Marie Joseph Louis de Mas Latrie; Castelnaudary
- Died: 3 January 1897 (aged 81); Paris
- Occupation: Historian
- Spouse: Pauline Rendu

Louis de Mas Latrie (9 April 1815 – 3 January 1897) was a 19th-century French historian.

== Biography ==
After his studies at the École nationale des chartes, Louis de Mas Latrie became an historian and specialized on Cyprus during the Middle Ages. He made several voyages there and is now considered by his peers as the founder of history and archaeology of the island.

In 1848, he succeeded Jacques-Joseph Champollion as professor of diplomatics at the École de Chartes and held that position until his retirement in 1885. He then chose Arthur Giry who had been his assistant for two years to replace him.

He was elected a member of the Académie des Inscriptions et Belles-Lettres in 1885. He was also a member of the Comité des travaux historiques et scientifiques and of the Société de l’histoire de France. His works won numerous awards, including a prize bt the Academy des Inscriptions in 1843, a medal in the competition of National Antiquities in 1850 and first and second Grand prix Gobert in 1862 and 1878.

In 1841, he married Pauline Rendu, the niece of Ambroise Rendu, with whom he had 4 children. Widowed in 1862, he remarried three years later with Julie Anne Chauvet, widow of a cousin of his wife, a former lawyer to the Conseil d'État and the Court de Cassation. In 1875, Pope Pius IX granted Louis Mas Latrie the title of count, transmissible to his male offspring. His eldest son, René de Mas Latrie (1844–1904), a former student of the École des Chartes, published in 1875 a study entitled Du droit de marque ou droit de représailles au Moyen Age. One of the granddaughters of Louis Mas Latrie, Anne (1878–1946), married the royalist polemicist Roger Lambelin.

== Principal works ==
- 1840: Notice historique sur la paroisse de St Etienne-du-Mont, ses monuments et établissements anciens et modernes, suivie des offices propres à l'usage de la même paroisse
- 1840: Chronologie historique des papes, des conciles généraux et des conciles des Gaules et de France...
- Mas-Latrie Louis de. (1844). Notice sur les monnaies et les sceaux des rois de Chypre de la maison de Lusignan. Bibliothèque de l'école des chartes. Tome 5, 118-142.
- 1852–1861: Histoire de l'île de Chypre sous le règne des princes de la maison de Lusignan
- 1853: Dictionnaire des manuscrits ou Recueil de catalogues de manuscrits existants dans les principales bibliothèques d'Europe concernant plus particulièrement les matières ecclésiastiques et historiques
- 1854: Dictionnaire de paléographie, de cryptographie, de dactylologie, d'hiéroglyphie, de sténographie et de télégraphie
- De Mas-Latrie Louis. (1856). Fragments d'histoire de Chypre. Établissement de la domination latine en Chypre. Bibliothèque de l'école des chartes. Tome 17. 305-340.
- De Mas-Latrie Louis. (1856). Fragments d'histoire de Chypre. Établissement de la domination latine en Chypre. Bibliothèque de l'école des chartes. Tome 17. 10-53.
- De Mas-Latrie Louis. (1860). Fragment d'histoire de Chypre. Premiers temps du règne d'Amaury de Lusignan. Bibliothèque de l'école des chartes. Tome 21. 339-369.
- 1862: Fac-simile des miniatures contenues dans le bréviaire Grimani conservé à la bibliothèque de St Marc, exécuté en photographie par Antoine Perini, avec explications de François Zanotto et un texte français de M. Louis de Mas Latrie
- De Mas-Latrie Louis. (1863). Notice sur la construction d'une carte de l'île de Chypre. Bibliothèque de l'école des chartes. Tome 24. 1-50.
- 1865: Traités de paix et de commerce et documents divers concernant les relations des chrétiens avec les Arabes de l'Afrique septentrionale au moyen âge : recueillis par ordre de l'empereur et publiés avec une introduction historique
- Mas-Latrie Louis de. (1871). Nouvelles preuves de l'Histoire de Chypre [premier article]. Bibliothèque de l'école des chartes. Tome 32. 341-378.
- De Mas-Latrie Louis. (1873). Nouvelles preuves de l'Histoire de Chypre [deuxième article]. Bibliothèque de l'école des chartes. Tome 34. 47-87.
- 1878: De quelques seigneuries de Terre-Sainte
- 1879: Les Comtes de Jaffa et d'Ascalon du XIIe au XIXe siècle
- 1880: Les Comtes du Carpas
- 1888: Les Rois de Serbie
- 1894: Les Seigneurs d'Arsur en Terre Sainte
