= Maurice Prou =

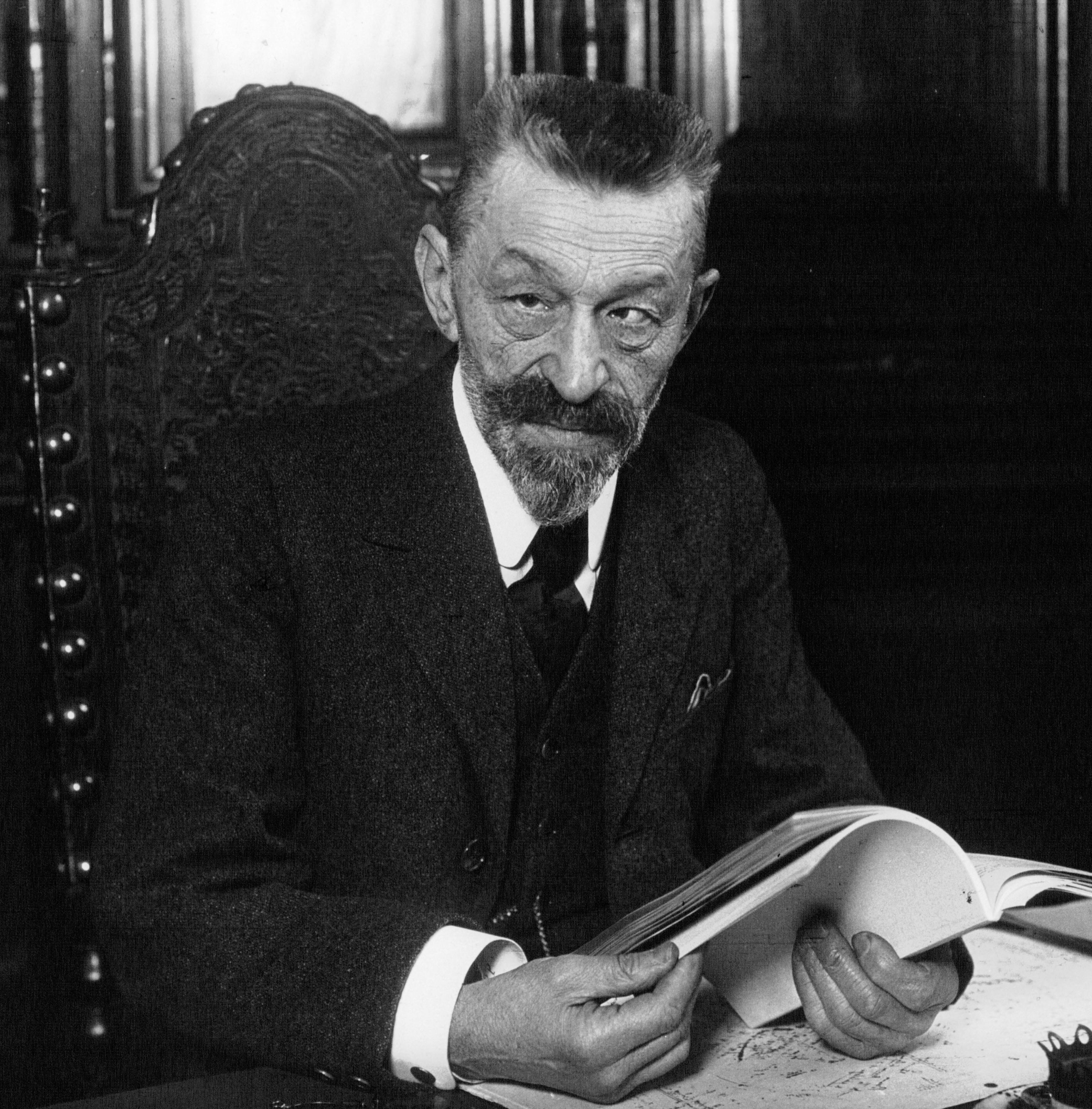
Maurice Prou, 1925

Maurice Prou (28 December 1861, Sens – 4 October 1930, Néris-les-Bains) was a French archivist, paleographer and numismatist.

== Biography ==
He studied at the École des Chartes and the École française de Rome. He went on to work at the Cabinet des médailles de la Bibliothèque nationale de France. In 1899, following the death of Arthur Giry (1848–1899), he was appointed professor of diplomatics at the École des Chartes. In 1916, he became the school's director, a position he maintained until 1930. Within this time period (1916–1919), he also taught classes on histoire des institutions, filling in for Paul Viollet (1840–1914).

Prou played a major role in the revival of history of law and its institutions during the latter part of the 19th century. He was a longtime member of the editorial board of Revue historique de droit ("Historical Review of Law") and the Société d’histoire du droit (Society of Legal History). He was also a member of the Académie des Inscriptions et Belles-Lettres (from 1910), the Société archéologique de Sens and the Société française de numismatique.

== Works ==
Among his many publications are editions of Hincmar (De ordine palatii, 1884) and Rodulfus Glaber (Les cinq livres de ses histoires, 1886). The following are a few of his other principal writings:

- Étude sur les relations politiques du pape Urbain V avec les rois de France, Jean II et Charles V (1362-1370), 1887 -- Study on the political relations of Pope Urban V with the kings of France, Jean II and Charles V (1362-1370).
- Manuel de paléographie latine et française du VIe au XVIIe siécle, suivi d'un dictionnaire des abréviations avec 23 facsimilés en phototypie, 1890 -- Textbook of French and Latin palaeography (the sixth to the seventeenth century), etc.
- Les monnaies carolingiennes, Catalogue des monnaies françaises de la Bibliothèque nationale, (1896) -- The Carolingian mint.
- La Gaule mérovingienne, 1897 -- Merovingian Gaul.

== Sources ==
- France savante (biographical information, includes extensive list of Prou's publications.)
- Parts of this article are based on a translation of an equivalent article at the French Wikipedia.
