= Teulet =

Teulet is a French surname. Notable people with the surname include:

- Alexandre Teulet (1807–1866), French Palaeographer, archivist, and historian
- Romain Teulet (born 1978), French rugby union player

== See also ==
- Mouzieys-Teulet, a French commune
