= Michelle Bubenicek =

French medievalist historian

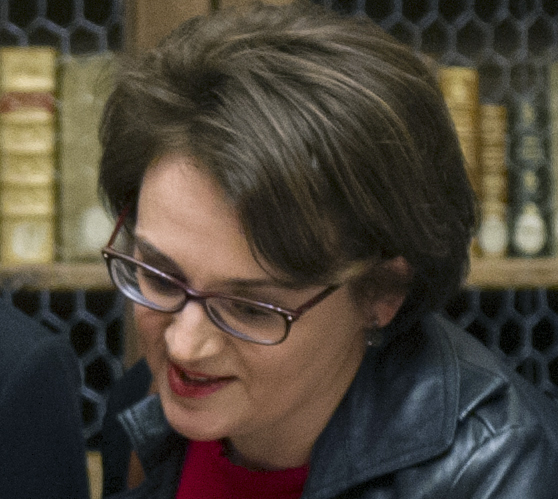
Michelle Bubenicek in 2017

Michelle Bubenicek (born 9 January 1971, in Nantes) is a French medievalist historian. She was appointed director of the École Nationale des Chartes on 1 September 2016.

== Works ==
=== Books ===
- 2002: Quand les femmes gouvernent, droit et politique au XIV: Yolande de Flandre. Mémoires et documents de l'École des chartes. Paris: École des chartes. 2002. ISBN 2-900791-49-9.
- 2013: Entre rébellion et obéissance: l'espace politique comtois face au duc Philippe le Hardi (1384-1404). Rayon histoire de la librairie Droz. Genève: Droz. 2013. ISBN 978-2-600016-01-8.
- 2014: Meurtre au donjon: l'affaire Huguette de Sainte-Croix. Paris: Presses universitaires de France. 2014. ISBN 978-2-13-061788-4.
- 2016: L'Ambition et l'Énergie: Philippe le Hardi, premier duc Valois de Bourgogne (1384-1404). Biographies. Paris: Belin.
- 2016: Doléances: approches comparées de la plainte politique comme voie de régulation dynamique des rapports gouvernants-gouvernés (fin XIIIe-premier XIXe s.). Besançon: Cahiers de la MSHE Ledoux.

=== Pamphlet ===
- 1996: Michelle Bubenicek; Louis Cosnier; Solange Lassalle; Odile Welfelé-Capy. Guide de l'archivage au siège du CNRS. Paris: Centre national de la recherche scientifique. ISBN 2-91098605-5.

== Awards ==
- Prix Madeleine-Lenoir 2002 de la Société de l'École des chartes pour Quand les femmes gouvernent, droit et politique au XIV.

Preceded by Jean-Michel Leniaud	Director of the École Nationale des Chartes; 2016–	Succeeded by –
