= Alain Tallon =

French historian (born 1967)

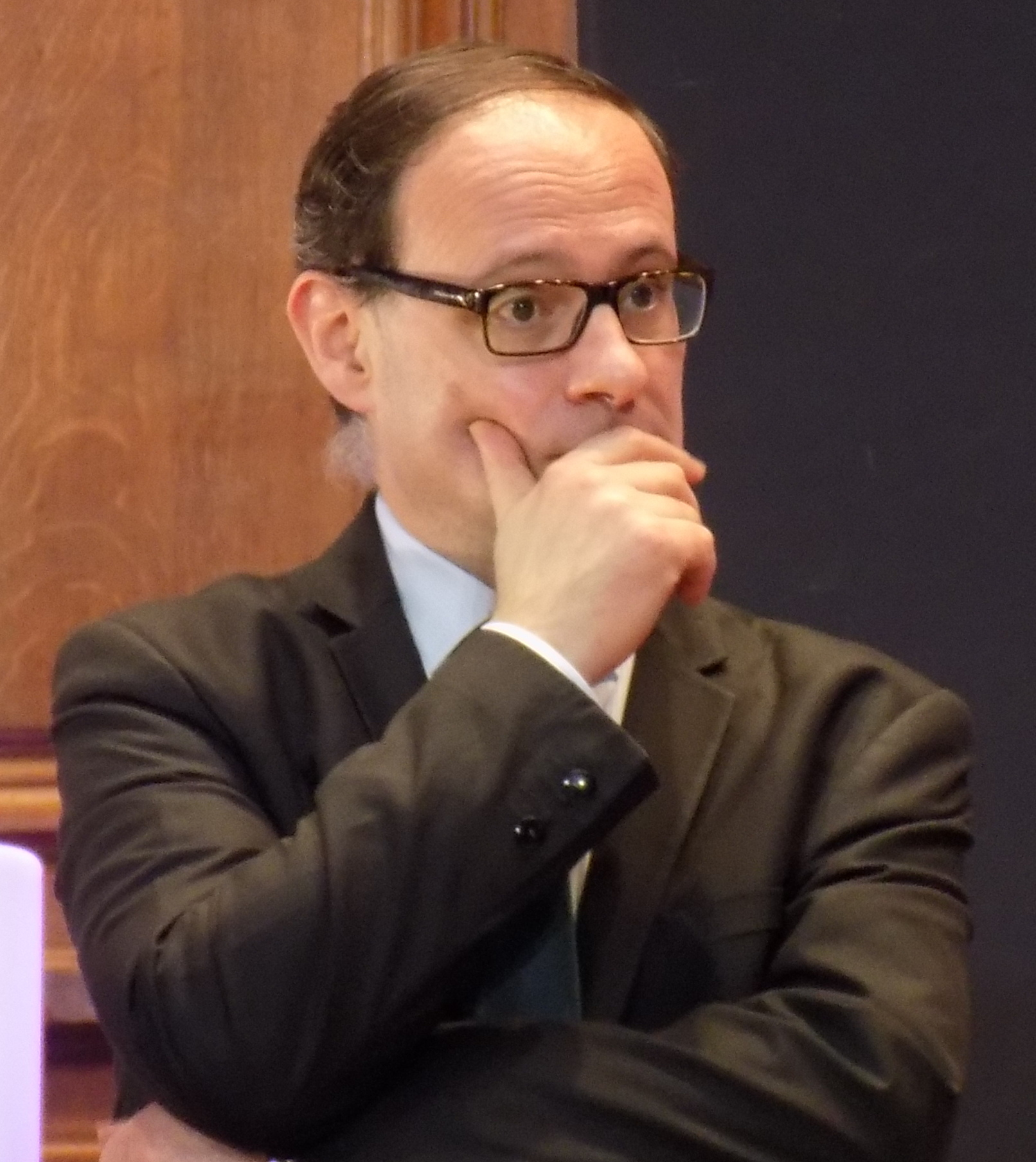
Alain Tallon in 2015

Alain Tallon (14 November 1967) is a French modernist historian, specialist of religious history.

== Principal works ==
- .La Compagnie du Saint-Sacrement (1629–1667). Spiritualité et société - Cerf, Paris - 1990 - ISBN 978-2-204-04031-0.
- .La France et le concile de Trente (1518–1563) - Bibliothèque des Écoles française d’Athènes et de Rome, Rome - 1997 - ISBN 978-2-7283-0386-1.
- Le concile de Trente - Cerf, coll. « Petite histoire » - Paris - 2000 ISBN 2-204-06431-9.
- Conscience nationale et sentiment religieux en France au XVIe. Essai sur la vision gallicane du monde - Presses universitaires de France, Paris - 2002 - ISBN 978-2-13-051541-8.
- Charles Quint face aux Réformes (with Guy Le Thiec), actes du colloque international organisé par le Centre d'histoire des Réformes et du protestantisme (11e colloque Jean Boisset), Montpellier, 8–9 juin 2001, Honoré Champion, Paris - 2005 ISBN 978-2-7453-1204-4.
- Pouvoirs, contestations et comportements dans l'Europe moderne : mélanges en l'honneur du professeur Yves-Marie Bercé, dir. Bernard Barbiche, Jean-Pierre Poussou et Alain Tallon - Paris : PUPS (Presses de l'Université Paris-Sorbonne) - 2005 - ISBN 978-2-84050-400-9.
- L'Europe de la Renaissance - Paris : Presses universitaires de France - 2006 - (Que sais-je ?, 3767) - ISBN 978-2-13-055745-6.
- Le sentiment national dans l'Europe méridionale aux XVIe et XVIIe siècles, France, Espagne, Italie (actes du colloque international, 27 and 28 September 2004, Madrid, organisé par la Casa de Velázquez) - éd. Alain Tallon, Madrid : Casa de Velázquez - 2007 - ISBN 978-84-95555-93-9.
- La Réforme en France et en Italie : contacts, comparaisons et contrastes (actes du colloque international de Rome, 27–29 October 2005) - éd. Philip Benedict, Silvana Seidel Menchi et Alain Tallon - Rome : École française de Rome - 2007 - ISBN 978-2-7283-0790-6.
- L' Europe au XVIe siècle. États et relations internationales - Paris : Presses universitaires de France - 2010 - (Nouvelle Clio) - ISBN 978-2-13-053049-7.
