= Jean-Michel Leniaud =

French historian of art (born 1951)

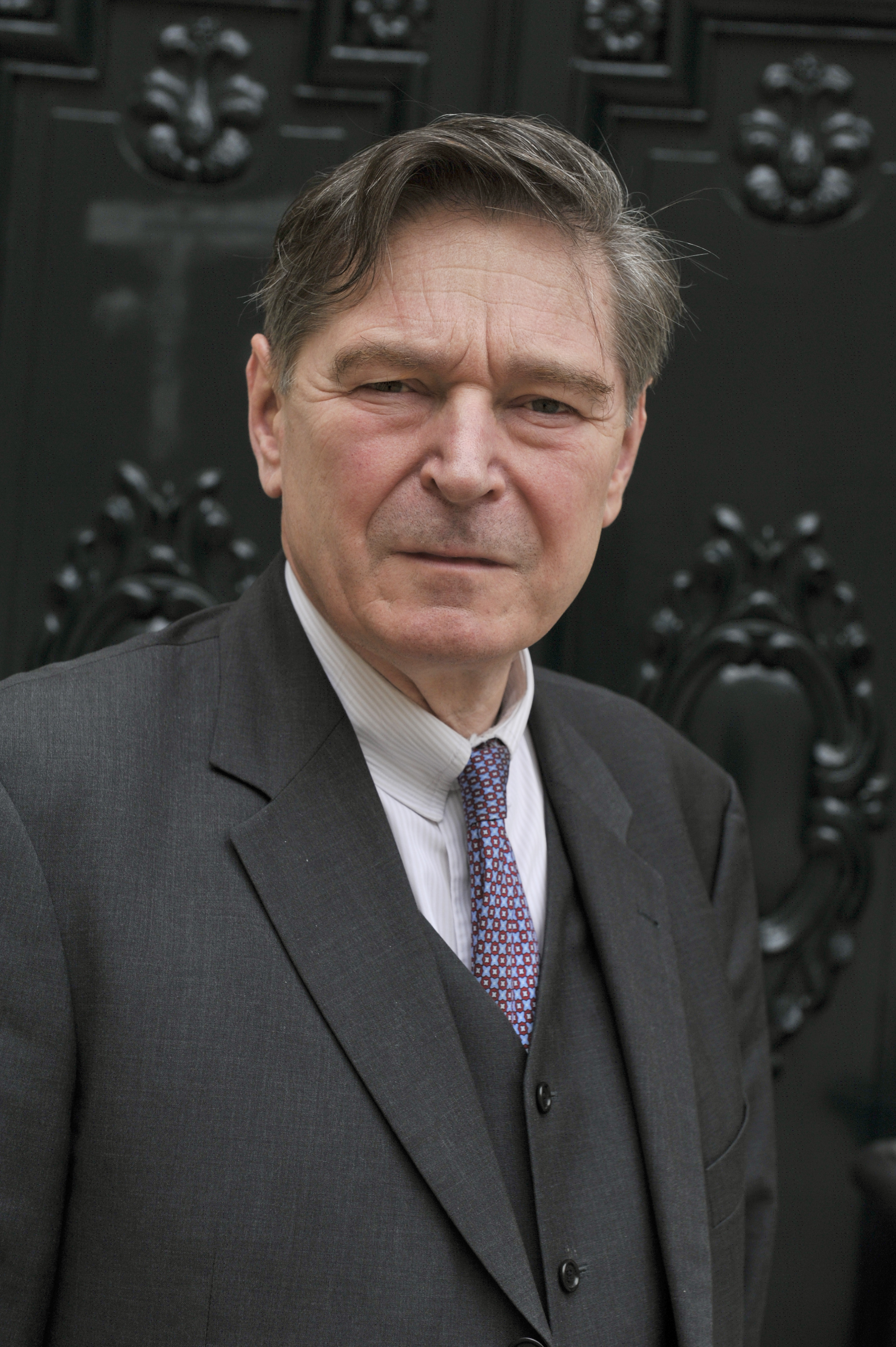
Jean-Michel Leniaud in 2014

Jean-Michel Leniaud (born 18 August 1951 in Toulon) is a French historian of art. A specialist of architecture and art of the 19th and 20th centuries, he was director of the École Nationale des Chartes from 2011 to 2016. He is president of the Société des Amis de Notre-Dame de Paris.

== Publications ==
- 1980: Jean-Baptiste Lassus, 1807-1857 ou Le Temps retrouvé des cathédrales, Arts et métiers graphiques, (thesis for the archivist palaeographer diploma) BnF 34654184
- 1988: L'Administration des cultes pendant la période concordataire, Nouvelles éditions latines, 1988 BnF 35086607
- 1989: Introduction aux Mémoires de l'abbé Grégoire, Santé, BnF 35047623
- 1989: La Culture des sans-culottes, Paris-Presses du Languedoc, (with Bernard Deloche) BnF 34313795
- 1991: La Sainte-Chapelle, Nathan-Caisse nationale des monuments historiques et des sites, (with Françoise Perrot) BnF 35537624
- 1992: L'Utopie française : essai sur le patrimoine, Mengès, (pref. Marc Fumaroli) BnF 36955788
- 1993: Les Cathédrales au XIXe : étude du service des édifices diocésains, Economica-Caisse nationale des monuments historiques et des sites, BnF 35593319
- 1993 Ces églises du XIXe, Encrage, 1993 (avec Chantal Bouchon, Catherine Brisac et Nadine Chaline) BnF 35576717
- 1994: Répertoire des architectes diocésains du XIXe, Economica,(Read online)
- 1994: Viollet-le-Duc ou Les Délires du système, Mengès, BnF 36681221
- 1996: Saint-Denis, de 1760 à nos jours, Gallimard-Julliard, BnF 35803852
- 1998: Les Bâtisseurs d'avenir : portraits d'architectes : : XIXe-XXe siècle : Fontaine, Viollet-le-Duc, Hankar, Horta, Guimard, Tony Garnier, Le Corbusier, Fayard BnF 37027858
- 2001: L'Hôtel de la préfecture et du conseil général des Yvelines, Versailles, Association pour le patrimoine d'Île-de-France (with Nicole de Blic, ill. Daniel Balloud) BnF 38905115
- 2001: Chroniques patrimoniales, Norma, BnF 37690815
- 2001: Les Périodiques d'architecture, XVIIIe-XIXe siècle : recherche d'une méthode critique d'analyse, École des chartes, 2001 (dir. avec Béatrice Bouvier) ISBN 2-900791-42-1 BnF 37640970
- 2001 Le Livre d'architecture : XVe-XXe siècle : édition, représentations et bibliothèques, École des chartes, (dir. with Béatrice Bouvier) ISBN 2-900791-53-7 BnF 38889236
- 2002: Des palais pour les livres : Labrouste, Sainte-Geneviève et les bibliothèque, Maisonneuve et Larose-bibliothèque Sainte-Geneviève, dir. (av.-propos Nathalie Jullian) BnF 38953308
- 2002: Fallait-il achever Saint-Ouen de Rouen ? : débats et polémiques, 1837-1852, ASI, BnF 38880293
- 2002: Les Archipels du passé : le patrimoine et son histoire, Fayard, ISBN 9782213611679 BnF 38847723
- 2003: Architecture, institutions et services publics, École pratique des hautes études ed.
- 2003: Charles Garnier, Monum-Le Patrimoine, (ill. Thierry Béghin) BnF 39059943
- 2004: Les Rivieras de Charles Garnier et Gustave Eiffel : le rêve de la raison, Imbernon, (en coll.) BnF 39298081
- 2005: Entre nostalgie et utopie : réalités architecturales et artistiques aux XIXe et XXe, École des chartes, (dir.) BnF 40149957
- 2005: Historiographie de l’histoire de l’art religieux en France à l’époque moderne et contemporaine : bilan bibliographique (1975-2000) et perspectives, (dir. with Isabelle Saint-Martin) BnF 40063614
- 2005: Le Palais de l'Institut : du collège des Quatre-Nations à l'Institut de France : 1895-2005, Éditions Nicolas Chaudun, (en coll.) BnF 40042331
- 2006: Notre-Dame de Chartres, Molière, 2006 BnF 40972773
- 2007: La Révolution des signes : l'art à l'église, 1830-1930, Le Cerf, BnF 40968246
- 2007: Vingt siècles d'architecture religieuse en France, SCEREN-CNDP,
- 2007: La Sainte-Chapelle, Le Patrimoine-Centre des monuments nationaux, (with Françoise Perrot) BnF 41108769 (also published in English)
- 2007: Le Budget des cultes, École des chartes, (dir.) BnF 41083784
- 2008: Notre-Dame de Paris, Molière, BnF 41407563
- 2009: L’Art nouveau, Citadelles et Mazenod, ISBN 9782850884436 BnF 42060716 (translated into German and Russian)
- 2010: with Bénédicte Savoy (2010). 5, Pariser Platz à Berlin;une ambassade de légende. Résidences de France. Paris: Éditions internationales du patrimoine. ISBN 978-2-9534330-2-9. (also published in German)
- 2012: La Basilique royale de Saint-Denis : de Napoléon à la République, Picard, Paris, ISBN 978-2-7084-0919-4 BnF 42668726
- 2012: La Basilique Saint-Denis, Le Patrimoine-Centre des monuments nationaux, Paris, (with Philippe Plagnieux) ISBN 978-2-7577-0184-3 BnF 42620885
- 2012: Napoléon et les Arts, Citadelles et Mazenod, Paris, ISBN 978-2850885358 BnF 42748877
- 2013: Droit de cité pour le patrimoine, Presses de l'université du Québec, Montréal, 303 p. ISBN 978-2760537545
- 2014: Viollet-le-Duc : les visions d'un architecte (dir. avec Laurence de Finance), Norma, ISBN 978-2-915-54266-0 BnF 44247011
- 2015: La Transmission familiale de l'esprit de service (dir. avec Pierre Jaillard et Éric Peuchot), Paris, Tallandier, 183 p. ISBN 979-10-210-1538-8 BnF 44352088
- 2015: Les Fastes de la trompe (dir. with Jean-Pierre Chaline), Paris, Tallandier, 191 p. ISBN 979-10-210-1049-9 BnF 44469351

== Honours ==
=== Decorations ===
- Officier de la Légion d'honneur
- Officier de l'ordre national du Mérite
- Commandeur of the Ordre des Palmes académiques
- Commandeur of the Ordre des Arts et des Lettres

=== Prizes ===
- Prix Chaix-d'Est-Ange de l'Académie des sciences morales et politiques et prix d'histoire de l'architecture de l'ordre des architectes d'Île-de-France pour Les Cathédrales au XIXe (1993)
- Médailles d'argent du prix Eugène-Carrière de l'Académie française for Les Bâtisseurs d'avenir (1998) and Charles Garnier (2003)
- Prix Bernier de l’Académie des beaux-arts for Les Rivieras de Charles Garnier et Gustave Eiffel (2007)
- Prix Houllevigue de l'Académie des beaux-arts for L'Art nouveau (2009)

Preceded by Jacques Berlioz	Director of the École Nationale des Chartes; 2011–2016	Succeeded by Michelle Bubenicek
