= Suzanne Dobelmann =

French librarian

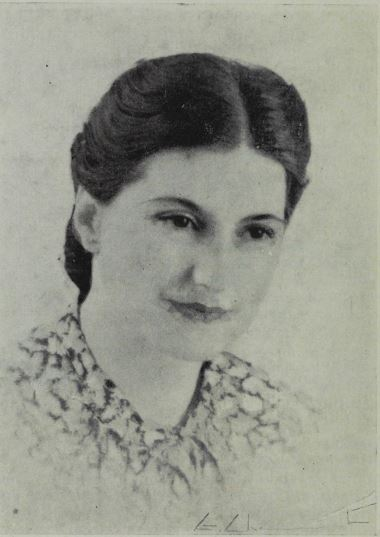
- Born: May 3, 1905
- Died: 6 November 1993 (aged 88)
- Known for: Work as librarian and curator

Suzanne Dobelmann (3 May 1905 – 11 June 1993) was a French librarian, researcher, and recipient of the Ordre des Palmes Académiques and Ordre National du Merite among other awards. Dobelmann received her Bachelor's and master's degree (in 1930) from the École des chartes. Her thesis, "The Language of Cahors from the Beginning of the Thirteenth Century to the end of the Sixteenth Century" was subsequently published in 1944. Dobelmann was the head librarian of the municipal library of Toulouse from 1937 to 1949. In 1949 she became a curator at the University of Grenoble's library and was named its head curator in 1967. In 1940 Dobelmann established a children's library in Toulouse, L'Heure joyeuse, using the model developed in Paris.
