= Yves-Marie Bercé =

French historian (1936–2026)

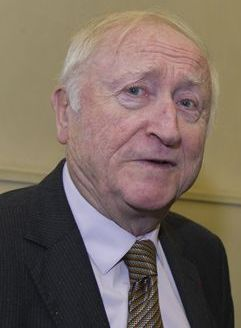
Bercé in 2015

Yves-Marie Bercé (30 August 1936 – 30 June 2026) was a French historian known for his work on popular revolts of the modern era. He was a member of the Institut de France.

== Life and career ==
A student at the École Nationale des Chartes and former resident at the École française de Rome, Yves-Marie Bercé defended in 1972 a doctoral thesis on the popular uprisings in the southwest of France in the seventeenth century. He is the author of Croquants et Nu-pieds published in 1974.

In this book he developed the strong antagonism between "good cities" and the "low country", namely between the bourgeois and the peasant world in France from the sixteenth to the nineteenth.

In 1998, all of his work was distinguished by the Madeleine Laurain-Portemer prize. He was elected a member of the Académie des Inscriptions et Belles-Lettres on 30 November 2007 at the seat left vacant by Pierre Amandry.

Bercé died on 30 June 2026, at the age of 89.

== Publications ==
- 1963: Troubles frumentaires et pouvoir centralisateur : l’émeute de Fermo dans les Marches (1648), abstract from the Mélanges d’archéologie et d’histoire published by the École française de Rome, année 1962 – 2, II, 782.
- 1974: Croquants et Nu-pieds : les soulèvements paysans en France du XVII au XIXe, Gallimard (coll. Archives), Julliard.
- 1976: Histoire des Croquants : étude des soulèvements populaires au XVIIe dans le Sud-Ouest de la France, Droz (coll. Mémoires et documents publiés par la Société de l'École des chartes), Genève/Paris, 1974. Grand prix Gobert of the Académie Française.
- 1976: Fête et révolte : des mentalités populaires du XVIe au XVIIIe, Hachette (coll. Le Temps et les hommes).
- 1978: La Vie quotidienne dans l'Aquitaine du XVIIIe, Hachette (coll. La Vie quotidienne).
- 1980: Révoltes et révolutions dans l'Europe moderne, Presses universitaires de France (coll. L'Historien).
- 1984: Le Chaudron et la lancette : croyances populaires et médecine préventive, 1798-1830, Presses de la Renaissance (coll. Histoire des hommes).
- 1984: Le XVIIe: de la Contre-Réforme aux Lumières, Hachette (coll. Collection Hachette université. Initiation à l'histoire).
- 1990: Le Roi caché. Sauveurs et imposteurs. Mythes politiques populaires dans l'Europe moderne, Nouvelles études historiques (coll. Nouvelles études historiques).
- 1992: La Naissance dramatique de l'absolutisme, Le Seuil (coll. Points Histoire).
- 1996: Complots et conjurations dans l'Europe moderne. Actes du colloque de Rome (30 September – 2 October 1993), École française de Rome, 1.
- 2000: Les Monarchies espagnole et française du milieu du XVIe à 171, collectif, CNED, Poitiers et SEDES, Paris (coll. CNED-SEDES concours).
- 2004: À la découverte des trésors cachés : du XVIe à nos jours, Perrin (coll. Pour l'histoire).
- 2007: La sommossa di Fermo del 1648, Fermo, (Italian translation of the publication of 1962 accompanied by the transcription of ancient manuscripts).
- 2007: Les procès politiques (XIVe-XVIIe), École française de Rome, 2.
- 2012: Histoire du plus grand pèlerinage des Temps Modernes. Lorette aux XVIe et XVIIe. Presses de la Sorbonne.
- 2014: Révoltes et révolutions dans l'Europe moderne, CNRS éditions, édition revue et complétée.
- 2014: La Dernière Chance. Histoire des suppliques, Perrin.
- 2014: Preface to : Esprit Fléchier, Mémoires sur les grands-jours d'Auvergne :1665, Mercure de France.

== Bibliography ==
- Bernard Barbiche, Jean-Pierre Poussou and Alain Tallon (dir.), Pouvoirs, contestations et comportements dans l'Europe moderne, Mélanges en l'honneur du professeur Yves-Marie Bercé, Presses de l'Université Paris-Sorbonne, Paris, 2005

Preceded by Emmanuel Poulle	Director of the École Nationale des Chartes; 1993–2002	Succeeded by Anita Guerreau-Jalabert
