= Jacques Berlioz (historian) =

French historian

- Born: November 9, 1953 (age 72); Chambéry, France
- Education: École Nationale des Chartes
- Occupations: Historian, writer

Jacques Berlioz (9 November 1953, Chambéry) is a French historian.

== Biography ==
A student at the École Nationale des Chartes, he graduated in 1977 with a thesis devoted to the Tractatus de diversis materiis predicabilibus by Stephen of Bourbon.

Jacques Berlioz has taught in the universities of Lyon 2, Lausanne, Geneva and Fribourg.

From 2006 to 2011, he was director of the École Nationale des Chartes.

== Publications ==
- (with Christian Rochet) Guide du généalogiste et du biographe dans le Jura, CDDP du Jura, Dole, 1980 ISBN 2-86039-000-6;
- Catalogue des journaux et périodiques conservés dans le département du Jura, Archives départementales du Jura, Montmorot, 1981;
- (with Patrick Arabeyre and Philippe Poirrier) Saint-Bernard en Bourgogne : lieux et mémoires, les Éditions du Bien public, Dijon, 1990 ISBN 2-905441-26-7;
- Jacques Berlioz, Marie-Anne Polo de Beaulieu (dir.), Les Exempla médiévaux, GARAE-Hésiode, Carcassonne, 1992 ISBN 2-906156-19-1;
- Vies et légendes de Saint Bernard : création, diffusion, réception. Actes des rencontres de Dijon. 6 et 7 juin 1991, with Philippe Poirrier and Patrick Arabeyre, Cîteaux, Cîteaux, commentarii cistercienses, 1993.
- « Tuez-les tous, Dieu reconnaîtra les siens », la croisade contre les Albigeois vue par Césaire de Heisterbach, Loubatières, Toulouse, 1994 ISBN 2-86266-215-1;
- Jacques Berlioz (dir.), Moines et religieux au Moyen Âge, Seuil, coll. "Points histoire", Paris, 1994 ISBN 2-02-022685-5;
- Jacques Berlioz (dir.), Identifier sources et citations, Brepols, coll. "L'Atelier du médiéviste", Paris, 1994 ISBN 2-503-50311-X;
- Le Commentaire de documents en histoire médiévale, Seuil, Paris, 1996 ISBN 2-02-023126-3;
- Jacques Berlioz, Marie-Anne Polo de Beaulieu (dir.), Les Exempla médiévaux : nouvelles perspectives, H. Champion, Paris, 1998 ISBN 2-85203-943-5;
- Catastrophes naturelles et calamités au Moyen Âge, Ed. del Galluzzo, Florence, 1998. ISBN 88-87027-19-6;
- Le Pays cathare : les religions médiévales et leurs expressions méridionales, Seuil, coll. "Points histoire", 2000 ISBN 2-02-040435-4;
- (avec Jean-Luc Eichenlaub) Stephani de Borbone Tractatus de diuersis materiis predicabilibus. Prologus. Pars prima, "de dono timoris", Brepols, Turnhout, 2002 ISBN 2-503-04241-4.
- Stephani de Borbone Tractatus de diversis materiis predicabilibus. Tertia pars, "de dono scientie", Brepols, Turnhout, 2006 ISBN 2-503-04245-7.
- Jacques Berlioz, Marie Anne Polo de Beaulieu, Pascal Collomb (dir.), Le Tonnerre des exemples. Exempla et médiation culturelle dans l'Occident médiéval, Presses universitaires de Rennes, Rennes, 2010 ISBN 978-27535-1220-7.
- Jacques Berlioz, Marie Anne Polo de Beaulieu (dir.), Collectio exemplorum Cisterciensis in codice Parisiensi 15912 asseruata, Brepols, Turnhout, 2012 ISBN 978-2-503-54004-7.

Preceded by Anita Guerreau-Jalabert	Director of the École Nationale des Chartes; 2006–2011	Succeeded by Jean-Michel Leniaud
