= Pierre Marot =

French medievalist historian

Pierre Eugène Alexandre Marot (English: /mɑːˈroʊ/ mah-ROH, French: [pjɛʁ maʁo]; 15 December 1900, Neufchâteau (Vosges) – 28 November 1992, Paris) was a 20th-century French medievalist historian, director of the École Nationale des Chartes. He was a member of the Institut de France, the Académie de Stanislas, the Société des Amis de Notre-Dame and the Académie des Inscriptions et Belles-Lettres

== Publications ==
- 1924: Lettres inédites de François de Neufchâteau (1781-1792)
- 1925: À propos du centenaire de la Société d'émulation des Vosges
- 1925: Deux feuillets des vies des saints Arnoul et Philibert dans la reliure du cartulaire de l'abbaye de Chaumousey
- 1925: L'Obituaire de Varangéville
- 1925: D'une prétendue numérotation des ducs de Lorraine spéciale aux clercs du trésor des chartes de Lorraine (XVIe siècle)
- 1926: L'élévation des reliques des saints de Remiremont et le Pape Léon IX
- 1926: Les seigneurs lorrains à l'ost de 1383
- 1927: Une représentation du « Santo volto » de Lucques sur un sceau (1412)
- 1930: À quelle époque Saint Nicolas devint-il le patron de la Lorraine ?
- 1930: Jean Beaudouin de Rosières-aux-Salines
- 1931: Notes sur Nicolas Volcyr de Serrouville
- 1931: Charles Sadoul
- 1956: Le culte de Jeanne d'Arc à Domrémy
- 1963: À propos du IIIe centenaire de l'académie
- 1969: Charles Bruneau et les études lorraines
- 1975: Jacques Callot, sa vie, son travail, ses éditions : Nouvelles recherches
- 1975: Les musées des Sociétés savantes, Actes du 100e Congrès national des Sociétés savantes. Colloque interdisciplinaire sur les sociétés savantes, Ministère de l’Éducation nationale, Comité des Travaux Historiques et Scientifiques

== Bibliography ==
- Monfrin, Jacques (1992). "Allocution à l'occasion du décès de M. Pierre Marot, membre de l'Académie". Comptes rendus des séances de l'Académie des Inscriptions et Belles-Lettres. No. 4, 136e année. pp. 847–852..
- Schneider, Jean (1993). "Pierre Marot (1900-1992)". Bibliothèque de l'École des Chartes. Vol. 151. pp. 481–496..

Preceded by Clovis Brunel	Director of the École Nationale des Chartes; 1954–1970	Succeeded by Michel François
