= Anita Guerreau-Jalabert =

French historian and researcher

Anita Guerreau-Jalabert (née Jalabert) is a French medievalist born 25 January 1950 in Marseille.

== Career ==
She obtained her archivist-palaeographer diploma in 1975 with a thesis devoted to Abbo of Fleury, whose Quæstiones grammaticales she edited and commented. After she was graduated with an Agrégation de Lettres Classiques, she joined the CNRS (1978) and was affected to the Institut de recherche et d'histoire des textes.

Anita Guerreau-Jalabert is particularly specialist of kinship relations in the Middle Ages. She leads seminars at the École nationale des chartes and the École des hautes études en sciences sociales.

Director of the École nationale des chartes from 2001 to 2006, she wrote numerous article in scientific journals.

She is married to medievalist Alain Guerreau

== Publications ==
- L'Irak : développement et contradictions, Paris : Le Sycomore, 1978 (with Alain Guerreau).
- édition critique de : Abbon de Fleury, Questions grammaticales (Quaestiones grammaticales), Paris : Les Belles Lettres, 1982.
- Index des motifs narratifs dans les romans arthuriens français en vers (XIIe-XIIIe siècles), Genève : Droz, 1992.
- Codirection de Histoire culturelle de la France. I, Le Moyen Âge, Paris : Le Seuil, 1997.

Preceded by Yves-Marie Bercé	Director of the École Nationale des Chartes; 2002–2006	Succeeded by Jacques Berlioz
