= Félix Grat =

French politician (1898–1940)

Deputy for Mayenne
- In office 3 May 1936 – 13 May 1940

Personal details
- Born: Félix Eugène Grat; 12 November 1898 Paris, France
- Died: 13 May 1940 (aged 41) Volmerange-les-Mines, France
- Party: Independent
- Occupation: Historian

Félix Eugène Grat (12 November 1898 – 13 May 1940) was a French politician and historian. An independent candidate, he was elected in 1936 to represent Mayenne in the National Assembly. He was killed in action during the Second World War in 1940.

== Life ==
Born in the 2nd arrondissement of Paris in 1898, Grat graduated from the Lycée Condorcet with a bachelor's degree in letters in 1917. Upon his graduation, he enlisted to fight in the First World War and was awarded a Croix de guerre for valiant service. After the war, he pursued a degree in law at the École Nationale des Chartes and was appointed a member of the French Academy in Rome in 1923. Grat spent two years researching Latin texts in the Vatican and discovered several previously unknown works written by Tacitus. After returning to France in 1925, he became a lecturer at the École pratique des hautes études and was appointed a professor of palaeography at Sorbonne University. From 1931, he taught the history of the Middle Ages in Nancy.

In 1936, Grat was an independent candidate in the legislative elections in the department of Mayenne. His wife's family owned large amounts of land in the area, allowing him to become a political influence in the largely agriculture-focused region. Facing outgoing Deputy Joseph Boüessé, Grat was elected Deputy with 50% of the vote. Sitting in the Assembly with members of the conservative Republican Federation party, he was concerned with agriculture, labor policies, and foreign affairs. He opposed the 1936 devaluation of the franc and also conducted a mission in the Levant while secretary of the Foreign Affairs Committee. While a politician, Grat also founded the Institute for Research and History of Texts, which focuses on researching ancient and medieval manuscripts.

During the Second World War, Grat re-enlisted in the army and served on the frontline, again being rewarded the Croix de Guerre for his service. In early 1940, he presented his concerns about the army's lack of preparation for war in the National Assembly. On 13 May, three days after the beginning of the German invasion of France, Grat was killed in action near Volmerange-les-Mines. He was temporarily buried in Fontoy. Grat was the first Deputy killed during the Second World War.
