= Dommartin-lès-Remiremont =

- Commune
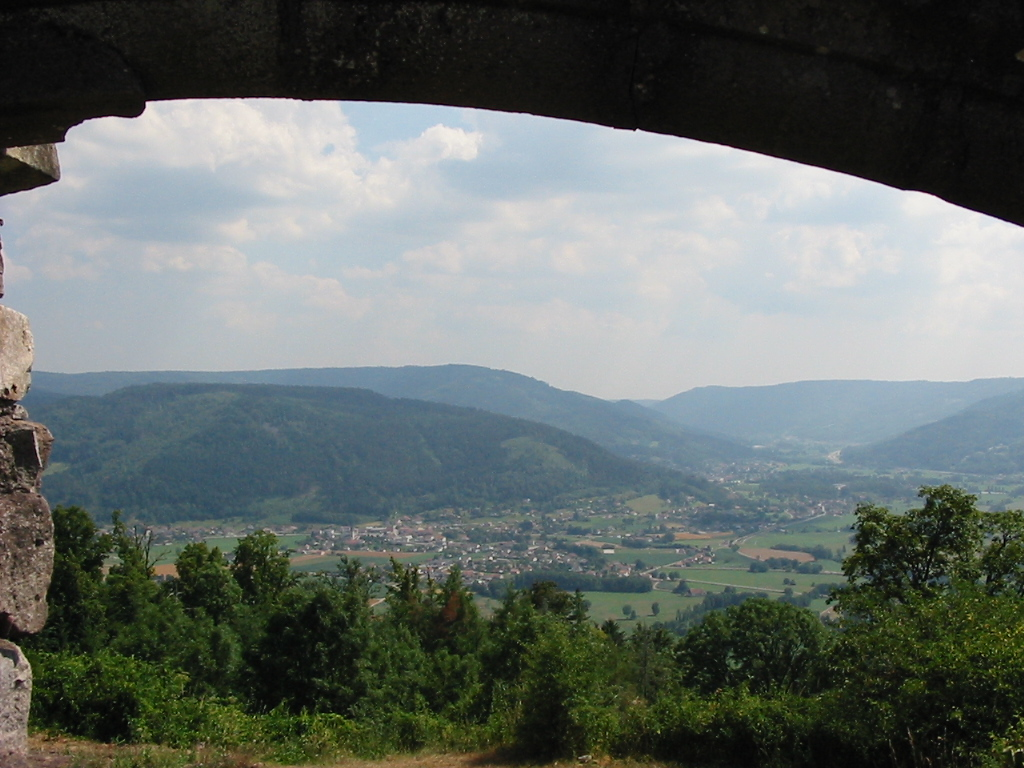
- The commune seen from the Saint-Mont
- Location of Dommartin-lès-Remiremont
- Location within France Location within Grand Est
- Coordinates: 47°59′57″N 6°38′38″E
- Country: France
- Region: Grand Est
- Department: Vosges
- Arrondissement: Épinal
- Canton: Le Thillot
- Intercommunality: CC Porte des Vosges Méridionales

Government
  - Mayor (2020–2026): Catherine Louis
- Area^{1}: 21.08 km^{2} (8.14 sq mi)
- Elevation: 392 m (1,286 ft)
- Highest elevation: 842 m (2,762 ft)
- Lowest elevation: 383 m (1,257 ft)
- Population (2023): 1,921
  - Density: 91.13/km^{2} (236.0/sq mi)
- Time zone: UTC+01:00 (CET)
  - Summer (DST): UTC+02:00 (CEST)
- INSEE/Postal code: 88148 /88200
- ^{1} French Land Register data, which excludes lakes, ponds, glaciers > 1 km^{2} (0.386 sq mi or 247 acres) and river estuaries.

Dommartin-lès-Remiremont (French pronunciation: [dɔmaʁtɛ̃ lɛ ʁəmiʁmɔ̃], literally Dommartin near Remiremont) is a commune in the Vosges department in Grand Est in northeastern France. The archivist-palaeographer Michel François (1906–1981) was born in Dommartin.

== Demography ==
Historical population
Year	Pop.	±% p.a.
1968	1,156	—
1975	1,429	+3.08%
1982	1,661	+2.17%
1990	1,763	+0.75%
1999	1,800	+0.23%
2007	1,847	+0.32%
2012	1,835	−0.13%
2017	1,894	+0.63%
2023	1,921	+0.24%
Source: INSEE

== See also ==
- Communes of the Vosges department
