= Michel François (archivist) =

French archivist, palaeographer and historian (1906–1981)

- Born: 31 August 1906; Dommartin-lès-Remiremont (Vosges)
- Died: 11 July 1981 (aged 74); Paris
- Occupations: Historian; Archivist; Palaeographer

Michel Marie François (French pronunciation: [miʃɛl fʁɑ̃swa]; 31 August 1906 – 11 July 1981) was a French archivist, palaeographer and historian.

== Biography ==
Michel François joined the École Nationale des Chartes in 1927 and graduated first place in the 1931 class with a thesis entitled Histoire des comtes et du comté de Vaudémont au Moyen Âge, which earned him the Molinier prize and was published soon after by the Lorraine Archaeological Society. François gained his doctorate from the École pratique des hautes études.

His rank output led to his being appointed a member of the French School of Rome. He joined the Palazzo Farnese in 1932 after his military service.

After he returned to France, he joined the manuscripts cabinet of the Bibliothèque nationale on 1 January 1934, where he wrote, with Philippe Lauer, a valuable guide to sources of the religious history of France in the manuscripts department. He was appointed to the Archives nationales on 1 May 1935.

Attracted to teaching, he supplied Robert Marichal from 1942 to 1945, then a POW in Germany, to the chair of language and French literature from the Middle Ages at the Institut catholique de Paris. In 1942–1943, he provided locum for Charles Samaran in his Latin and French palaeography conference at the École pratique des hautes études.

He joined the French army at the start of WWII; he was arrested and imprisoned in 1942.

He was awarded the Commander of the Legion of Honor in 1969.

On 3 November 1949, he was appointed master of conference of medieval history at the Institut Catholique de Paris; He became an assistant professor in 1952 and professor in 1955. Finally, on 1 October 1953 he succeeded Charles Perrat to the chair of history of political, administrative and judicial of France at the École des chartes.

He also taught at the Sorbonne from 1954 to 1977, an introductory course to historical research, renamed "course of historiography and archiving" in 1967. In 1964, at the death of Alain Dain, he was elected dean of the Faculty of Arts of the Institut catholique and member of the Académie des Inscriptions et Belles-Lettres in 1969. On 1 October 1970 he was appointed director of the École des Chartes in replacement of Pierre Marot.

== Publications ==
François’s books include;

- History of the Counts and County of Vaudémont (1935)
- Correspondence of Cardinal de Tournon (1946)
- Cardinal François de Tournon, Statesman, Diplomat, Patron and Humanist (1951)
- Letters of Henry III, King of France (four volumes) (1959-1984).

Preceded by Pierre Marot	Director of the École Nationale des Chartes; 1970–1976	Succeeded by Jacques Monfrin
