= Alexandre Teulet =

French archivist (1807–1866)

- Born: January 29, 1807; Charleville-Mézières
- Died: March 23, 1866; Champigny-sur-Marne
- Occupations: Archivist, Palaeographer

Academic background
- Education: École Nationale des Chartes

Alexandre Teulet (January 29, 1807- March 23, 1866) was a French Palaeographer, archivist, and historian. His full name was Jean Baptiste Alexandre Théodore Teulet.

His father was General Raymond Teulet.

After graduating from the École Nationale des Chartes in 1832, he was appointed to National Archives of France where he spent his entire career. He also wrote histories and chronicle of the Middle Ages, including works of Einhard.

== Influence on Scottish historiography ==
Teulet visited Scotland in the late 1830s, making contact with David Laing, secretary of the Bannatyne Club, which subsequently published his five-volume Papiers d'État, Pièces et Documents Inédits ou Peu Connus Relatifs à l'Histoire de l'Écosse au XVIe Siècle, tirés des Bibliothèques et des Archives de France (1851–60). The Scottish historian John Hill Burton reviewed the work favourably and drew upon it in writing his seven volume History of Scotland from Agricola's Invasion to the Revolution (1867–70)
