= École Nationale des Chartes =

French grande école specialising in historical sciences and archival studies

Coordinates: 48°50′56″N 2°20′34″E

École Nationale des Chartes – PSL
- École nationale des chartes – PSL
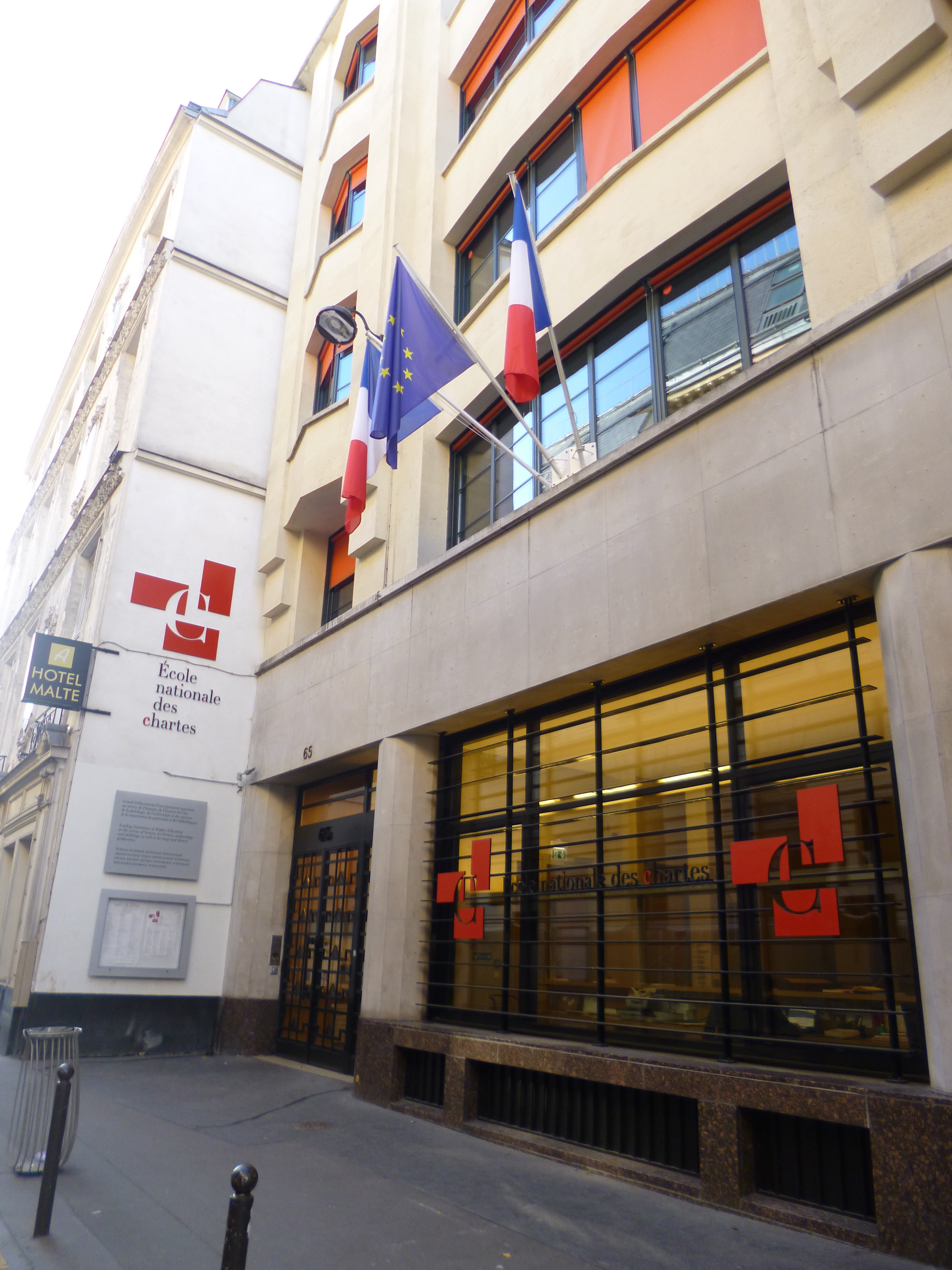
- The school building at 65 rue de Richelieu, Paris
- Other name: National School of Charters
- Former names: École royale des chartes (1822–1848); École impériale des chartes (1852–1871)
- Type: Grande école; Grand établissement
- Established: 22 February 1821; 205 years ago
- Affiliations: PSL University; Campus Condorcet
- Director: Jean-François Balaudé (provisional administrator)
- Location: 65 rue de Richelieu, Paris, France
- Campus: 2nd arrondissement of Paris
- Language: French
- Website: www.chartes.psl.eu

The École Nationale des Chartes – PSL (French pronunciation: [ekɔl nɑsjɔnal de ʃaʁt]), sometimes rendered in English as the National School of Charters, is a French grande école and grand établissement specialising in the historical sciences, archival studies, palaeography, diplomatics, the history of the book and digital humanities. Founded by royal ordinance on 22 February 1821, it is a constituent institution of PSL University.

The school was originally associated with the National Archives and was later located at the Palais de la Sorbonne. Since October 2014, it has been based at 65 rue de Richelieu in the 2nd arrondissement of Paris, opposite the Richelieu site of the Bibliothèque nationale de France.

Students admitted to the archivist-palaeographer programme are recruited through a highly selective competitive examination and may hold the status of trainee civil servants. After completing their studies and defending a thesis, they receive the qualification of archivist-paleographer. Graduates commonly pursue careers as heritage curators, archivists, library curators, lecturers and researchers in the humanities and social sciences. The school also offers master's degrees, introduced in 2005, and doctoral programmes, introduced in 2011.

== History ==
The École des Chartes was created by order of Louis XVIII on 22 February 1821, although its roots are in the Revolution and the Napoleonic period. The Revolution, during which property was confiscated, congregations were suppressed and competencies were transferred from the Church to the State, produced radical cultural changes. In 1793 the feudalist Antoine Maugard approached the public instruction committee of the Convention with a proposal for a project of historical and diplomatic education. The project was never carried out, and Maugard was largely forgotten. The institution was eventually created by the philologist and anthropologist Joseph Marie de Gérando, baron of the Empire and general secretary to Champagny, the Minister of the Interior. In 1807 he submitted a proposal to Napoleon for the creation of a school to train young scholars of history. Napoleon examined the proposal and declared that he wished to develop a much larger specialist history school. However, Gérando was posted to Italy on an administrative mission, and the project was interrupted. At the end of 1820, Gérando convinced Count Siméon, a philosopher and professor of law who had been state councilor under the Empire and who was at that time Minister of the Interior, of the usefulness of an institution modeled on the grandes écoles, dedicated to the study of "a branch of French literature", the charters. The 1820s were a favorable period for the creation of the École des Chartes. Firstly this was because the atmosphere of nostalgia for the Middle Ages created a desire to train specialists who would, by carrying out a direct study of archives and manuscripts confiscated during the Revolution, be able to renew French historiography. Secondly, the need was also felt to maintain this branch of study, which stemmed from Maurist tradition, since the field was endangered by a lack of knowledgeable collaborators in the "science of charters and manuscripts". And thirdly, during the reign of Louis XVIII, a period which saw the return of the Ultras and during which the constitutional monarchy was called into question, the political context influenced the creation of an institution whose name inevitably made explicit reference to the defense of the Charter.

Under the order of 1821, twelve students were nominated by the Minister of the Interior, based on propositions by the Académie des Inscriptions et Belles-Lettres, and they were paid during the two years of their studies. They principally studied paleography and philology, with a purely practical aim: to be able to read and understand the documents that they would be responsible for curating. The professors and students of the school were placed under the authority of the curator of medieval manuscripts of the Royal Library, rue de Richelieu, and of the general guard of the Archives of the Kingdom.

This first experience was not very successful, mainly because no job openings were reserved for the students. The first course was implemented in two stages by the ministerial decree of 11 May (for the Royal Library course) and by the decree of 21 December 1821 (for the Archives of the Kingdom course) and was the only one run. The Académie did put forward a new list of candidates, and the course length was set at two years by the Order of 16 July 1823, but lessons had to be suspended on 19 December 1823 due to a lack of students. However, following a long period of inactivity, the Ministry of the Interior decided to re-open the school. Rives, the director of staff of the ministry, together with Dacier, drew up a report on the reorganization of the School and a draft order, proposed to Charles X by La Bourdonnaye, which resulted in the order of 11 November 1829. The school was now open to anyone who had acquired the Baccalaureate, but six to eight students were selected by competitive examination at the end of the first year. They received a salary and followed two further years of training. On completion of their studies, they received the qualification of archivist-paleographer and were reserved half of the available jobs in libraries and archives. The first valedictorian was Alexandre Teulet.

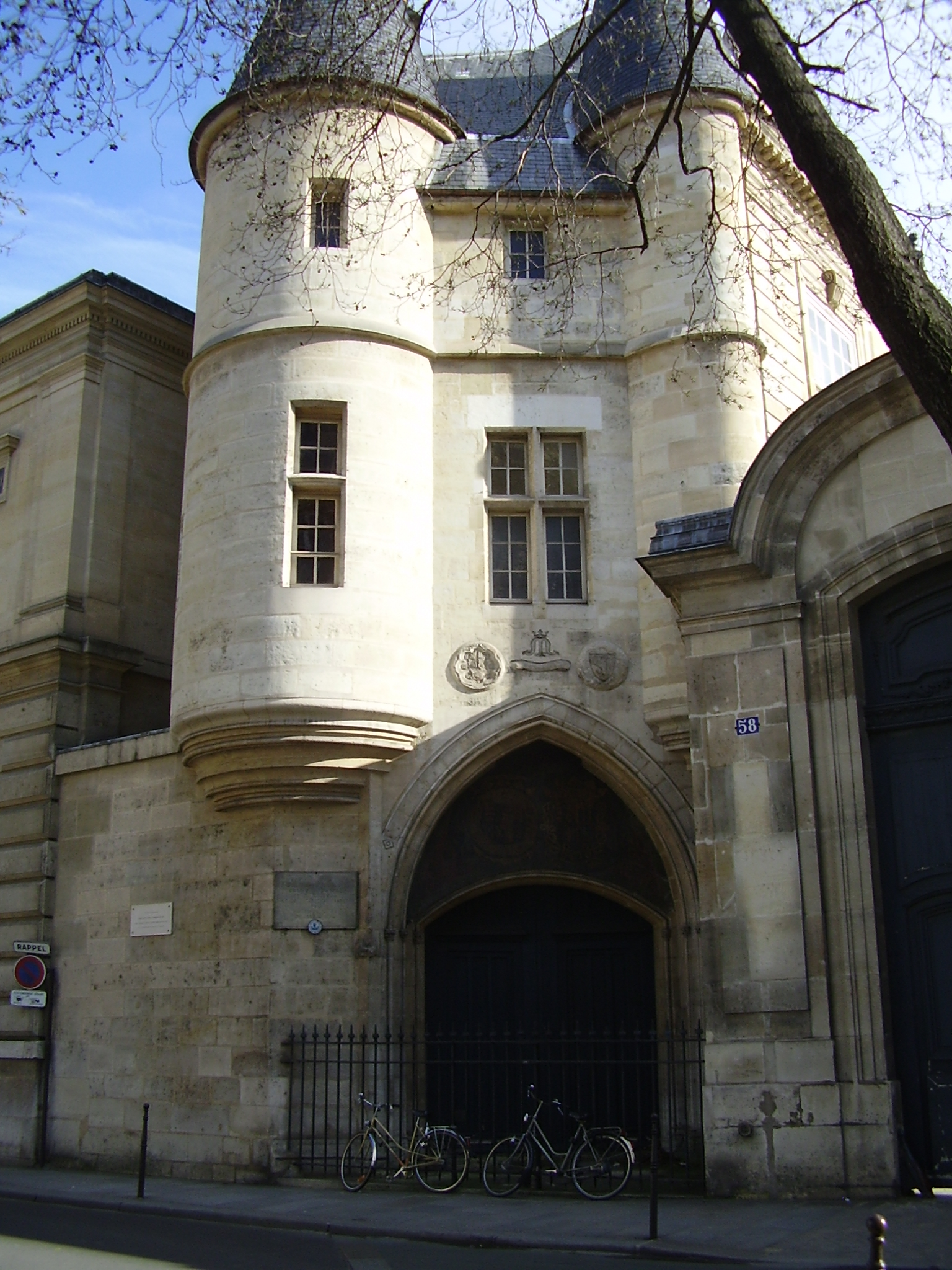
The Hôtel de Clisson and entrance to the École des Chartes from 1846 to 1866

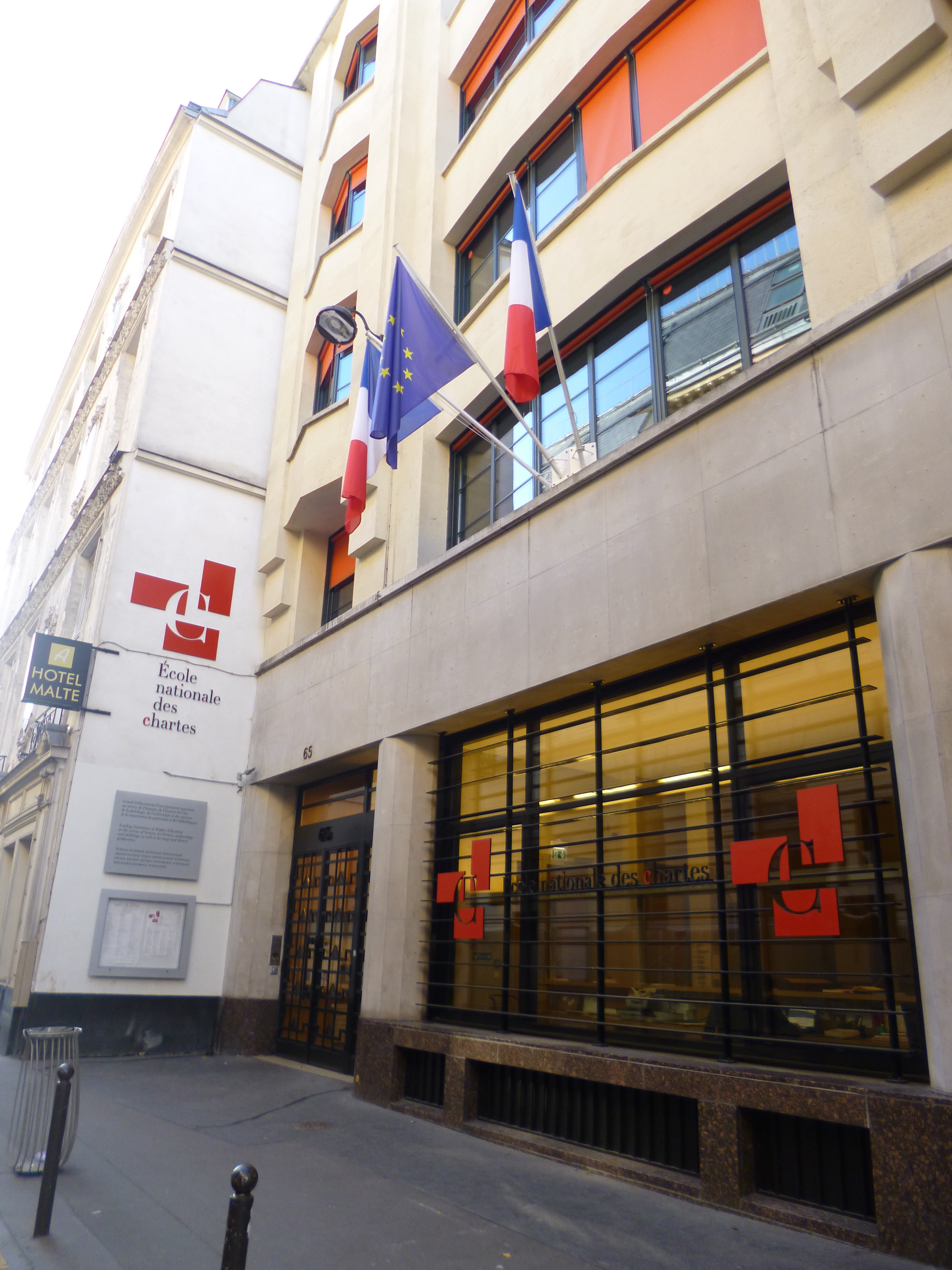
The new building of the École, located 65, rue de Richelieu

The "Guizot period" benefited the École des Chartes, which soon became an important institution in the field of historical – particularly medieval – studies. On 24 March 1839 the Société de l’École des Chartes was founded by Louis Douët d'Arcq, among others, and it published the Bibliothèque de l'École des Chartes, one of the oldest French scientific reviews, to disseminate the work carried out in the school. The Order of 31 December 1846 implemented a fundamental reorganization of the school and its study program, which then remained unchanged for more than a century. The students, who were holders of the Baccalaureate, were recruited by examination (which shortly afterwards became a competitive examination), and followed a three-year course of studies. Interdisciplinarity, an essential characteristic of the school, was then written into the reform, which required students to study six subjects, some of which were not taught anywhere else. The second innovation, a thesis, was introduced, with the first public defense being held in 1849. A surveillance council was set up, consisting of the guard of the Archives, the director of the Royal Library, the director of the School and five members of the Académie des Inscriptions et Belles-Lettres. The school was finally provided with a new statute. It moved to the Kingdom Archives in the hôtel de Soubise, in the oval hall and adjacent rooms of the hôtel de Clisson.

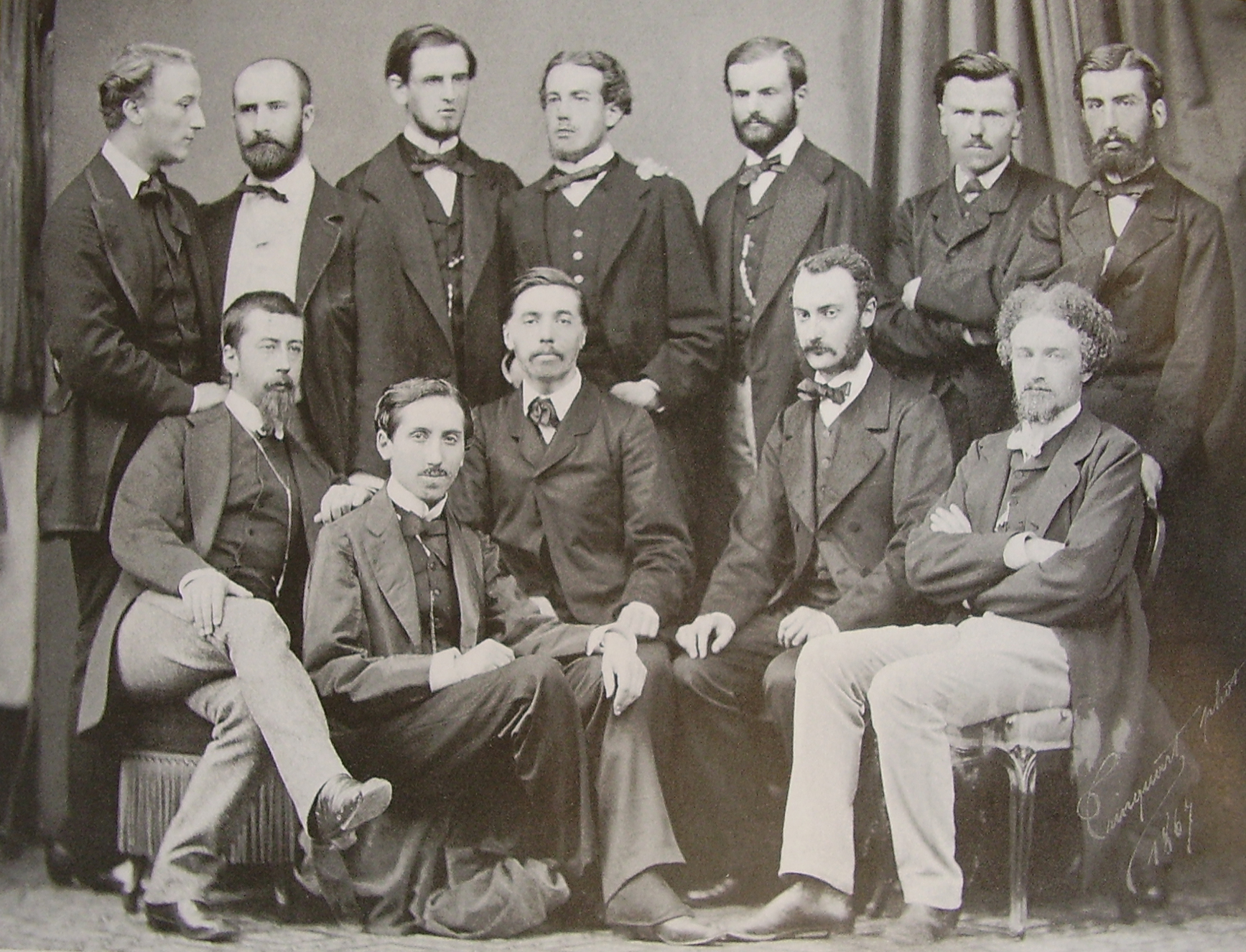
The students of 1857

By now, the École des Chartes had become a point of reference in Europe. Its historical research methodology had been greatly modernized, as had its teaching methods, thanks to the copies of ancient documents to which it had access. The students were taught paleography, sigillography, numismatics, philology, filing for archives and libraries, historical geography, currencies, systems of weights and measures, the history of political institutions in France, archeology, civil law, canonic law and feudal law. The teaching had both a scientific and a professional aim.

Thus, by gradually being integrated into the network of royal then national and departmental archive services, the graduates of the school contributed to the strengthening of the network and to the improvement of archival principles. A career-path for the graduates was thus established in the archives, first implemented by the Order of 31 December 1846, then reinforced by a legislative framework providing them with a means to enforce this law. The decree of 4 February 1850 reserved the posts of departmental archivist to those holding the qualification of archivist-paleographer, while all the positions at the National Archives (except that of senior civil servant) were reserved for them by the decree of 14 May 1887. The same could not be said of libraries. The order of 1839 was never applied, and although the order of 1839 reserved places at the Royal Library for École des Chartes graduates, fewer than 7% of them worked in a library in 1867. It was not until the end of the Second Empire, partly thanks to the work of Léopold Delisle, the general administrator of the national library, that the qualifications of the school's graduates were recognized by libraries. Little by little, decrees and orders facilitated their access to jobs in libraries.

The school moved in 1866 into more suitable premises in the hôtel de Breteuil, rue des Francs-Bourgeois, without this move having much effect on the teaching. In the same year a number of the alumni of the school were involved with the creation of the Revue des questions historiques, the first scholarly history journal in France and although influenced by German techniques it was also influenced by the careful historical techniques of the school. Seven professorships were instituted by the decree of 30 January 1869: paleography; Latin languages; bibliography; filing for libraries and archives; diplomacy; political, administrative and judiciary institutions in France; civil and canonic law of the Middle Ages and archeology of the Middle Ages. Apart from minor modifications, these remained unchanged until 1955. The school moved once again in 1897, to 19 rue de la Sorbonne, into the premises originally intended for the Paris Faculté de théologie catholique. This move brought the school geographically closer to the other research and teaching institutions based at the Sorbonne, such as the Faculté de lettres and the École pratique des hautes études. The school had a classroom, with windows along both sides and special deep desks for paleography practice, as well as a library, in which books were available for immediate access. Although the premises have been refurbished, the school is still located here today. During the 1920s, a number of moves to other premises were proposed, with suggestions including the hôtel de Rohan in 1924, the garden of the Institution for Deaf-Mutes (suggested by Michel Roux-Spitz), a plot on rue Notre-Dame-des-Champs, a house on rue de Vaugirard, the former Polytechnic School, and the refectory of the Bernardins. The school will move in 2015 to the Richelieu area, into new premises at 65 rue de Richelieu and 12 rue des Petits-Champs. The school was also a founding member of the Campus Condorcet, and for this reason, some of its research activities were conducted at the Aubervilliers campus.

The image of the École des Chartes, in political and social terms, was firmly anchored, even though it has sometimes been classified as a right-wing institution. The image of the "right-wing chartiste" originated in the figure of the "amateur", the son of a well-off family, passing through the school to kill time elegantly, or to "wait", in the words of Robert Martin du Gard, who graduated from the school in 1905. In fact, throughout the 19th century there was a discontinuity between the high-prestige training offered by the École des Chartes and the lower-prestige, modestly remunerated jobs open to graduates. However, this reputation was at least partly unfounded, as demonstrated by several cases. At the time of the Dreyfus Affair, for example, the milieu of the École des Chartes mirrored the divisions in French society: "Nowhere were civic quarrels more completely invested in the job of historian." The few chartistes who were called upon as experts during the Zola trial – Arthur Giry, Auguste Molinier, Paul Meyer, Paul Viollet and Gaston Paris – and those who were involved in the founding of the League of Human Rights were attacked by other archivist-paleographers, including Robert de Lasteyrie, Gabriel Hanotaux and Émile Couard, as well as by their students at the École des Chartes. The variety of engagements at the time of the Dreyfus Affair did not necessarily reflect the political sensitivities of those involved, and their motives were political as well as professional, jeopardizing the very training and methods of the school. Although it was conservative to some extent, the school admitted a female student, Geneviève Acloque, in 1906, long before the other grandes écoles had started admitting women. The École des Chartes may have been perceived as a bastion of the French Action during the interwar period, although several relatively prominent alumni, such as Georges Bataille or Roger Martin du Gard, seem to have been more left-leaning. During the Second World War, there were therefore more École des Chartes students and teachers on the side of the Resistance than on the side of Vichy. Bertrand Joly concludes that the school was largely neutral, in that each "wing" seems to have been equally represented, a neutrality that was also justified by the fact that the school was not big enough for its members to have a significant effect on national politics.

The entrance examination and internal examinations of the École des Chartes were reformed at the beginning of the 1930s. At this time, the school began offering the qualification of diplôme technique de bibliothécaire (DTB) 34, which was required to obtain a job as a librarian in first-category municipal libraries or university libraries. The school opened its classes on the history of books and bibliography to external students preparing for the qualification. This practice continued until 1950, when the diplôme supérieur de bibliothécaire (DSB) replaced the DTB as the qualification for librarians.

The mid-20th century was a difficult period for the school as it struggled to modernize. Its student numbers dropped sharply (there were only 11 archivist-paleographers in the class of 1959). Its training was considered to be outdated and lacking in the latest approaches to history, notably the historiographic revival of the Annales School. It was not until the 1990s, when the entrance examination and teaching were reformed and a new policy was introduced, that the school really saw a revival. It entered a period of development under the direction of Yves-Marie Bercé (1992–2001) and Anita Guerreau-Jalabert (2001–2006). The current development of the school is based on solid training in new technologies and their application to the conservation of cultural heritage, and closer, more structured links with French universities and similar institutions in other European countries. The teaching has also been restructured to be better suited to the current demands of scientific research and evolution in conservation jobs. This approach will be introduced gradually as of the academic year 2014–15.

Since the current director, Jean-Michel Leniaud, took up his post in 2011, the school has once more reformed its entrance examination to focus student recruitment on the specifics of the training, while also expanding the training to a broader field of human and social sciences, adapting it to the European context and recruitment conditions within conservation organizations. The range of subjects taught, which was expanded in the 1990s to include the history of art, now also includes archeology, the history of contemporary law, and history of property law. The course has been extended from three years to three years and nine months, aligning training in fundamental scientific techniques with empowerment in conservation jobs. In no other social and human sciences institution is the study of history, philology and law integrated to this extent into the conservation of archives, books monuments and works of art, be they inventories, historic monuments or museums.

As well as improving the recruitment process and upgrading the training of future archivist-paleographers, the school has introduced specialized Master's programs focusing on digital technologies adapted to the humanities. It has recently introduced a continuing training service that takes into account the validation des acquis de l'expérience (VAE) (a certification accrediting work experience). The school's collaboration with the Établissement Public de Coopération Scientific (Campus Condorcet Paris-Aubervilliers), the ComUE heSam University and the Sorbonne Universities demonstrates the new directions that it has taken in recent years. To this end, it has modernized its administration, implemented ambitious communications programs and established a new campus opposite the National Library on rue de Richelieu. It is thus preparing to fulfill as effectively as possible the public service role assigned to it by the government.

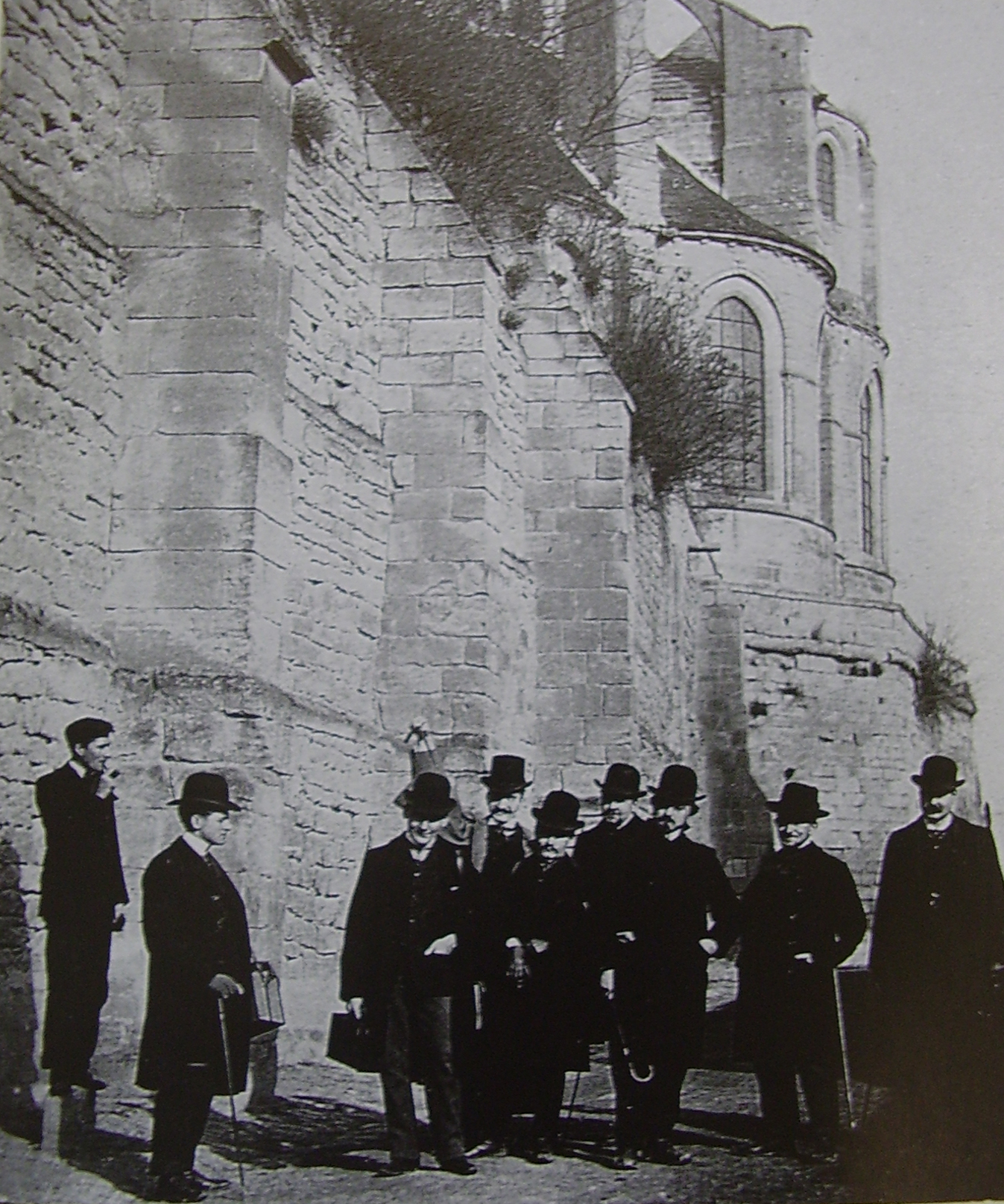
Students of the École des Chartes on a study trip to Saint-Leu d'Esserent (1903).

== Missions ==
The École nationale des Chartes is regulated by the statute of 27 January 1984, modified by statute no. 2013-660 of 22 July 2013 which relates to higher education and research. Article 3 of decree no. 87-832 of 8 October 1897 modified by decree no. 2005-1751 of 30 December 2005 defines the missions of the school as follows:

The mission of the École nationale des Chartes is to provide training for the scientific staff of archives and libraries. It trains those who contribute to scientific knowledge and the protection of national heritage. It engages in the training and research of students in the human and social sciences, particularly in disciplines relating to critical study, exploitation, conservation and communication of historic sources.

== Organization ==
The governing bodies are composed of the director of the School, the administrative council and the scientific council. The director is selected from among the directors of studies of the École pratique des hautes études, the École nationale des Chartes and the École française d'Extrême-Orient, or from among professors of the universities and members of affiliated institutions. The director is appointed by decree of the President of the Republic for a term of five years, renewable once under the conditions of the article. The director is assisted by a director of studies and a general director of services. The administrative council, consists of 21 members, including four unelected members, ten members appointed by the minister responsible for higher education, two of whom are members of the Institute, and seven elected members, three of whom are teachers, two of whom are IATOS (non-teaching staff) and two of whom are students. The scientific council37, headed by the director of the School, includes all the teachers who are directors of studies, as well as other unelected members. It also includes fifteen appointed members, five of whom are members of the Institute, as well as an elected teacher and a student representative. The Paris URFIST (an inter-academic research and training body) and the Committee of Historical and Scientific Work are affiliated with the l'École des Chartes.

== Training ==
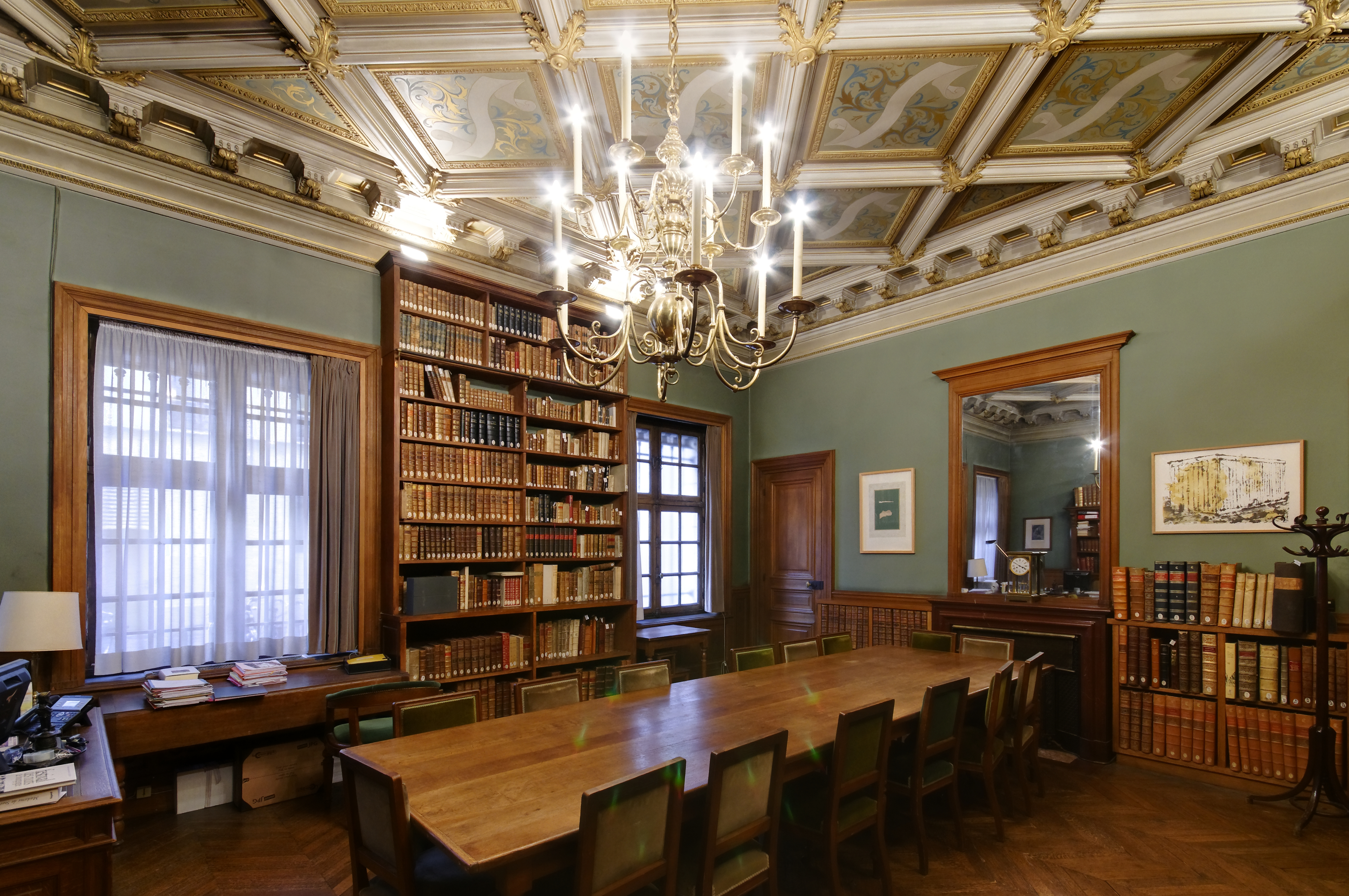
The director's office

=== Archivist-paleographers ===
==== Entrance examinations ====
French students are recruited by competitive examination prepared in literary-oriented classes préparatoires in and outside Paris. Since 1991, it has been divided into two sections:

- Section A, "Classics". This includes, among other subjects, medieval history, modern history and Latin. Studies at the School require fluency in Latin.
- Section B, "Modern". This is part of the École normale supérieure's banque d'épreuves littéraires (BEL), a set of entrance examinations valid for several schools, and includes modern history, contemporary history and modern languages among its subjects.

Students prepare for the entrance examination in dedicated classes préparatoires, the first year of which is known as "hypoChartes" and the second year "Chartes". Depending on the school, students preparing for examination A and those preparing for examination B may be grouped into a single cohort with different options, or they may be divided into two different cohorts. Those preparing for Section B can be grouped into khâgnes with additional options. Candidates who can provide proof of at least a bachelor's degree in theory may take an examination to be allowed to proceed directly into the second year. This examination is aimed at candidates who are already conducting research at an advanced level. There is a strict limit on the number of candidates admitted after succeeding the entrance examination. Their number was reduced from 30 to 20 in three years, which is lower than the number of positions available to graduates of the school (in archives, libraries, museums, etc.). This extremely selective process makes the school probably one of the most elitist in the world.

==== Status of the students ====
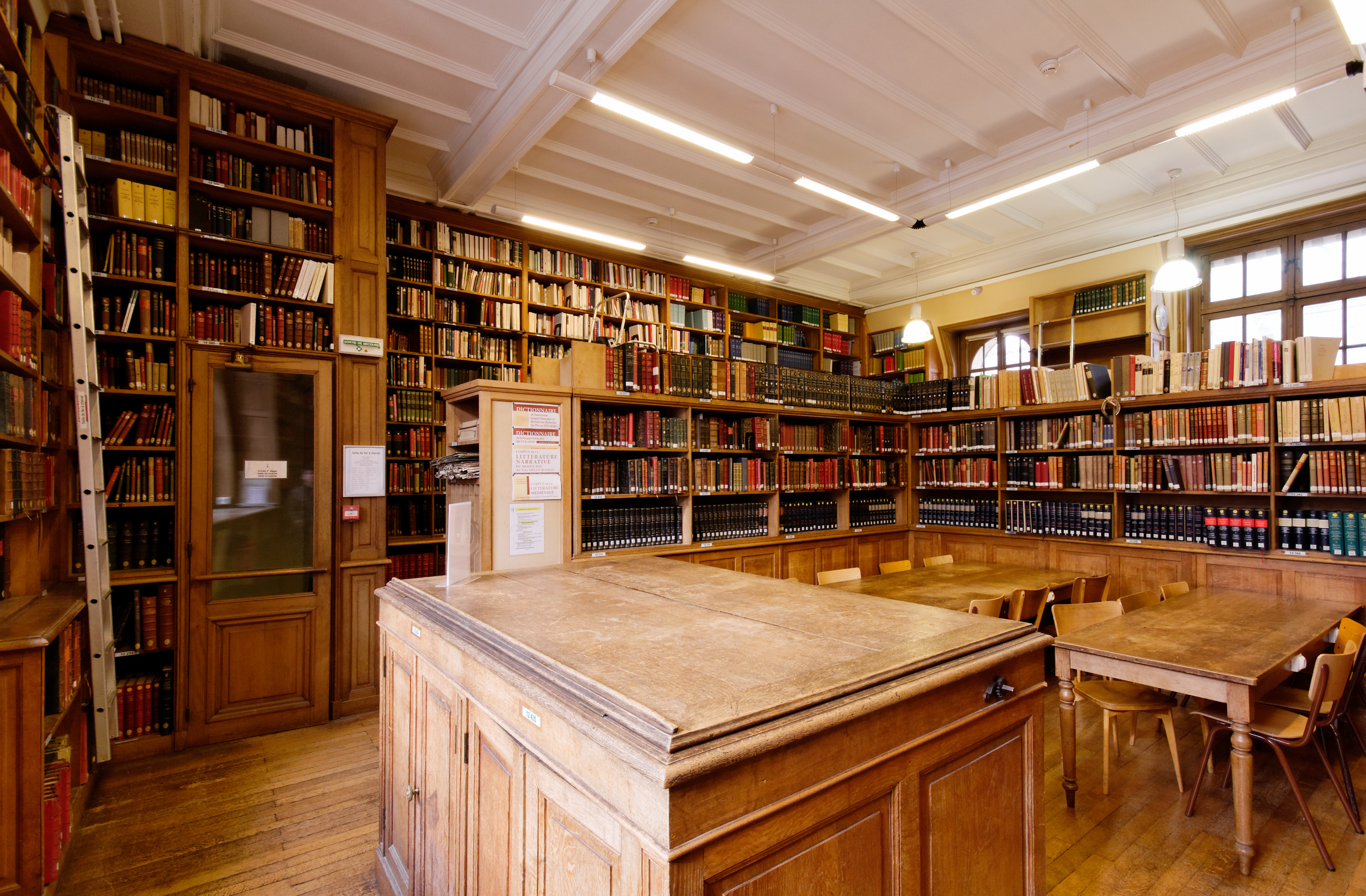
The "Horseshoe Room" on the first floor of the library

Students recruited by competitive examination can assume the status of trainee civil servants, being paid (currently approximately €1250/month net) in exchange for committing to a ten-year engagement. Those who pass the examination may choose whether or not to accept this status. Foreign students who are recruited by examination or on the basis of qualifications (according to the international selection procedure) are not remunerated while they follow the course, although they can apply for a scholarship.

The course duration is three years and nine months. At the end of their studies, the students submit a thesis, which qualifies them as archivist-paleographers.

Those who have fulfilled their third-year obligations can apply for two écoles d'application: the École nationale supérieure des sciences de l'information et des bibliothèques (Enssib, reserved competitive examination) and the Institut national du patrimoine (INP). Following their studies in these schools, they may join the professions of either curators of libraries or curators of heritage. Each year, a number of students sit the INP's examination in the visual branches (Museums, Historic Monuments and Inventories) or the agrégation examination (History, Classic or Modern Letters and Grammar), thus following either a research-oriented or a teaching-oriented career path.

==== Training and teaching ====
The course takes place over eight semesters, of which six are dedicated to teaching. As well as a common core of subjects, students choose options according to their scientific and professional objectives. These options can be taken externally through a university. Internships play an important role, with a five-month compulsory internship in an institution in the field of conservation (e.g. archives, libraries, museums, or heritage or archeological services) in France, and three months in a similar institution abroad. The principal subjects studied are:

- Latin and French paleography (plus other languages in seminars)
- archiving, diplomacy and history of the institutions that have produced these archives (medieval, modern and contemporary)
- history of civil and canon law
- history of contemporary law
- Roman philology
- medieval Latin
- history of art (medieval, modern and contemporary)
- archeology
- editing of texts
- bibliography
- history of books
- manuscripts and medieval literary texts
- statistics and cartography for the study of history
- modern languages and IT

ECTS credits are allocated to the subjects, making it possible for students from universities or other grandes écoles to follow some of them and for the subjects to be included in the external students' Master's qualifications. This is made possible by the new LMD reform, which harmonizes French academic qualifications with other European ones. Classes are also open to independent auditors.

=== Master's ===
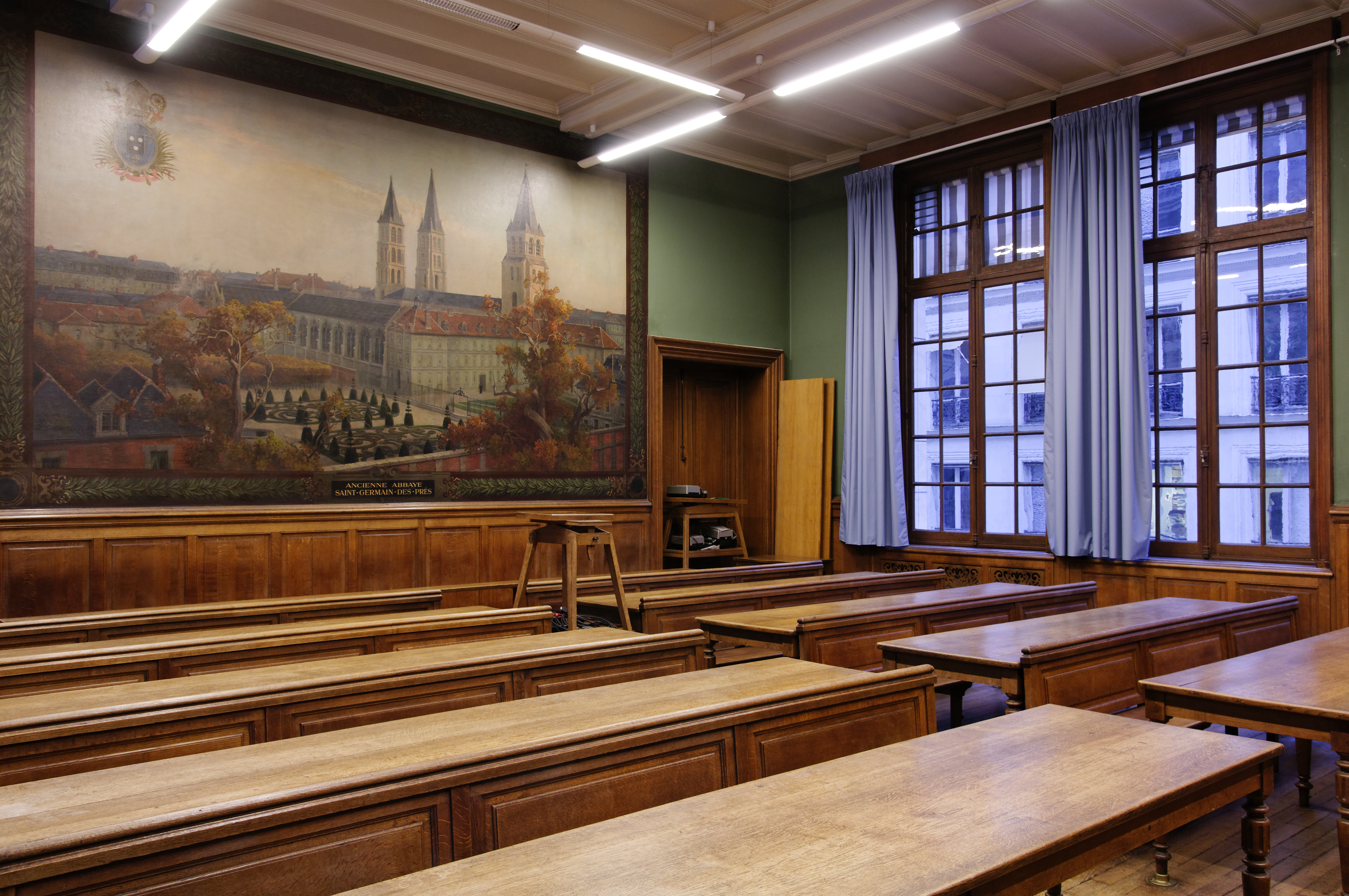
The "Great Room" (a classroom) with a mural depicting the abbey of Saint-Germain-des-Prés

In 2006 the École des Chartes introduced a Master's program in Digital Technologies Applied to History and has since then trained approximately 20 students per year. In the first year, all students take the same basic modules plus three options (archiving, history of books and media, and history of art). The first year of the Master's is a continuance of the École des Chartes undergraduate training. In the second year, students follow more specialized training in the field of IT applied to webcasting. There are two possible paths, one more research-oriented and the other, which is more vocational, oriented towards the dissemination of knowledge in a heritage service.

In 2011, the École des Chartes introduced a further two Master's courses. The first, in Medieval Studies, is offered in partnership with the École normale supérieure, the University of Paris III and the University of Paris IV. Its aim is to "provide training in literary research for medieval texts, with an interdisciplinary approach in the context of specialization in the Middle Ages". The second, run in partnership with the École normale supérieure Paris-Saclay and the Institut national de l'audiovisuel, is in Audiovisual Design: Plurimedial Representations of History, Society and Science. It aims to "train designers and makers of audiovisual documentaries (for cinema, television, radio and internet) as well as creators and heads of multimedia sites operating in the written press and publishing".

=== Doctorate ===
The École nationale des Chartes awards doctorates in the subjects that it teaches. Any student holding a master's degree, whether or not it was awarded by the École des Chartes, can apply to enroll in a doctoral program at the school. The doctorate is prepared through two collaborating doctoral schools: the École pratique des hautes études (for doctorates in medieval history, history of art, archeology, Roman philology and Latin) and the Paris Sorbonne University (for doctorates in modern and contemporary history).

=== The Institut national du patrimoine's classe préparatoire intégrée ===
Detailed article: Institut national du patrimoine (France).

The École des Chartes provides part of the preparation for the competitive examination for heritage curators (archive specialization) for students of the INP's classe préparatoire intégrée. These students are selected on the basis of social and academic criteria.

== Research ==
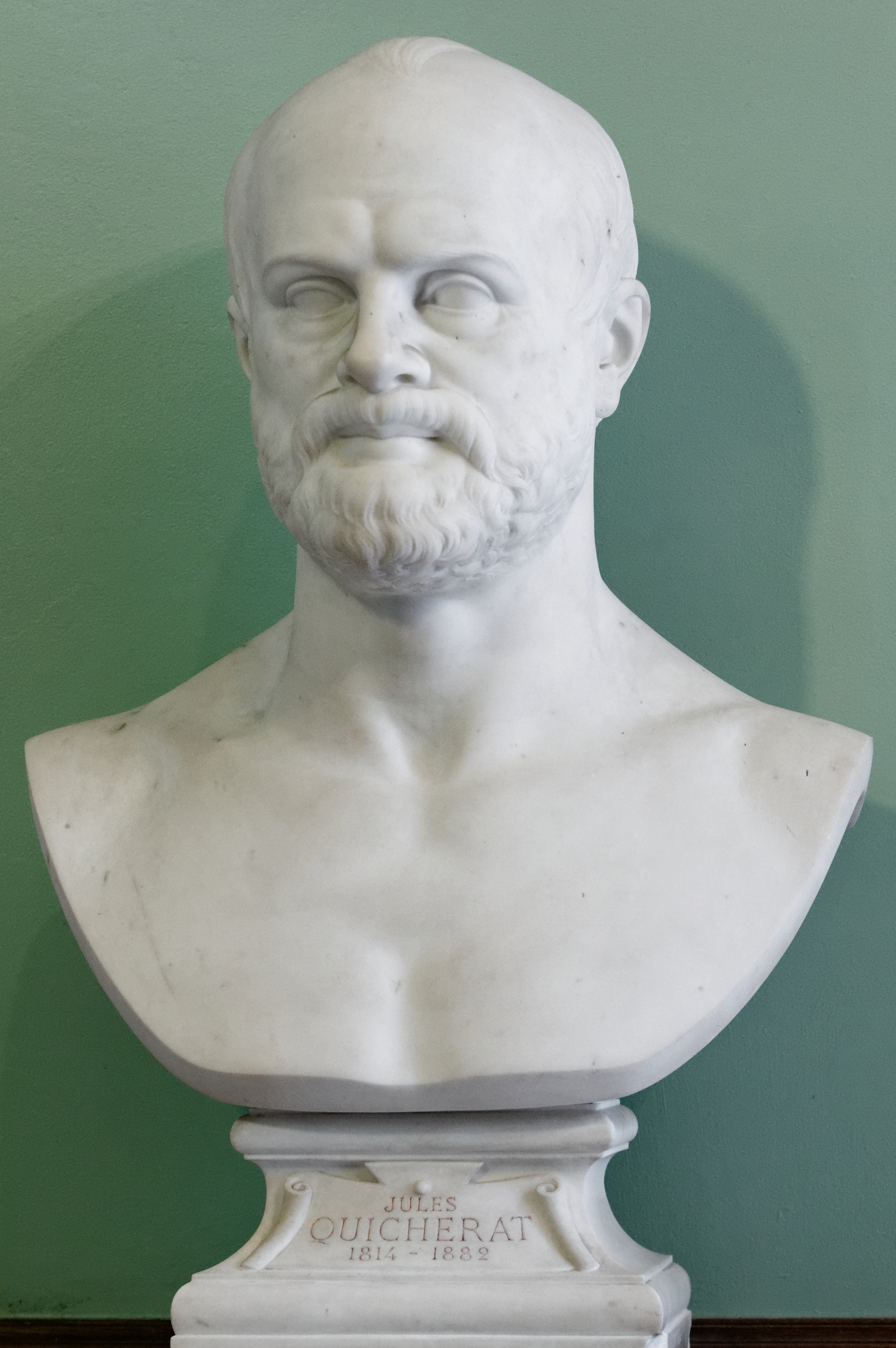
Bust of Jules Quicherat by Jean Petit

Most of the professors at the École nationale des Chartes are affiliated to the Centre Jean-Mabillon, the École's research unit, whose director is currently Olivier Poncet. The aim of the centre's research program is to cover all the processes that explain and publicize the written production from the Middle Ages to the present, through various stages:

- the conditions of production (axis 1: the cultures of writing from the Middle Ages to the 21st century)
- the mechanisms of heritage transmission (axis 2: genesis and tradition of written heritage: author, institutions, laws, study, etc.)
- the conditions of returning this historic documentation to the scientific community (axis 3: epistemology and the norms of editing texts and images in the digital age)

A significant part of the school's research activity is the theses of the students, whose fields of studies have diversified over the years and now relate to all periods of history, notably contemporary.

== Partnerships ==
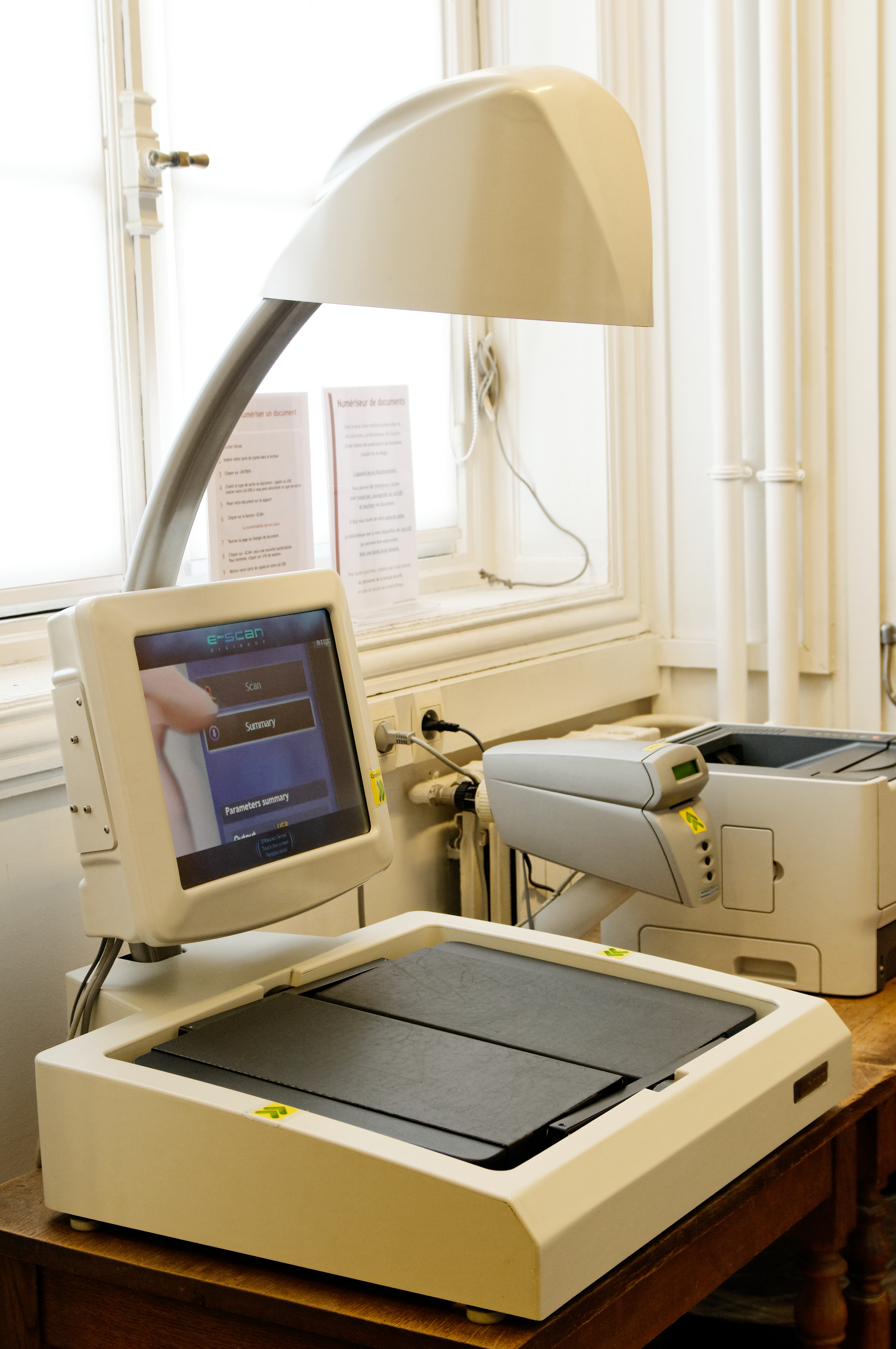
A scanner in the library, available for students' use in 2012

Partnerships with other institutions form one of the central policies of the current administration, which collaborates closely with the École pratique des hautes études, the Institut de recherche et d'histoire des textes and the Centre d'études superieures de civilisation médiévale of the University of Poitiers to create the École d'Érudition en réseau. The École des Chartes is also part of the Institut d'histoire du livre together with the City of Lyon (its municipal library and Museum of printing works), the École normale supérieure of Lyon and the Enssib.

The École des Chartes also collaborates with other higher education establishments in Paris to form the ComUE heSam University, the ComUE Sorbonne Universities and the Campus Condorcet Paris-Aubervilliers.

The school also has partnerships with institutions outside France, such as the Russian State Archives, a number of Moscow libraries, the University of Alicante, and some Italian research centers. The school takes in a number of foreign students, who are often Swiss, Belgian or from francophone African countries, and is currently seeking to attract new students for shorter stays, through partnerships with universities. The school's students are also regularly invited to do internships in archives or libraries in other countries.

== The library ==
The library was created by the order of 31 December 1846. At the time it occupied one of the two rooms reserved for the school in the hôtel de Soubise. The library moved with the school in 1897, and since then has occupied the second floor (reading room and history room), third floor (Horseshoe Room) and fourth floor (offices and store rooms in the attic).

In 1920, the management of the library was taken over by the secretary of the school, who at the time was René Poupardin. Today it is managed by a library curator.

It was designed as a research library. Its collections are particularly well supplied in the subjects taught at the school: medieval history, philology, history of books, bibliography, etc. The collections (around 150,000 volumes) are all available for immediate access. The catalogue is available online. Many electronic resources are also available.

Due to lack of space at the Sorbonne, the library moved in 2017 to 12 rue des Petits-Champs, into much larger premises.

== Dissemination of knowledge ==
The École nationale des Chartes disseminates scientific works in its fields of specialization, in printed and electronic format. It has published four collections of works in the printed format :

- Mémoires et Documents, a collection dating from 1896, consisting of monographs, most notably the theses of École des Chartes alumni
- Études et Rencontres, a collection begun in 1998, principally consisting of the minutes of scientific meetings
- Matériaux pour l'Histoire, a collection inaugurated in 1996, consisting of richly illustrated quarto volumes
- Études et documents for a Gallia Pontificia, a collection jointly edited by the École nationale des Chartes and the German Historical Institute of Paris since 2009 with the aim of presenting the work carried out as part of the Gallia Pontificia, a scientific enterprise that aims to identify, publish and study the papal acts concerning France dating from before 1198

The École des Chartes also publishes two periodic publications relating to the training it offers :

- Abstracts of theses submitted by students to obtain their qualification of archivist-paleographer, published annually by the École des Chartes since 1849. Since 2000, they have also been available online
- Hypotheses. Works of the University of Paris I Panthéon-Sorbonne doctoral school of history and the École nationale des Chartes, co-edited by the École nationale des Chartes and Sorbonne publications since 2010

These works are disseminated by CID-FMSH, through the Comptoir des presses de l'université. Since 2002, the École des Chartes has also published scientific works in electronic format in its online collection of publications, the Éditions en ligne de l'École des Chartes (ELEC). This gives scientific works digital functions and brings together repertoires and databases as well as texts, in a format that is more suited than printed versions to detailed examination. This collection is completed by :

- corpora of text made available online for research purposes, unedited by the École des charts
- teaching materials, available on the THELEME website
- a space for the presentation of the IT tools and methods developed by the École des Chartes

These materials are under an open license.

The school develops its scientific and teaching work through several initiatives, including the Thélème website 48, which offers materials supporting the subjects taught at the school, such as educational packs, advice, lessons, and interactive facsimiles.

== École des Chartes publications ==
The École des Chartes also publishes numerous works, in both paper and electronic format. The Mémoires et documents de l'École des Chartes are monographs, many of them drawn from École des Chartes theses or doctoral research. The first of these was published in 1896 and they are distributed by Honoré Champion and Droz. Two more collections, the Études et rencontres (minutes of conventions and brief monographs) and Matériaux pour l'histoire (illustrated large-format albums), have been created more recently. ELEC is also responsible for the school's online publications, which include databases, editions of texts, minutes of symposia, bibliographies, and studies.

== The Société de l'École des Chartes ==
The Société de l'École des Chartes is registered as a public-interest association, which students and alumni can join. Its current president is Marie-Françoise Limon-Bonnet, who was elected in 2018. Twice a year, the Société publishes the Bibliothèque de l'École des Chartes with the support of the École. This scientific review, founded in 1839, is one of the oldest in France.

== Some famous École des Chartes alumni ==
=== Archives, libraries, research ===
- Pierre Aubry (1874–1910), musicologist
- Jean-François Bergier (1931–2009), modernist
- Léopold Victor Delisle (1826–1910), librarian
- Jean Favier (1932–2014), medievalist and archivist
- Arthur Giry (1848–99), professor at the École des Chartes
- Louis Halphen (1880–1950), medievalist
- Suzanne Honoré (1909–2000), archivist, librarian, historian
- Antoine Le Roux de Lincy (1806–1869), medievalist
- Charles-Victor Langlois (1863–1929), medievalist and archivist
- Henri-Jean Martin (1924–2007), historian of books
- Émile Maupas (1842–1916), librarian and zoologist
- Auguste Molinier (1851–1904), professor at the École des Chartes
- Michel Pastoureau (born 1947), medievalist
- Ngô Đình Nhu (1910–1963), archivist (Director of National Library of Vietnam from 1945 to 1946)
- Régine Pernoud (1909–98), medievalist
- Marcel Poëte (1866–1950), librarian, historian and urban planner
- Jean Richard (1921–2021), medievalist
- Paul Viollet (1840–1914), professor at the École des Chartes
- Dominique de Courcelles (1953–), historian of ideas
- Suzanne Dobelmann (1905–1993), librarian and curator
- Jeanne Vielliard (1894–1979), archivist

=== Clergy ===
- Jules Doinel
- George Bernard Flahiff
- Joan Tarré i Sans
- Maurice de Germiny
- Henri Brincard

=== Politics ===
- Charles Beauquier
- Camille Pelletan
- Gabriel Hanotaux
- Louis Germain-Martin
- François de Clermont-Tonnerre
- Félix Grat
- Lucien Romier
- Ngô Đình Nhu (1910 - 1963), State Counsellor of South Vietnam from 1955 to 1963

=== Literature ===
- Roger Martin du Gard
- Valérie Mangin
- André Chamson
- Georges Bataille
- René Girard
- Édith Thomas

Some biographers, perhaps overgeneralizing, also use the term chartiste to refer to certain French historians, such as La Villemarqué, Achille Jubinal, Pierre Lalo and Louis Madelin, or foreign historians, such as Alfred Métraux, K. J. Conant or Aleksander Gieysztor, who audited some of the lessons at the École des Chartes, or to Auguste Poulet-Malassis, José-Maria de Heredia and François Mauriac, who were registered as students but who never completed their studies.

=== List of directors of the École des Chartes ===
Beginning	End	Name	Function
1847	1848	Jean-Antoine Letronne	member of the Institut (Académie des Inscriptions et Belles-Lettres)
1848	1854	Benjamin Guérard	professor at the École des Chartes, member of the Institut
1854	1857	Natalis de Wailly	member of the Institut
1857	1871	Léon Lacabane	professor at the École des Chartes
1871	1882	Jules Quicherat	professor at the École des Chartes
1882	1916	Paul Meyer	professor at the École des Chartes, member of the Institut
1916	1930	Maurice Prou	professor at the École des Chartes, member of the Institut
1930	1954	Clovis Brunel	professor at the École des Chartes, director of studies at the École pratique des hautes études, member of the Institut
1954	1970	Pierre Marot	professor at the École des Chartes, member of the Institut
1970	1976	Michel François	professor at the École des Chartes, member of the Institut
1976	1987	Jacques Monfrin	professor at the École des Chartes, director of studies at the École pratique des hautes études, member of the Institut
1987	1993	Emmanuel Poulle	professor at the École des Chartes, member of the Institut
1993	2002	Yves-Marie Bercé	professor at the Paris-Sorbonne University, member of the Institut
2002	2006	Anita Guerreau-Jalabert	director of research at the French National Center for Scientific Research
2006	2011	Jacques Berlioz	director of research at the French National Center for Scientific Research
2011	2016	Jean-Michel Leniaud	director of studies at the École pratique des hautes études, professor at the École des Chartes
2016	current	Michelle Bubenicek	professor at the University of Franche-Comté

== See also ==
- Comité des travaux historiques et scientifiques (CTHS) (Committee for Historic and Scientific Works)

=== Sources ===
- The theses submitted at the École des Chartes since 1849 are kept at the National Archives on shelf no. ABXXVIII.
- The papers of the Société de l'École des Chartes are also kept at the National Archives on shelf no. 11AS.
