= Arthur Giry =

French historian

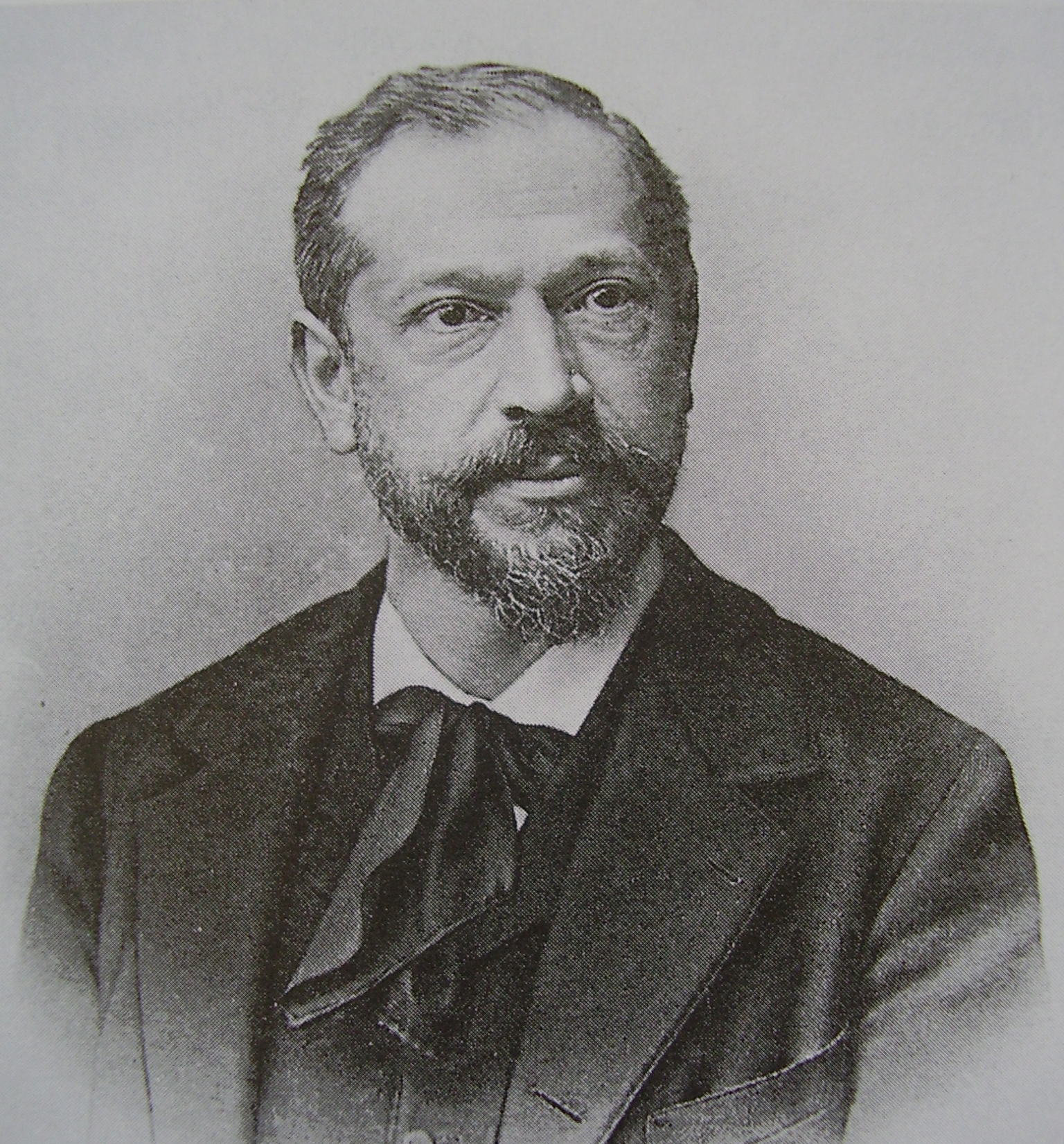
- Born: Jean-Marie-Joseph-Arthur Giry; 29 February 1848; Trévoux, France
- Died: 13 November 1899 (aged 51); Paris, France
- Occupation: Historian

Signature
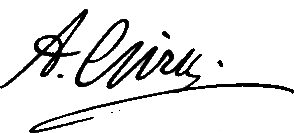

Jean-Marie-Joseph-Arthur Giry (29 February 1848 – 13 November 1899) was a French historian, noted for his studies of France in the Middle Ages.

== Biography ==
He was born at Trévoux. After rapidly completing his classical studies at the lycée at Chartres, he spent some time in the administrative service and in journalism. He then entered the École Nationale des Chartes, where, under the influence of J. Quicherat, he developed a strong inclination to the study of the Middle Ages. The lectures at the École pratique des hautes études, which he attended from its foundation in 1868, revealed his true bent; and henceforth he devoted himself almost entirely to scholarship.

He began modestly by the study of the municipal charters of Saint-Omer. Having been appointed assistant lecturer and afterwards full lecturer at the École des Hautes Études, it was to the town of Saint-Omer that he devoted his first lectures and his first important work, Histoire de la ville de Saint-Omer et de ses institutions jusqu'au XIVe siècle (1877). He, however, soon realized that the charters of one town can only be understood by comparing them with those of other towns, and he was gradually led to continue the work which Augustin Thierry had broadly outlined in his studies on the Tiers Etat.

A minute knowledge of printed books and a methodical examination of departmental and communal archives furnished him with material for a long course of successful lectures, which gave rise to some important works on municipal history and led to a great revival of interest in the origins and significance of the urban communities in France. Giry himself published Les Établissements de Rouen (1883-1885), a study, based on very minute researches, of the charter granted to the capital of Normandy by Henry II, King of England, and of the diffusion of similar charters throughout the French dominions of the Plantagenets; a collection of Documents sur les relations de la royauté avec les villes de France de 1180 à 1314 (1885); and Étude sur les origines de la commune de Saint-Quentin (1887).

About this time personal considerations induced Giry to devote the greater part of his activity to the study of diplomatics, which had been much neglected at the École des Chartes, but had made great strides in Germany. As assistant (1883) and successor (1885) to Louis de Mas Latrie, Giry restored the study of diplomatics, which had been founded in France by Dom Jean Mabillon, to its legitimate importance. In 1894 he published his Manuel de diplomatique, a monument of lucid and well arranged erudition, which contained the fruits of his long experience of archives, original documents and textual criticism; and his pupils, especially those at the École des Hautes Études, soon caught his enthusiasm. With their collaboration he undertook the preparation of an inventory and, subsequently, of a critical edition of the Carolingian diplomas. By arrangement with Engelbert Mühlbacher and the editors of the Monumenta Germaniae Historica, this part of the joint work was reserved for Giry.

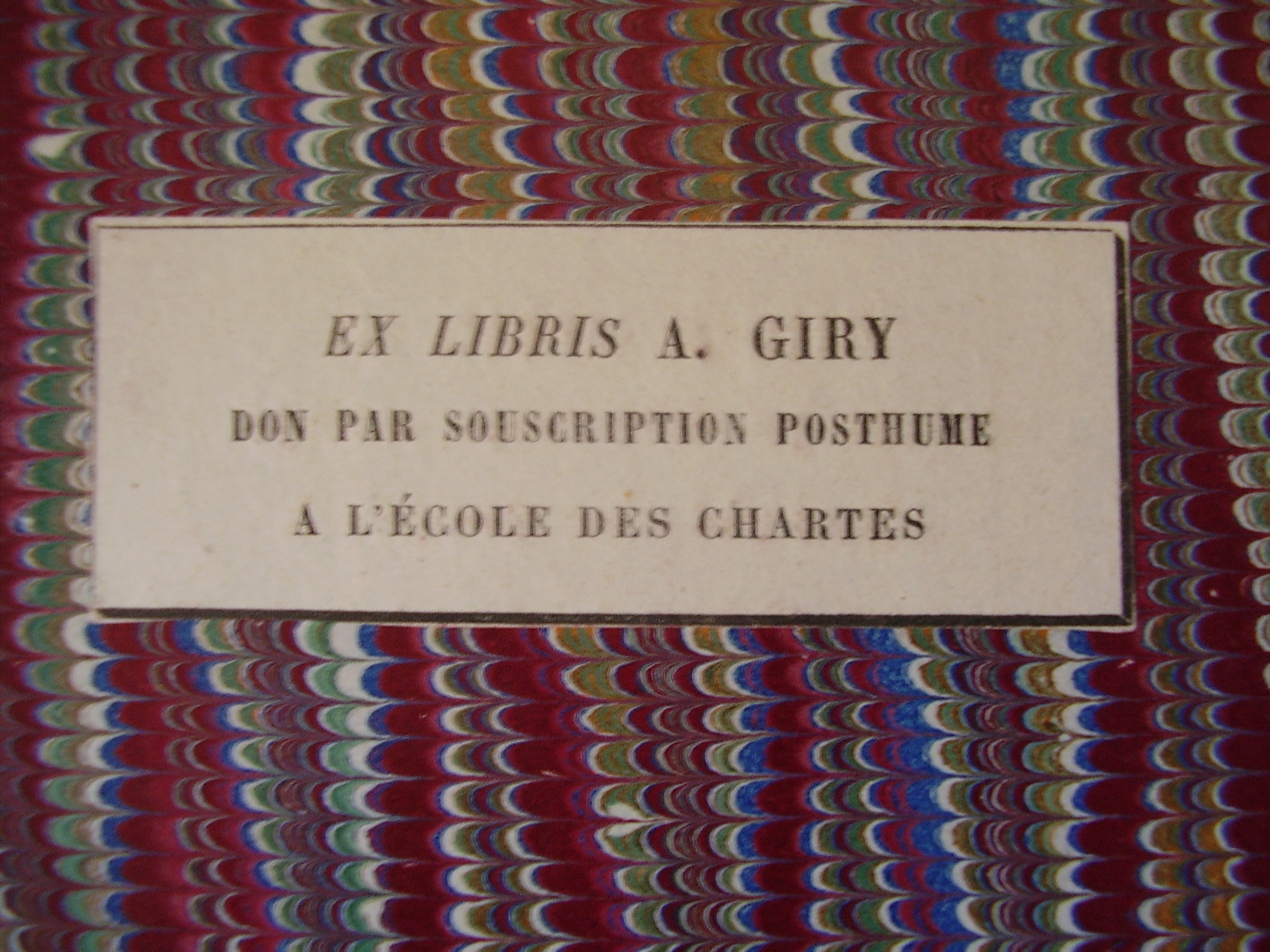
Arthur Giry's Bookplate.

Simultaneously with this work he carried on the publication of the annals of the Carolingian epoch on the model of the German Jahrbücher, reserving for himself the reign of Charles the Bald. Of this series his pupils produced in his lifetime Les Derniers Carolingiens (by Ferdinand Lot, 1891), Eudes, comte de Paris et roi de France (by Édouard Favré, 1893), and Charles le Simple (by Auguste Eckel, 1899). The biographies of Louis IV and Hugh Capet and the history of the kingdom of Provence were not published until after his death, and his own unfinished history of Charles the Bald was left to be completed by his pupils. The preliminary work on the Carolingian diplomas involved such lengthy and costly researches that the Académie des Inscriptions et Belles-Lettres took over the expenses after Giry's death.

In the midst of these multifarious labours Giry found time for extensive archaeological researches, and made a special study of the medieval treatises dealing with the technical processes employed in the arts and industries. He prepared a new edition of the monk Theophilus' celebrated treatise, Diversarum artium schedula, and for several years devoted his Saturday mornings to laboratory research with the chemist Aimé Girard at the Conservatoire des Arts et Métiers, the results of which were utilized by Marcellin Berthelot in the first volume (1894) of his Chimie au moyen âge.

Giry took an energetic part in the Collection de textes relatifs a l'histoire du moyen âge, which was due in great measure to his initiative. He was appointed director of the section of French history in La Grande Encyclopédie, and contributed more than a hundred articles, many of which, e.g. "Archives" and "Diplomatique", were original works. In collaboration with his pupil André Réville, he wrote the chapters on L'émancipation des villes, les communes et les bourgeoisies and Le Commerce et l'industrie au moyen âge for the Histoire générale of Lavisse and Rambaud.

Giry took a keen interest in politics, joining the republican party and writing numerous articles in the republican newspapers, mainly on historical subjects. He was intensely interested in the Dreyfus case, but his robust constitution was undermined by the anxieties and disappointments occasioned by the Zola trial and the Rennes court-martial, and he died in Paris in 1899.

== Publications ==
- L'École des chartes, 1875
- Les établissements de Rouen, 1883
- Analyse et extraits d'un registre des archives municipales de Saint-Omer, 1166-1778, 1875
- Notes sur l'Influence artistique du Roi René, 1875
- Histoire de la ville de Saint-Omer et de ses institutions, 1877
- Notice sur un traité du Moyen Âge intitulé : De coloribus et artibus Romanorum, 1878
- Recueil de fac-similés à l'usage de l'École des chartes, 1880
- Chartes de Saint-Martin de Tours collationnés par Baluze, 1881
- Cartulaires de l'église de Térouane, 1881
- Jules Quicherat, 1814-1882, 1882
- Documents sur les relations de la royauté avec les villes en France de 1180 à 1314, 1885
- Mélanges d'archéologie et d'histoire, 1885-1886
- Études sur les origines de la commune de Saint-Quentin, 1887
- Les derniers Carolingiens, Lothaire, Louis V, Charles de Lorraine (954-991), 1891
- Manuel de diplomatique : diplômes et chartes, chronologie technique, éléments critiques et parties constitutives de la teneur des chartes, les chancelleries, les actes privés available at Gallica, 1894 (the online edition dates from 1925.)
- La Donation de Rueil à l'abbaye de Saint-Denis, examen critique de trois diplômes de Charles le Chauve, 1895
- La France et l'Affaire Dreyfus, 1899.
- Étude critique de quelques documents angevins de l'époque carolingienne, 1900
- Notices bibliographiques sur les archives des églises et des monastères de l'époque carolingienne, 1901
- Monuments de l'histoire des abbayes de Saint-Philibert (Noirmoutier, Grandlieu, Tournus), 1905
- Recueil des actes de Charles II le Chauve, roi de France, commencé par Arthur Giry, continué par Maurice Prou, terminé et publ. sous la dir. de MM. Ferdinand Lot et Clovis Brunel, 1955
