= Comité des travaux historiques et scientifiques =

French learned society

The Comité des travaux historiques et scientifiques (CTHS) (Committee for Historic and Scientific Works) is a French research institution created by the Minister of Public Education François Guizot on 18 July 1834 for the purpose of 'leading research and making available unpublished documents, with funds voted from the state budget." Its mission includes promoting the work of learned societies. It is currently affiliated to the École Nationale des Chartes. In 2017, its president was Maurice Hamon and its deputy head was Christophe Marion.

== Original remit ==
While he was Minister of Public Instruction, François Guizot was much occupied with what he described in his report of 31 December 1833 as the "systematic publication of all significant materials about the history of our country which are still unedited." To this end he established a committee on 18 July 1834, charged with directing research into documents and, with the support of public funds, their publication in its journal Documents inédits de l’Histoire de France. On 10 January 1835 a second committee was set up to undertake research and publication of documents in literature, philosophy, the arts and the sciences which are of significance to general history. A Historic Works Bureau was established by Hippolyte Royer-Collard in the Science and Letters section of the Ministry to manage the committees.

== Historical development ==
In 1875, the committee came under the authority of the Ministry of Higher Education. On 5 March 1881, the committee assumed its current name and was divided into two sections, one for history, archaeology and philology, and the second with the sciences, each having its own publication commission. It had 90 members and 200 corresponding members. In 1883 it was divided again, into five sections - history and philology; archaeology; economic and social sciences; mathematical sciences, physics, chemistry and meteorology; and natural and geographic sciences.

A reform in 1956, created a new structure - archaeology; geography; modern and contemporary history; philology and history to 1715; sciences; and economic and social sciences. In 1983, the sections were reorganised and amalgamated - history of science and technology; prehistory and early history; French anthropology and ethnology.

In 2000, the structure was designated as follows:

1. Prehistory and early history section - 25 members
2. Archaeology and ancient civilisation - 30 members
3. History and philology of medieval civilisation - 25 members
4. Archaeology and art history of medieval and modern civilisation - 25 members
5. History of the modern world, the French Revolution and other revolutions - 30 members
6. Contemporary history - 30 members
7. Social anthropology, ethnology and regional languages - 20 members
8. Science, history of science and technology and industrial archaeology - 45 members
9. Geographical and environmental sciences - 25 members

Each section meets between four and six times per year. Members, whether French or foreign, have the right to take part in meetings and to vote. Corresponding members, emeritus members and non-members may be invited to attend meetings, but do not vote.

In 2005, an order from the Minister of Higher Education and Research brought the Committee within the remit of the École nationale des chartes, though its sectional structure was left unchanged.

== Activities ==
- Since 1834 the CTHS has published works of research and higher education. Each year, numerous new items appear and are distributed by the Association Française des Presses d’Université - Diffusion (AFPU-D) and distributed by Sodis.
- Each year, the Historic and scientific Societies' conference is held in a French-speaking university town. Its main purpose is to promote interdisciplinary working and collaborative working, doctoral studies and university research. It brings together more than 700 delegates and involves more than 400 papers.
- The CTHS supports exchanges between learned societies by means of a directory, a newsletter and a catalogue of papers published by the societies. It also operates an online forum for learned societies.

== See also ==
- Société de l'histoire de France
