= Paul Viollet =

French historian (1840–1914)

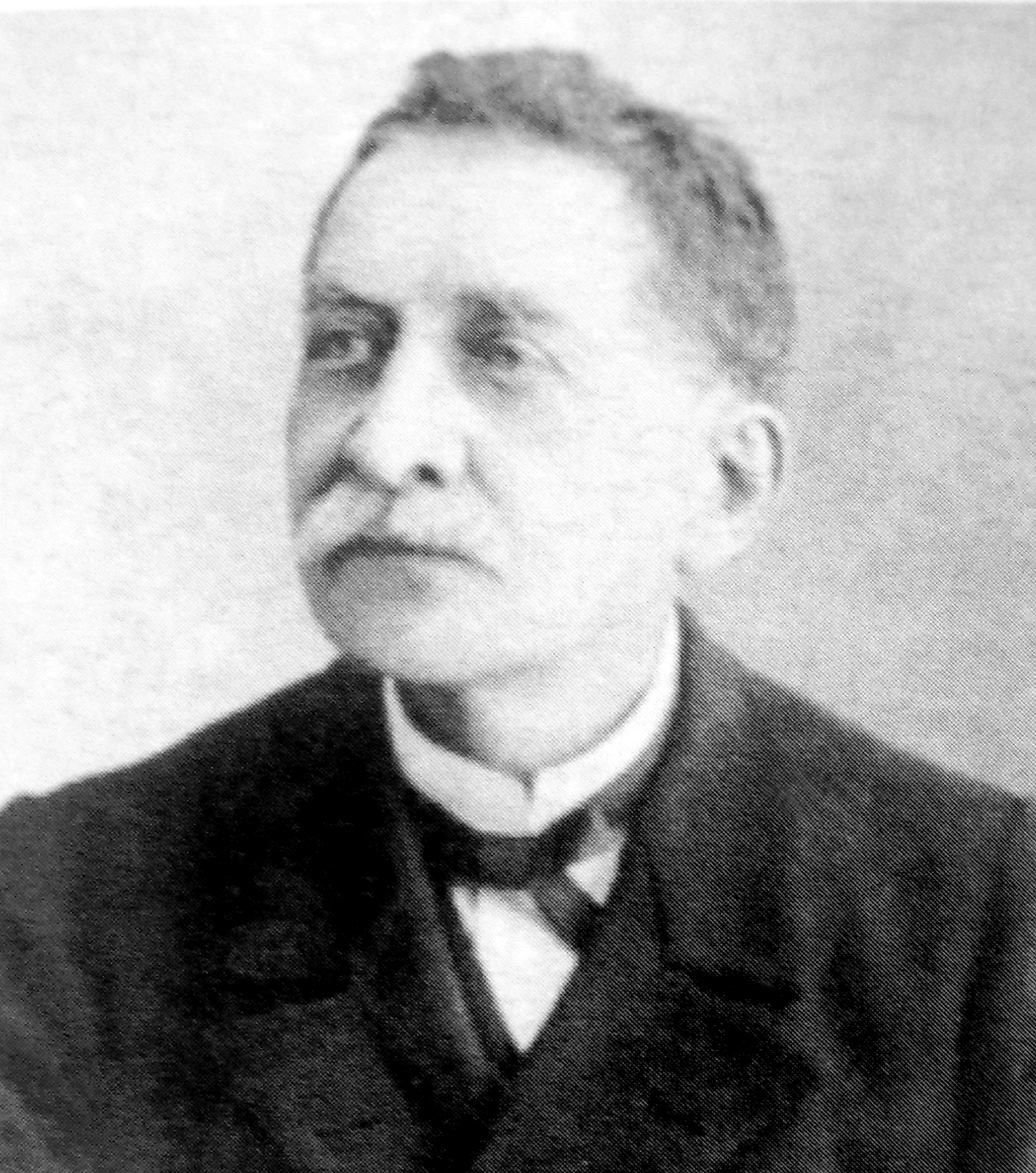
- Born: Paul Marie Viollet; 24 October 1840; Tours, France
- Died: 22 November 1914 (aged 74); Paris, France
- Occupation: Historian

Paul Marie Viollet (24 October 1840 – 22 November 1914) was a French historian.

== Life ==
After serving his native city as secretary and archivist, he became archivist at the Archives impériales in Paris in 1866, and later librarian to the faculty of law. On June 7, 1890, he was appointed professor of civil and canon law at the École Nationale des Chartes. His work mainly concerned the history of law and institutions, and on this subject he published two scholarly books Droit public: Histoire des institutions politiques et administratives de la France (1890–98), and Précis de l'histoire du droit français (1886).
