= List of English-translated volumes of Découvertes Gallimard =

Rows 1 and 3: New Horizons; rows 2 and 4: Abrams Discoveries.

Découvertes Gallimard is a French encyclopaedic collection of illustrated pocket books published by Éditions Gallimard since 1986. Books of this collection have been selectively translated into English. London-based publisher Thames & Hudson launched its first English-translated titles in 1992, under the title ‘New Horizons’ series. Harry N. Abrams of New York City produces the collection in United States under the title "Abrams Discoveries" series.

== List of English-translated volumes ==
- British version: 107 volumes;
- American version: 111 volumes.

English title (UK)	English title (US)	French title	Author	Translator	Publication date (UK)	Publication date (US)
The Search for Ancient Egypt	The Search for Ancient Egypt	À la recherche de l'Égypte oubliée (nº 1)	Jean Vercoutter	Ruth Sharman	18 May 1992	30 March 1992
Writing: The Story of Alphabets and Scripts	Writing: The Story of Alphabets and Scripts	L'écriture, mémoire des hommes (nº 24)	Georges Jean	Jenny Oates	18 May 1992	30 March 1992
Pompeii: The Day a City Died	Pompeii: The Day a City Died	Pompéi : La cité ensevelie (nº 16)	Robert Étienne	Caroline Palmer	18 May 1992	30 March 1992
The Vikings: Lords of the Seas	The Vikings: Lords of the Seas	Les Vikings, rois des mers (nº 13)	Yves Cohat	Ruth Daniel	18 May 1992	30 March 1992
Lost Cities of the Maya	Lost Cities of the Maya	Les cités perdues des Mayas (nº 20)	Claude-François Baudez, Sydney Picasso	Caroline Palmer	18 May 1992	30 March 1992
The Amazon: Past, Present and Future	The Amazon: Past, Present, and Future	L'Amazone, un géant blessé (nº 40)	Alain Gheerbrant	I. Mark Paris	18 May 1992	30 March 1992
Beethoven: The Composer as Hero	Beethoven: The Composer as Hero	Beethoven : La force de l'absolu (nº 106)	Philippe A. Autexier	Carey Lovelace	18 May 1992	30 March 1992
Van Gogh: The Passionate Eye	Van Gogh: The Passionate Eye	Van Gogh : Le soleil en face (nº 17)	Pascal Bonafoux	Anthony Zielonka	18 May 1992	30 March 1992
Gauguin: The Quest for Paradise	Gauguin: The Quest for Paradise	Gauguin : « Ce malgré moi de sauvage » (nº 49)	Françoise Cachin	I. Mark Paris	18 May 1992	30 March 1992
The Reign of the Dinosaurs	The Reign of the Dinosaurs	Le monde perdu des dinosaures (nº 69)	Jean-Guy Michard	I. Mark Paris	18 May 1992	30 March 1992
North Pole, South Pole: Journeys to the Ends of the Earth	North Pole, South Pole: Journeys to the Ends of the Earth	Le grand défi des pôles (nº 15)	Bertrand Imbert	Alexandra Campbell	18 May 1992	30 March 1992
The Life and Lore of the Elephant	The Life and Lore of the Elephant	Les Éléphants, piliers du monde (nº 93)	Robert Delort	I. Mark Paris, "Documents" translated by Carey Lovelace	18 May 1992	1 April 1992
The Search for Ancient Greece	The Search for Ancient Greece	La Grèce antique : Archéologie d'une découverte (nº 84)	Roland Étienne, Françoise Étienne	Anthony Zielonka	1 September 1992	30 October 1992
Newton: Understanding the Cosmos	Newton: The Father of Modern Astronomy	Newton et la mécanique céleste (nº 91)	Jean-Pierre Maury	I. Mark Paris	1 September 1992	30 October 1992
The Sky: Order and Chaos	The Sky: Mystery, Magic, and Myth	Le ciel, ordre et désordre (nº 26)	Jean-Pierre Verdet	Anthony Zielonka	21 September 1992	30 October 1992
The Aztecs: Rise and Fall of an Empire	The Aztecs: Rise and Fall of an Empire	Le destin brisé de l'empire aztèque (nº 33)	Serge Gruzinski	Paul G. Bahn	21 September 1992	30 October 1992
Rembrandt: Substance and Shadow	Rembrandt: Master of the Portrait	Rembrandt : Le clair, l'obscur (nº 76)	Pascal Bonafoux	Alexandra Campbell	21 September 1992	30 October 1992
Rodin: The Hands of Genius	Rodin: The Hands of Genius	Rodin : Les mains du génie (nº 44)	Hélène Pinet	Caroline Palmer	21 September 1992	30 October 1992
The Story of Jazz: Bop and Beyond	The Story of Jazz: Bop and Beyond	L'épopée du jazz 2/ Au-delà du bop (nº 115)	Franck Bergerot, Arnaud Merlin	Marjolijn de Jager	1 March 1993	15 March 1993
The Search for Ancient Rome	The Search for Ancient Rome	À la recherche de la Rome antique (nº 56)	Claude Moatti	Anthony Zielonka	29 March 1993	15 March 1993
Degas: Passion and Intellect	Degas: The Man and His Art	Degas : « Je voudrais être illustre et inconnu » (nº 36)	Henri Loyrette	I. Mark Paris	29 March 1993	15 March 1993
Volcanoes: Fire from the Earth	Volcanoes: Fire from the Earth	Les feux de la Terre : Histoires de volcans (nº 113)	Maurice Krafft	Paul G. Bahn	1 June 1993	15 March 1993
Monet: The Ultimate Impressionist	Monet: The Ultimate Impressionist	Monet : « un œil... mais, bon Dieu, quel œil ! » (nº 131)	Sylvie Patin	Anthony Roberts	21 June 1993	15 March 1993
The Exploration of Africa: From Cairo to the Cape	The Exploration of Africa: From Cairo to the Cape	L'Afrique des explorateurs : Vers les sources du Nil (nº 117)	Anne Hugon	Alexandra Campbell	21 June 1993	15 March 1993
Mozart: The Real Amadeus	Mozart: From Child Prodigy to Tragic Hero	Mozart : Aimé des dieux (nº 41)	Michel Parouty	Celia Skrine	1 September 1993	1 October 1993
Picasso: Master of the New	Picasso: Master of the New Idea	Picasso : Le sage et le fou (nº 4)	Marie-Laure Bernadac, Paule du Bouchet	Carey Lovelace	27 September 1993	1 October 1993
The Changing Universe: Big Bang and After	The Birth of the Universe: The Big Bang and After	Le destin de l'univers : Le big bang, et après (nº 151)	Trinh Xuan Thuan	I. Mark Paris	27 September 1993	1993
Shakespeare: Court, Crowd and Playhouse	The Age of Shakespeare	Shakespeare : Comme il vous plaira (nº 126)	François Laroque	Alexandra Campbell	1 October 1993	1 October 1993
The Celts: First Masters of Europe	The Celts: Conquerors of Ancient Europe	L'Europe des Celtes (nº 158)	Christiane Éluère	Daphne Briggs	25 October 1993	1 October 1993
The Story of Rock: Smash Hits and Superstars	The Story of Rock: Smash Hits and Superstars	L'âge du rock (nº 160)	Alain Dister	Toula Ballas	25 October 1993	1 October 1993
–	Gaumont: A Century of French Cinema	Gaumont, un siècle de cinéma (nº 224)	François Garçon	Bruce Alderman, Jonathan Dickinson	–	1 January 1994
The Story of Fossils: In Search of Vanished Worlds	Fossils: Evidence of Vanished Worlds	Les fossiles, empreinte des mondes disparus (nº 19)	Yvette Gayrard-Valy	I. Mark Paris	1 March 1994	1 February 1994
Ancient Greece: Utopia and Reality	The Birth of Greece	La Naissance de la Grèce : Des Rois aux Cités (nº 86)	Pierre Lévêque	Anthony Zielonka	1 March 1994	1 April 1994
Goya: Painter of Terror and Splendour	Goya: Painter of Terrible Splendor	Goya d'or et de sang (nº 7)	Jeannine Baticle	Alexandra Campbell	14 March 1994	23 March 1994
Vampires: The World of the Undead	Vampires: Restless Creatures of the Night	Sang pour sang, le réveil des vampires (nº 161)	Jean Marigny	Lory Frankel	1 April 1994	1 March 1994
Cézanne: The First Modern Painter	Cézanne: Father of 20th-Century Art	Cézanne : « Puissant et solitaire » (nº 55)	Michel Hoog	Rosemary Stonehewer	18 April 1994	1 February 1994
The Incas: Empire of Blood and Gold	The Incas: People of the Sun	Les Incas : Peuple du Soleil (nº 37)	Carmen Bernand	Paul G. Bahn	18 April 1994	1 March 1994
D-Day: The Normandy Landings and the Liberation of Europe	D-Day and the Invasion of Normandy	6 juin 1944 : Le débarquement en Normandie (nº 202)	Anthony Kemp	Originally published in English	16 May 1994	1 April 1994
Mummies: A Journey Through Eternity	Mummies: A Voyage Through Eternity	Les momies : Un voyage dans l'éternité (nº 118)	Françoise Dunand, Roger Lichtenberg	Ruth Sharman	1 October 1994	5 October 1994
Toulouse-Lautrec: Painter of the Night	Toulouse-Lautrec: Scenes of the Night	Toulouse-Lautrec : Les lumières de la nuit (nº 132)	Claire Frèches, José Frèches	Alexandra Campbell	3 October 1994	5 October 1994
Matisse: The Sensuality of Colour	Matisse: The Wonder of Color	Matisse : « Une splendeur inouïe » (nº 165)	Xavier Girard	I. Mark Paris	3 October 1994	5 October 1994
The Wisdom of the Buddha	The Wisdom of the Buddha	La sagesse du Bouddha (nº 194)	Jean Boisselier	Carey Lovelace	3 October 1994	5 October 1994
Angkor: Heart of an Asian Empire	Angkor: Heart of an Asian Empire	Angkor : La forêt de pierre (nº 64)	Bruno Dagens	Ruth Sharman	27 February 1995	1 February 1995
The Silent Gods: Mysteries of Easter Island	Easter Island: Mystery of the Stone Giants	Des dieux regardent les étoiles : Les derniers secrets de l'Île de Pâques (nº 38)	Catherine Orliac, Michel Orliac	Paul G. Bahn	1995	1 February 1995
Cinema is 100 Years Old	Birth of the Motion Picture	Cinématographe, invention du siècle (nº 35)	Emmanuelle Toulet	Susan Emanuel	27 February 1995	1 February 1995
The Cathedral Builders of the Middle Ages	Cathedrals and Castles: Building in the Middle Ages	Quand les cathédrales étaient peintes (nº 180)	Alain Erlande-Brandenburg	Rosemary Stonehewer	27 March 1995	1 February 1995
Manet: Painter of Modern Life	Manet: The Influence of the Modern	Manet : « J'ai fait ce que j'ai vu » (nº 203)	Françoise Cachin	Rachel Kaplan	27 March 1995	1 February 1995
Voodoo: Truth and Fantasy	Voodoo: Search for the Spirit	Les mystères du vaudou (nº 190)	Laënnec Hurbon	Lory Frankel	24 April 1995	1 February 1995
Renoir: A Sensuous Vision	Renoir: A Sensuous Vision	Renoir : « Il faut embellir » (nº 177)	Anne Distel	Lory Frankel	1 August 1995	1 October 1995
The First Humans: The Search for Our Origins	Human Origins: The Search for Our Beginnings	L'Homme avant l'Homme : Le scénario des origines (nº 215)	Herbert Thomas	Paul G. Bahn	23 October 1995	15 October 1995
The Irish Famine	The Irish Famine	L'Irlande au temps de la grande famine (nº 265)	Peter Gray	Originally published in English	30 October 1995	15 October 1995
The Garden: Visions of Paradise	Paradise on Earth: The Gardens of Western Europe	Tous les jardins du monde (nº 207)	Gabrielle van Zuylen	I. Mark Paris	30 October 1995	15 October 1995
Architecture of the Renaissance: From Brunelleschi to Palladio	Architecture of the Renaissance: From Brunelleschi to Palladio	La Renaissance de l'architecture, de Brunelleschi à Palladio (nº 242)	Bertrand Jestaz	Caroline Beamish	22 April 1996	30 March 1996
Charlie Chaplin: The Art of Comedy	Charlie Chaplin: Comic Genius	Charlot : Entre rire et larme (nº 245)	David Robinson	Originally published in English	22 April 1996	30 March 1996
How Weather Works: Understanding the Elements	Weather: Drama of the Heavens	Pleuvra, pleuvra pas : La météo au gré du temps (nº 227)	René Chaboud	I. Mark Paris	22 April 1996	30 March 1996
The Golden Treasures of Troy: The Dream of Heinrich Schliemann	Golden Treasures of Troy: The Dream of Heinrich Schliemann	L'or de Troie ou le rêve de Schliemann (nº 250)	Hervé Duchêne	Jeremy Leggatt	7 May 1996	30 March 1996
The Crusades and the Holy Land	The Crusaders: Warriors of God	L'Orient des Croisades (nº 129)	Georges Tate	Lory Frankel	7 May 1996	30 March 1996
Corot: The Poetry of Landscape	Corot: Extraordinary Landscapes	Corot : La mémoire du paysage (nº 277)	Vincent Pomarède, Gérard de Wallens	Lisa Davidson	10 June 1996	September 1996
Alexander the Great: The Heroic Ideal	Alexander the Great: Man of Action, Man of Spirit	De la Grèce à l'Orient : Alexandre le Grand (nº 27)	Pierre Briant	Jeremy Leggatt	23 September 1996	1 September 1996
Gandhi: Father of a Nation	Gandhi: The Power of Pacifism	Gandhi : Athlète de la liberté (nº 50)	Catherine Clément	Ruth Sharman	23 September 1996	1 September 1996
Underwater Archaeology: Exploring the World Beneath the Sea	Underwater Archaeology: Exploring the World Beneath the Sea	L'histoire engloutie ou l'archéologie sous-marine (nº 266)	Jean-Yves Blot	Alexandra Campbell	23 September 1996	1 September 1996
Knossos: Unearthing a Legend	Knossos: Searching for the Legendary Palace of King Minos	Cnossos : L'archéologie d'un rêve (nº 175)	Alexandre Farnoux	David J. Baker	7 October 1996	1 September 1996
Le Corbusier: Architect of a New Age	Le Corbusier: Architect, Painter, Poet	Le Corbusier : L'architecture pour émouvoir (nº 179)	Jean Jenger	Caroline Beamish	7 October 1996	1 September 1996
Cleopatra: From History to Legend	Cleopatra: The Life and Death of a Pharaoh	Cléopâtre, vie et mort d'un pharaon (nº 183)	Edith Flamarion	Alexandra Bonfante-Warren	1 March 1997	1 February 1997
Francis Bacon: 'Taking Reality by Surprise'	Francis Bacon: Painter of a Dark Vision	Bacon : Monstre de peinture (nº 287)	Christophe Domino	Ruth Sharman	24 March 1997	1 February 1997
Heraldry: Its Origins and Meaning	Heraldry: An Introduction to a Noble Tradition	Figures de l'héraldique (nº 284)	Michel Pastoureau	Francisca Garvie	14 April 1997	1 February 1997
Lewis Carroll and Alice	Lewis Carroll in Wonderland: The Life and Times of Alice and Her Creator	Lewis Carroll au pays des merveilles (nº 340)	Stephanie Lovett Stoffel	Originally published in English	2 June 1997	1 February 1997
King Arthur: Chivalry and Legend	King Arthur and the Knights of the Round Table	Arthur et la Table ronde : La force d'une légende (nº 298)	Anne Berthelot	Ruth Sharman	1 September 1997	1 September 1997
The Forbidden City: Heart of Imperial China	The Forbidden City: Center of Imperial China	La Cité interdite des Fils du Ciel (nº 303)	Gilles Béguin, Dominique Morel	Ruth Taylor	27 October 1997	1997
Leonardo da Vinci: Renaissance Man	Leonardo da Vinci: The Mind of the Renaissance	Léonard de Vinci : Art et science de l'univers (nº 293)	Alessandro Vezzosi	Alexandra Bonfante-Warren	10 November 1997	1 September 1997
Numbers: The Universal Language	Numbers: The Universal Language	L'empire des nombres (nº 300)	Denis Guedj	Lory Frankel	16 February 1998	1 September 1997
Khmer: Lost Empire of Cambodia	Khmer: The Lost Empire of Cambodia	L'Empire des rois khmers (nº 310)	Thierry Zéphir	Francisca Garvie	16 March 1998	1 March 1998
Mughal India: Splendours of the Peacock Throne	India and the Mughal Dynasty	L'Inde impériale des Grands Moghols (nº 320)	Valérie Berinstain	Paul G. Bahn	14 April 1998	1 March 1998
Chagall: The Art of Dreams	Chagall: The Art of Dreams	Chagall : Ivre d'images (nº 241)	Daniel Marchesseau	Ruth Taylor	30 June 1998	1 October 1998
Diamonds and Precious Stones	Diamonds and Precious Stones	Diamants et pierres précieuses (nº 336)	Patrick Voillot	Jack Hawkes	12 October 1998	1 October 1998
Our Prehistoric Past: Art and Civilization	Prehistoric Art and Civilization	Au cœur de la Préhistoire : Chasseurs et artistes (nº 295)	Denis Vialou	Paul G. Bahn	12 October 1998	1 October 1998
Ramesses the Great: Warrior and Builder	Ramesses II: Greatest of the Pharaohs	Ramsès II : Souverain des souverains (nº 344)	Bernadette Menu	Laurel Hirsch	1 January 1999	1 January 1999
Signs, Symbols and Ciphers: Decoding the Message	Signs, Symbols, and Ciphers	Langage de signes : L'écriture et son double (nº 67)	Georges Jean	Sophie Hawkes	18 January 1999	1 October 1998
–	Gustave Moreau: Magic and Symbols	Gustave Moreau : Maître sorcier (nº 312)	Geneviève Lacambre	Benjamin Lifson	–	1 March 1999
Standing Stones: Stonehenge, Carnac and the World of Megaliths	Megaliths: Stones of Memory	Les Mégalithes : Pierres de mémoire (nº 353)	Jean-Pierre Mohen	Dorie B. and David J. Baker	1 March 1999	1 June 1999
The Human Body: Image and Emotion	Images of the Body	Les images du corps (nº 185)	Philippe Comar	Dorie B. Baker, David J. Baker	18 October 1999	1 September 1999
The Search for Ancient China	The Search for Ancient China	La redécouverte de la Chine ancienne (nº 360)	Corinne Debaine-Francfort	Paul G. Bahn	18 October 1999	1 September 1999
Japan: The Fleeting Spirit	The Art and Culture of Japan	Le Japon éternel (nº 362)	Nelly Delay	Lorna Dale	18 October 1999	1 September 1999
Chardin: An Intimate Art	Chardin: An Intimate Art	Chardin : La nature silencieuse (nº 377)	Hélène Prigent, Pierre Rosenberg	Jane Brenton	21 February 2000	1 May 2000
The Pre-Raphaelites: Romance and Realism	The Pre-Raphaelites: Romance and Realism	Les Préraphaélites : Un modernisme à l'anglaise (nº 368)	Laurence des Cars	Francisca Garvie	17 April 2000	1 May 2000
–	Alchemy: The Great Secret	Alchimie, le grand secret (nº 302)	Andrea Aromatico	Jack Hawkes	–	1 May 2000
The Bronze Age in Europe: Gods, Heroes and Treasures	The Bronze Age in Europe	L'Europe à l'âge du bronze : Le temps des héros (nº 378)	Jean-Pierre Mohen, Christiane Éluère	David and Dorie Baker	3 May 2000	1 November 2000
Petra: The Rose-Red City	Petra: Lost City of the Ancient World	Pétra : La cité des caravanes (nº 372)	Christian Augé, Jean-Marie Dentzer	Laurel Hirsch; some documents translated by David Baker	8 May 2000	1 May 2000
Colour: Making and Using Dyes and Pigments	Colors: The Story of Dyes and Pigments	Les matériaux de la couleur (nº 383)	François Delamare, Bernard Guineau	Sophie Hawkes	27 November 2000	1 November 2000
Bonnard: The Colour of Daily Life	Bonnard: Shimmering Color	Bonnard : « La couleur agit » (nº 376)	Antoine Terrasse	Laurel Hirsch	12 February 2001	1 November 2000
Coptic Egypt: The Christians of the Nile	Coptic Egypt: The Christians of the Nile	L'Égypte copte, les chrétiens du Nil (nº 395)	Christian Cannuyer	Sophie Hawkes	1 June 2001	1 May 2001
Whales: Giants of the Seas and Oceans	Whales: Giants of the Seas and Oceans	Vie et mort des baleines (nº 2)	Yves Cohat, Anne Collet	Ruth Sharman	28 August 2001	1 November 2001
Charles Darwin: The Scholar Who Changed Human History	Darwin and the Science of Evolution	Darwin et la science de l'évolution (nº 397)	Patrick Tort	Paul G. Bahn	28 August 2001	1 November 2001
The Calendar: Measuring Time	The Calendar: History, Lore, and Legend	Le calendrier, maître du temps ? (nº 400)	Jacqueline de Bourgoing	David J. Baker, Dorie B. Baker	1 October 2001	1 November 2001
Vuillard: Master of the Intimate Interior	Vuillard: Post-Impressionist Master	Vuillard : Le temps détourné (nº 178)	Guy Cogeval		10 June 2002	11 June 2002
Gaudí: Builder of Visions	Gaudí: Visionary Architect	Gaudí : Bâtisseur visionnaire (nº 408)	Philippe Thiébaut		15 July 2002	1 April 2002
Alexandria: Past, Present and Future	Alexandria: Jewel of Egypt	Alexandrie : Hier et demain (nº 412)	Jean-Yves Empereur	Jane Brenton	5 August 2002	1 November 2002
The Invention of Photography: The First Fifty Years	The Invention of Photography	L'image révélée : L'invention de la photographie (nº 414)	Quentin Bajac	Ruth Taylor	7 October 2002	1 November 2002
Genghis Khan and the Mongol Empire	Genghis Khan and the Mongol Empire	Gengis Khan et l'Empire mongol (nº 422)	Jean-Paul Roux	Toula Ballas	1 May 2003	1 July 2003
Tibet: Turning the Wheel of Life	Tibet: An Enduring Civilization	Le Tibet : Une civilisation blessée (nº 427)	Françoise Pommaret	Barbara Mellor, David H. Wilson	6 May 2003	1 July 2003
Dalí: The Impresario of Surrealism	Dalí: Master of Fantasies	Dalí : Le Grand Paranoïaque (nº 453)	Jean-Louis Gaillemin	David H. Wilson	1 April 2004	1 July 2004
Graphics: A Century of Poster and Advertising Design	Graphic Design: A History	Le Design graphique (nº 439)	Alain Weill	Barbara Mellor	19 April 2004	1 July 2004
Aboriginal Australians: First Nations of an Ancient Continent	–	Les Aborigènes d'Australie (nº 428)	Stephen Muecke, Adam Shoemaker	Originally published in English	27 September 2004	–
J. M. W. Turner: The Man Who Set Painting on Fire	Turner: Life and Landscape	Turner : L'incendie de la peinture (nº 459)	Olivier Meslay	Ruth Sharman	23 May 2005	22 November 2005
Einstein: Decoding the Universe	Einstein: Decoding the Universe	Einstein : La joie de la pensée (nº 193)	Françoise Balibar	David J. Baker, Dorie B. Baker	23 May 2005	1 May 2001
–	Napoléon: "My Ambition Was Great"	Napoléon : « Mon ambition était grande » (nº 361)	Thierry Lentz	Laurel Hirsch	–	22 November 2005
Dada: The Revolt of Art	Dada: The Revolt of Art	Dada : La révolte de l'art (nº 476)	Marc Dachy	Liz Nash	10 April 2006	1 April 2006
Egon Schiele: The Egoist	Egon Schiele: The Egoist	Egon Schiele : Narcisse écorché (nº 475)	Jean-Louis Gaillemin	Liz Nash	5 March 2007	1 December 2006
The Pyramids of Giza: Facts, Legends and Mysteries	The Great Pyramids	Les Grandes Pyramides : Chronique d'un mythe (nº 501)	Jean-Pierre Corteggiani	Ruth Sharman	3 September 2007	1 November 2007
Frida Kahlo: 'I Paint my Reality'	Frida Kahlo: Painting Her Own Reality	Frida Kahlo : « Je peins ma réalité » (nº 512)	Christina Burrus		7 April 2008	1 April 2008
Henri Cartier-Bresson	Henri Cartier-Bresson	Henri Cartier-Bresson : Le tir photographique (nº 530)	Clément Chéroux	David H. Wilson	24 November 2008	1 November 2008
–	Marilyn: The Last Goddess	Marilyn : La dernière déesse (nº 517)	Jerome Charyn		–	1 November 2008

Two English version books originally published by Éditions Gallimard.

English title	French title	Author	Translator	Publication date
Hair: The Long and the Short of It	Les vies du cheveu (nº 405)	Marie-Christine Auzou, Sabine Melchior-Bonnet	John Adamson, Heidi Ellison	2001
Skin: A Living Envelope	La peau : Une enveloppe de vie (nº 420)	Claude Bouillon	Alexandra Keens	2002

== Découvertes Gallimard Hors série ==
Two English version books from Découvertes Gallimard Hors série originally published by Éditions Gallimard.

- The Musée de l'Orangerie, Pierre Georgel, translated from the French by John Adamson, 2006, ISBN 2070781674.
- Élisabeth Vigée Le Brun – version anglaise, Geneviève Haroche-Bouzinac, 2016, ISBN 9782070177820.

== Documentary adaptations of Découvertes Gallimard ==
Production company: Trans Europe Film
Running time: 52 minutes

Available in English-dubbed version:

- Numbers: The Universal Language, adaptation of the book of the same name by Denis Guedj, directed by Philippe Truffault, original French version released in 2001.
- Leonardo da Vinci: The Mind of the Renaissance, adaptation of the book of the same name by Alessandro Vezzosi, directed by Jean-Claude Lubtchansky, October 2004 (original French version released in 2001).
