= King Arthur and the Knights of the Round Table =

King Arthur and the Knights of the Round Table can refer to:

- The legend of King Arthur and the Knights of the Round Table
- King Arthur and the Knights of the Round Table, a 2017 movie.
- King Arthur & the Knights of the Round Table, or simply King Arthur (TV series), a 1979 Japanese anime series
- King Arthur and the Knights of the Round Table, an alternate title for Howard Pyle's The Story of King Arthur and His Knights
- King Arthur and the Knights of the Round Table, a non-fiction book by Anne Berthelot
- The Myths and Legends of King Arthur and the Knights of the Round Table, an album by Rick Wakeman
