= Piersanti =

Piersanti is both an Italian surname and a masculine Italian given name. Notable people with the name include:

Surname:

- Cactus Pete Piersanti (1916–1994), American businessman
- Franco Piersanti (born 1950), Italian composer and conductor
- Umberto Piersanti (born 1941), Italian poet and writer

Given name:

- Piersanti Mattarella (1935–1980), Italian politician
