= Bertrand Jestaz =

French art historian

Bertrand Jestaz, 2 February 1939 in Fontainebleau, is a French art historian, specialized in French and Italian Renaissance and in French classical art.

== Biography ==
A student of the École Nationale des Chartes and the École du Louvre, he dedicated his archivist and palaeographer thesis to Jules Hardouin-Mansart (1962). After graduating from the École des chartes, he was appointed to the Département des objets d'art du musée du Louvre, then at the École française de Rome. As curator, he organized several exhibitions including (with Daniel Alcouffe and Colombe Samoyault-Verlet) Dix siècles de joaillerie française (Louvre, 1962), (with Michel Laclotte and Sylvie Béguin) L'École de Fontainebleau (Grand Palais, 1972–1973).

In 1980, he succeeded André Chastel at the Renaissance Art History chair at the École pratique des hautes études. Meanwhile, he was a professor at the Ecole du Louvre and at the École des chartes until 2003.

Jestaz was awarded the Prize XVIIe in 2009 for his biography of Jules Hardouin-Mansart.

== Main publications ==
- 1966: Le Voyage d'Italie de Robert de Cotte, De Boccard.
- 19771994: (collectif) Le Palais Farnèse, École française de Rome.
- 1984: L'Art de la Renaissance, Mazenod. ISBN 978-0-8109-1948-8.
- 1990: L'Hôtel et l'Église des Invalides, CNMHS-Picard.
- 1995: La Renaissance de l'architecture, de Brunelleschi à Palladio, collection « Découvertes Gallimard » (nº 242), série Arts. Paris: Gallimard.
  - 1996: Architecture of the Renaissance: From Brunelleschi to Palladio, 'New Horizons' series. London: Thames & Hudson.
  - 1996: Architecture of the Renaissance: From Brunelleschi to Palladio, "Abrams Discoveries" series. New York: Harry N. Abrams.
- 2003: (collectif) Art et artistes en France, de la Renaissance à la Révolution, Bibliothèque de l'École des Chartes, tome 161.
- 2008: Jules Hardouin-Mansart, Picard, 2 vol.
