= Guedj =

Guedj is an Algerian Jewish surname. Notable people with the surname include:

- Arnaud Guedj
- Denis Guedj (1940–2010), French novelist and professor
- Jérôme Guedj (born 1972), French politician
- Nadav Guedj (born 1998), French-Israeli singer and actor
