= Pierre Rosenberg =

French art historian, curator and professor

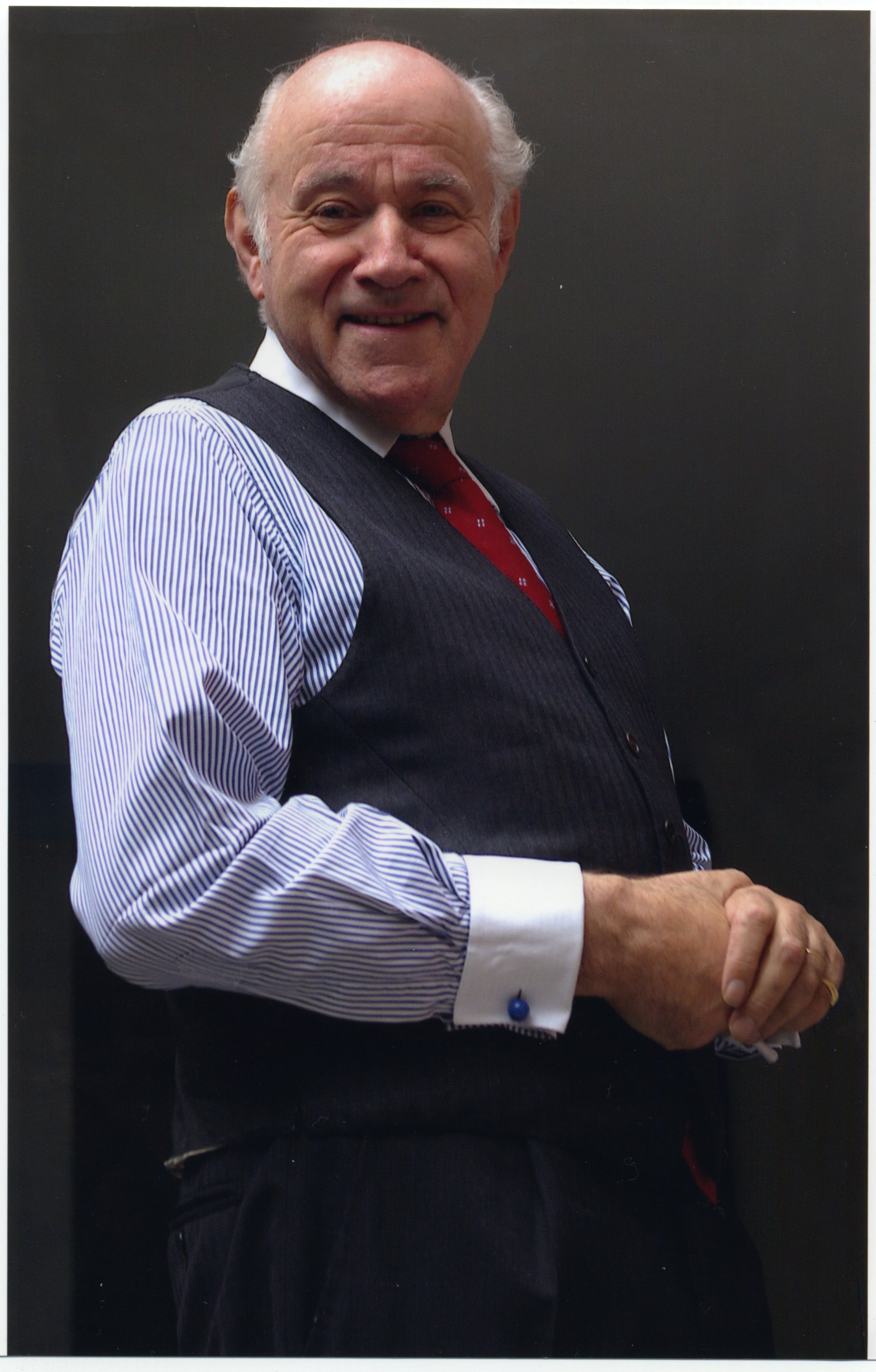
- Born: Pierre Max Rosenberg; 13 April 1936 (age 90); Paris, France
- Education: Lycée Charlemagne
- Alma mater: École du Louvre
- Occupation: Art historian
- Known for: Member of the Académie Française
- Spouse: Béatrice de Rothschild (m. 1981)
- Relatives: Alain de Rothschild (father-in-law); Éric de Rothschild (brother-in-law)

Pierre Max Rosenberg OMRI (born 13 April 1936) is a French art historian, curator, and professor. Rosenberg is the honorary president and director of the Musée du Louvre in Paris, and since 1995, he has held the 23rd seat of the Académie Française. He was Slade Professor of Fine Art at the University of Cambridge in 1987.

== Early life ==
Born in Paris into a Jewish family from Germany, Rosenberg grew up in Lot-et-Garonne and Gironde in southwestern France. He attended secondary education at the Lycée Charlemagne in Paris. He continued on to the École du Louvre, where he earned a law degree. In 1961, he was awarded the Henri Focillon Fellowship to study for three months at Yale University.

== Career ==
In 1962, Rosenberg joined the Department of Paintings at the Musée du Louvre as an assistant curator. In 1977, he was invited to study at the Institute for Advanced Study in Princeton, New Jersey. In 1987, he became Slade Professor of Fine Art at the University of Cambridge. After his promotion to curator, he later became director of the museum in October 1994 and served at this post until 13 April 2001.

Rosenberg was elected to the American Academy of Arts and Sciences in 1990 and the American Philosophical Society in 1997. On 7 December 1995, Rosenberg was elected to the Académie Française, replacing Henri Gouhier. He is also an honorary member of the Accademia delle Arti del Disegno of Florence.

Throughout his career, Rosenberg has published monographs on numerous seventeenth-, eighteenth-, and nineteenth-century French artists including Jean-Baptiste-Siméon Chardin, Jacques-Louis David, Jean-Honoré Fragonard, Laurent de La Hyre, Georges de La Tour, the Le Nain brothers, Jean-François Pierre Peyron, Nicolas Poussin (Pierre Rosenberg published the catalogue raisonné of Nicolas Poussin's paintings in 2026, Flammarion), and Jean-Antoine Watteau.

== Honors ==
- In 1995, Rosenberg, along with Louis-Antoine Prat, was awarded the Prize XVIIe for their catalogue raisonné on the drawings of David.
- In 1996, Rosenberg delivered the annual A. W. Mellon Lectures in the Fine Arts at the National Gallery of Art.
- In 1999, Rosenberg was awarded the honor of 2nd Class, Grand Officer of the Order of Merit of the Italian Republic.

== Personal life ==
In 1981, Rosenberg married Béatrice de Rothschild, the daughter of the late Alain de Rothschild. This was Béatrice's second marriage; she married Armand Angliviel de la Beaumelle in 1962, but Armand died only two years later. He was the stepfather of Marie Angliviel de la Beaumelle.

== Works ==
- Chardin, 1699–1779, 1979, ISBN 978-0910386487
- France in the Golden Age: Seventeenth-Century French Paintings in American Collections, 1982, ISBN 978-0870992957
- Fragonard, 1988, ISBN 978-0810909212
- Collab. with Renaud Temperini, Poussin : « Je n'ai rien négligé », collection « Découvertes Gallimard » (nº 233), série Arts, 1994, ISBN 2070532690
- Collab. with Hélène Prigent, Chardin : La nature silencieuse, collection « Découvertes Gallimard » (nº 377), série Arts, 1999, ISBN 2070534847
  - Chardin: An Intimate Art, 'New Horizons' series, 2000
  - Chardin: An Intimate Art, "Abrams Discoveries" series, 2000
- Chardin, 2000, ISBN 978-0300083484
- From Drawing to Painting: Poussin, Watteau, Fragonard, David, and Ingres, 2000, ISBN 978-0691009186
- Only in America: 100 European Masterpieces in American Museums, 2006, ISBN 978-8876246623

Preceded by Michel Laclotte	Président-Directeur; Musée du Louvre; 1994–2001	Succeeded by Henri Loyrette
