= Holly Block =

American museum and art gallery director

- Born: December 24, 1958
- Died: October 6, 2017 (aged 58)
- Education: Bennington College
- Employer: Bronx Museum of the Arts

Holly Block (December 24, 1958 – October 6, 2017) was an American museum and art gallery director.

== Biography ==
Block was born on Christmas Eve 1958 in Princeton, New Jersey, and was named for the celebration's traditional flora. She grew up mostly in Washington, D.C., and attended the Georgetown Day School. She received a bachelor's degree in photography and sculpture from Bennington College in Bennington, Vermont, in 1980. After college she returned to the District of Columbia and went to work for the Washington Project for the Arts, eventually becoming its project coordinator.

Block came to New York City in 1983, after working with Colab on the Ritz Hotel Project. From 1988 until 2004 she was the director of the alternative Tribeca art space Art in General.

She is perhaps best-remembered for her time as executive director of the Bronx Museum of the Arts. Block was the executive director of the museum from 2006 until her death in 2017 and during that span instituted free admission and quadrupled the number of visitors to the institution. In 2013 the Bronx Museum was chosen by the State department to do the American pavilion at the Venice Biennale which in turn chose an exhibition of work by Sarah Sze co-curated by Block and Carey Lovelace.

Her portrait is included in the series of Female museum art director by artist Amy Chaiklin.
