= Société d'étude du XVIIe siècle =

French learned society

The Société d'étude du XVIIe is a French learned society established in Paris in 1948 along the status of an association loi de 1901 in order to bring together specialists (historians, literary historians, art historians ...) of this period and to develop studies on this century.

== The society ==
The society was established in 1948 by Georges Mongrédien, Monseigneur Marius-Henri Guervin and E. Houdart de La Motte.

=== List of presidents ===
- 1948-? : Georges Mongrédien (1901–1980).
- 1978–1984: Jean Mesnard.
- 1985–1989: Jacques Truchet.
- 1990–1996 : Nicole Ferrier-Caverivière.
- 1997–2002: Jean-Robert Armogathe.
- 2002–2009: Yves-Marie Bercé.
- 2009–2015: Jean-Marie Constant
- 2015–...: Jean-Robert Armogathe

=== The prize XVIIe ===
Each year since 1984 the Society bestows a prize for the most significant work of the previous year, covering the seventeenth and which may be an audiovisual work.

- 1985: Jean-Pierre Labatut, Louis XIV, roi de gloire, Paris, éditions de l’Imprimerie nationale, ISBN 2110808055, 9782110808059.
- 1986: Michel Duchein, Jacques Ier Stuart, roi de la paix, Presses de la Renaissance
- 1987: Cornelis de Waard and Armand Beaulieu, Correspondance du père Marin Mersenne, vol. XVI, Paris, presses du CNRS.
- 1988: Georges Couton, edition of the Œuvres complètes de Corneille, Gallimard, bibliothèque de la Pléiade and Marc Minkowski, recording of Lully-Molière : Les Comédies ballets par les Musiciens du Louvre, éditions Erato.
- 1989: Dirk Van der Cruysse, Madame Palatine, Fayard.
- 1990: Jean-Dominique de La Rochefoucauld, Richelieu ou la Journée des dupes, création cinématographique.
- 1991: Lucile and Bartolomé Bennassar, Les Chrétiens d’Allah : L'Histoire extraordinaire des renégats, XVIe–XVIIe, Librairie académique Perrin.
- 1992: John Huxtable Elliott, Richelieu et Olivarès, P.U.F. ISBN 2130428770, 9782130428770.
- 1993: Madeleine Foisil, La Vie quotidienne sous Louis XIII, Hachette.
- 1994: Franck Lessay, critical editions and translations of Hérésie et histoire and De la liberté et de la nécessité de Thomas Hobbes, Paris, éditions Vrin.
- 1995: Louis-Antoine Prat and Pierre Rosenberg, Catalogue raisonné des dessins de Poussin, Milan, éditions Léonardo.
- 1996: Constance Cagnat, La Mort classique : Écrire la mort dans la littérature française en prose de la seconde moitié du XVIIe, Paris, éditions Honoré Champion ISBN 9782852034761
- 1997: Simone Herry, Une ville en mutation : Strasbourg au tournant du Grand Siècle, Presses universitaires de Strasbourg,ISBN 2868206603, 9782868206602
- 1998: Emmanuel Coquery (commissaire), Visages du grand siècle : Le Portrait français sous le règne de Louis XIV, Somogy, collective work published on the occasion of the Nantes and Toulouse exhibitions
- 1999: Alexandra Lapierre, Artemisia : Un duel pour l'immortalité, Robert Laffont
- 2000: Georges Forestier, critical edition of the Œuvres complètes, vol.1: Théâtre-Poésie by Racine, Gallimard.
- 2001: Olivier Chaline, La Bataille de la Montagne Blanche, 8 novembre 1620 : Un mystique chez les guerriers, Noesis.
- 2002: Delphine Denis, Le Parnasse galant : Institution d’une catégorie littéraire au XVIIe, Honoré Champion.
- 2003: Pierre Blet, Les Nonces du roi à la cour de Louis XIV, Perrin ISBN 2262018154, 9782262018153.
- 2004: Jean-Marc Châtelain, La Bibliothèque de l'honnête homme, BnF
- 2005: Jean Lesaulnier and Antony McKenna (dir.), Dictionnaire de Port-Royal, Honoré Champion.
- 2006: Jean-Robert Armogathe, L’Antéchrist à l’âge classique : Exégèse et politique, Mille et une nuits
- 2007: Hubert Bost, Pierre Bayle, Fayard
- 2008: Benoist Pierre, Le Père Joseph : L’Éminence grise de Richelieu, Perrin.
- 2009: Bertrand Jestaz, Jules Hardouin-Mansart, Picard.
- 2010: Chantal Grell, Anne d'Autriche, infante d'Espagne et reine de France, Perrin, 2009.
- 2010: Gilles Siouffi, Le Génie de la langue française : Études sur les structures imaginaires de la description linguistique à l'âge classique, Honoré Champion, ISBN 978-2-7453-1943-2.
- 2012: Dominique Descotes, La Logique de Port-Royal, Champion, 2011.
- 2013: Isabelle Landy-Houillon, Entre philologie et linguistique : Approches de la langue classique, Garnier, 2012.
- 2014: Sophie Vergnes, Les Frondeuses : Une révolte au féminin (1643-1661), Seyssel, Éditions Champ Vallon, 2013.
- 2015: Nathalie Lecomte, Entre cours et jardins d’illusions. Le ballet en Europe (1515-1715), Paris, Centre national de la danse, 2014.

== XVIIe, reference journal ==
Four times a year since 1949, the Society publishes the journal XVIIe ISSN 0012-4273, the main scientific journal on the 17th century, in an interdisciplinary setting. Since 2001, summaries, abstracts and articles have been available online.

It is considered a review of rank A by the ERIH (European Reference Index for Humanities).
