= Robert Étienne =

French historian and classical archaeologist

- Born: 18 January 1921; Mérignac, France
- Died: 9 January 2009 (aged 87); Bordeaux, France
- Occupations: Historian; University

Robert Étienne (French pronunciation: [ʁɔbɛʁ etjɛn]; 18 January 1921 – 9 January 2009) was a 20th-century French historian of ancient Rome.

== Career ==
A student of the École Normale Supérieure and agrégé of history, Robert Étienne was member of the École française de Rome from 1947 to 1949. In 1958, he defended a doctoral thesis on the imperial cult in the Iberian Peninsula from Augustus to Diocletian.

Apart from a passage at the CNRS as research attaché, he spent his entire career at the University of Bordeaux as an assistant, lecturer and teacher. He headed the Centre Pierre Paris, a unit associated with the CNRS and the French mission in Portugal.

Robert Étienne won the Prix Broquette-Gonin of the Académie française in 1962 and the Prix Thérouanne of the same Académie in 1967.

In 1988 he was elected corresponding member of the Académie des Inscriptions et Belles-Lettres and full member in 1999.

== Publications ==
- 1958: Le culte impérial dans la Péninsule ibérique d'Auguste à Dioclétien, Paris, BEFAR,
- 1960: Le quartier Nord-Est de Volubilis
- 1962: Bordeaux antique (in collaboration with P. Barrère)
- 1966: La vie quotidienne à Pompéi, ISBN 2010153375.
- 1970: Le siècle d'Auguste
- 1973: Les Ides de Mars : l'assassinat de César ou de la dictature ?
- 1986: Ausone ou les ambitions d'un notable aquitain
- 1987: Pompéi : La cité ensevelie, collection « Découvertes Gallimard » (nº 16), série Archéologie. Paris: Éditions Gallimard, new edition in 2009
  - Trad. into English by Caroline Palmer – Pompeii: The Day a City Died, "Abrams Discoveries" (New York: Harry N. Abrams) & 'New Horizons' (London: Thames & Hudson), 1992
- 1997: Jules César, Paris
