= Peter Gray (historian, born 1965) =

Irish academic

Peter Gray (born 1965) is Professor of Modern Irish History at Queen's University Belfast. He specializes in the history of British-Irish relations in the 19th century, particularly the Great Irish Famine.

He is a member of the International Network of Irish Famine Studies, and a member of the Irish Association of Professional Historians. Gray was Head of the School of History and Anthropology and Professor of Modern Irish History at Queen's University Belfast from 2010 to 2015. In 2015 Gray was an Eaton Visitor Fellow at the University of New Brunswick, researching the impact of the Great Famine on New Brunswick.

== Works ==
Professor Donald MacRaild of the University of Ulster called Famine, Land and Politics "by far the best book written on the Famine".

=== Books ===
- The Irish Famine, “Abrams Discoveries” series (New York: Harry N. Abrams, 1995).
  - British edition – The Irish Famine, ‘New Horizons’ series (London: Thames & Hudson, 1995)
  - Trad. into French by Pascale Froment – L'Irlande au temps de la grande famine, collection « Découvertes Gallimard » (nº 265), série Histoire (Paris: Gallimard, 1995).
  - Trad. into simplified Chinese by Shao Ming and Liu Yüning – Ai er lan da ji huang, "Fa xian zhi lü" series (vol. 81) (Shanghai: Shanghai People's Publishing House, 2005).
- Famine, Land and Politics: British Government and Irish Society, 1843-50 (Dublin, Irish Academic Press, 1999).
- The Irish Lord Lieutenancy: c. 1541-1922, Peter Gray and Olwen Purdue eds., (2012).
- The Memory of Catastrophe, with Kendrick Oliver (Manchester University Press, 2004).
- La Grande Famine en Irlande, 1845-1851. with Pauline Collombier-Lakeman (Paris: Editions Fahrenheit, 2015).

=== Articles ===
- "Punch and the Great Famine", History Ireland, Issue 2 (Summer 1993)
- "The Irish Poor Law and the Great Famine", Helsinki, 2006
