= Jean-Dominique de La Rochefoucauld =

- Born: 30 June 1931; 16th arrondissement of Paris
- Died: 2 February 2011 (aged 79); 14th arrondissement of Paris
- Occupation(s): Screenwriter; TV director

Jean-Dominique de La Rochefoucauld (30 June 1931 – 2 February 2011) was a French screenwriter and TV director.

In 1990, he was awarded the Prize XVIIe for his TV drama Richelieu ou la Journée des dupes.
