= Jeannine Baticle =

French art historian and curator

- Born: 1920
- Died: 24 December 2014 (aged 93–94)
- Education: École du Louvre
- Occupations: Art historian, museum curator
- Employer: Louvre museum

Jeannine Baticle (1920 – 24 December 2014) was a French art historian, and curator, She was the Honorary Deputy Director and Chief Curator of the Department of Paintings of the Louvre Museum, and a specialist in Spanish painting.

== Career ==
Baticle has devoted her entire career to the Louvre Museum and Spanish art. After completing the courses at École du Louvre, she started to work for the Painting Department of Louvre Museum as an assistant in 1945. She defended her thesis Le dessin espagnol au XVII^{ème} siècle : École de Madrid in 1947. She was appointed titular assistant in 1952 and conservator in 1962. She was also the director of the Goya Museum in Castres between 1980 and 1986.

She co-authored Histoire de la peinture espagnole : Du XIIᵉ au XIXᵉ siècle with Paul Guinard in 1950, then she organized several exhibitions both in France and abroad. In 1963, she collaborated with Michel Laclotte and Robert Mesuret to present the Trésors de la peinture espagnole dans les églises et musées de France at Musée des Arts Décoratifs, Paris. In 1970, she curated the exhibition Goya at the art museum Mauritshuis in The Hague, and then at Musée de l'Orangerie in Paris. The following year, she organised Eugenio Lucas et les satellites de Goya at Palais des Beaux-Arts de Lille and Goya Museum. She also curated in 1987 and in January 1988, the important retrospective exhibitions of Zurbarán at the Metropolitan Museum of Art in New York and Grand Palais in Paris, respectively.

Over the years Baticle has acquired a deep knowledge of Spain, about its history and customs, which allowed her to situate the works of painters in their social and political context.

== Selected publications ==
- Goya, d'or et de sang, collection « Découvertes Gallimard » (nº 7), série Arts. Éditions Gallimard, 1986
  - UK edition – Goya: Painter of Terror and Splendour, 'New Horizons' series. Thames & Hudson, 1994
  - US edition – Goya: Painter of Terrible Splendor, "Abrams Discoveries" series. Harry N. Abrams, 1994
- Zurbarán, Metropolitan Museum of Art, 1987, 2013
- Velázquez : Peintre hidalgo, collection « Découvertes Gallimard » (nº 73), série Arts. Éditions Gallimard, 1989 (new edition in 2015)
- Goya, collection « Sciences humaines », Librairie Arthème Fayard, 1992
