= Pierre Briant =

French Iranologist (born 1940)

- Born: 30 September 1940 (age 85); Angers, Maine-et-Loire
- Education: University of Poitiers
- Known for: From Cyrus to Alexander: A History of the Persian Empire
- Scientific career
- Fields: Iranian Studies
- Workplaces: Collège de France

Pierre Briant (born 30 September 1940 in Angers) is a French Iranologist, Professor of History and Civilisation of the Achaemenid World and the Empire of Alexander the Great at the Collège de France (1999 onwards), Doctor Honoris Causa at the University of Chicago, and founder of the website achemenet.com.

He studied history at the University of Poitiers (1960–1965). After teaching at the Lycée Joffre in Montpellier (1965-1967), he spent seven years as a lecturer at the University of Tours. He completed his doctoral thesis in 1972. Appointed Professor of the History of Antiquity at the University of Toulouse II-Le Mirail in 1974, he taught there for 25 years before becoming Professor at the Collège de France.

He has published extensively on the Achaemenid Empire, the history of Alexander the Great and his successors, as well as the Hellenistic Era.

In the words of Matthew Stolper, Briant "has shown a generation of scholars once isolated from each other that they are members of a common intellectual project of great consequence."

== Works ==
- Antigone le Borgne (Les Débuts de sa Carrière et les Problèmes de l'Assemblée Macédonienne) (1973) - doctoral thesis.
- Alexandre le Grand (1974, 2005)
- Rois, Tributs et Paysans, Études sur les Formations Tributaires du Moyen-Orient Ancien (1982)
- Etat et Pasteurs au Moyen-Orient Ancien' in Production Pastorale et Société (1982)
- L'Asie Centrale et les Royaumes Proche-orientaux du Premier Millénaire (c. VIIIe-IVe s. av. n. è.) (1984)
- "Pouvoir central et polycentrisme culturel dans l'Empire achéménide (Quelques réflexions et suggestions)", in Achaemenid History I: Sources, structures and synthesis (ed. Heleen Sancisi-Weerdenburg), (1987)
- "Institutions perses et histoire comparatiste dans l'historiographie grecque", in Achaemenid History II: The Greek sources (eds. H. Sancisi-Weerdenbur & Amélie Kuhrt) (1987)
- De la Grèce à l'Orient : Alexandre le Grand, collection « Découvertes Gallimard » (nº 27), série Histoire. Paris: Gallimard (1987; new edition in 2005, under the title Alexandre le Grand : De la Grèce à l'Inde)
  - Alexander the Great: The Heroic Ideal, 'New Horizons' series, London: Thames & Hudson (1996)
  - Alexander the Great: Man of Action, Man of Spirit, "Abrams Discoveries" series, New York: Harry N. Abrams (1996)
- "Ethno-classe dominante et populations soumises dans l'Empire achéménide: le cas de l'Égypte", in Achaemenid History III: Method and Theory (eds. A. Kuhrt & H. Sancisi-Weerdenburg) (1988)
- Darius : Les Perses et l'Empire, collection « Découvertes Gallimard » (nº 159), série Histoire. Paris: Gallimard (1992)
- Dans les Pas des Dix-Mille (ed) (1995)
- Histoire de l'Empire Perse. De Cyrus à Alexandre (1996) - in English, From Cyrus to Alexander: A History of the Persian Empire (2002).
- Darius dans l'Ombre d'Alexandre (2003)
- Lettre ouverte à Alexandre le Grand (2008)
- Alexandre des Lumières. Fragments d'histoire européenne (2012)
- Alexandre. Exégèse des lieux communs, Paris, Gallimard (2016)

== See also ==
- Cyrus the Great
