= José Frèches =

French novelist

José Frèches (born 25 June 1950, in Dax, Landes) is a French historical novelist with novels set in China.

His first trilogy The Jade Disk is a story, set during the Warring States period in disunited China. It tells the story of the character of the rich merchant and eventual prime-minister Lü Buwei - real father of the first emperor of China Qin Shi Huang. It portrays the struggles between the other kingdoms and Kingdom of Qin, destined to unite China.

His second trilogy The Empress of Silk is set in Medieval China during the Tang dynasty. It depicts the story of Emperor Gaozong, the third emperor of Tang and his prominent and ambitious wife Wu Zetian, who, after his death, virtually became the ruler of the country and the only ruling empress in the history of China.

His latest series The Empire of Tears is set in mid-19th-century China, at the time of the First and Second Opium Wars, when the Qing dynasty is struggling and slowly decaying.

== Bibliography ==
=== The Empress of Silk (L'impératrice de la soie) ===
1. The Roof of the World (Le toit du monde)
2. The Eyes of Buddha (Les yeux de Bouddha)
3. The Usurping One (L'usurpatrice)

=== The Jade Disc (Le disque de jade) ===
1. Celestial Horses (Les chevaux célestes)
2. Golden Fish (Poisson d’or)
3. Immortal Islands (Les îles immortelles)

=== The Empire of Tears (L'empire des larmes) ===
1. Opium Wars (La guerre de l'opium)
2. The Sack of the Summer Castle ( Le sac du Palais d'Été)

=== Novels ===
- Art & co (art & cie)
- Me, Buddha (Moi, Bouddha)
- Calling Center (Le centre d'appel)
- Once upon a time in China (Il était une fois la Chine)

=== Non-fiction ===
- Toulouse-Lautrec : Les lumières de la nuit, collab. with Claire Frèches, collection « Découvertes Gallimard » (nº 132), série Arts. Paris: Éditions Gallimard, 1991, new edition in 2019
  - Toulouse-Lautrec: Painter of the Night, 'New Horizons' series. London: Thames & Hudson, 1994
  - Toulouse-Lautrec: Scenes of the Night, "Abrams Discoveries" series. New York: Harry N. Abrams, 1994
- Le Caravage : Peintre et assassin, collection « Découvertes Gallimard » (nº 254), série Arts. Paris: Éditions Gallimard, 1995, new edition in 2012
