= The Parrot's Theorem =

Book by Denis Guedj

- First edition
- Author: Denis Guedj
- Original title: Le Théorème du Perroquet
- Translator: Frank Wynne
- Language: French
- Genre: Mathematical fiction
- Publisher: Weidenfeld & Nicolson
- Publication date: 1998
- Publication place: France
- English publication date: 15 June 2000
- Media type: Print (Hardback & Paperback)
- Pages: 416 pp (hardback edition)
- ISBN: 0-297-64578-1 (hardback edition)
- OCLC: 47023367
- Dewey Decimal: 843/.914 21
- LC Class: PQ2667.U3555 T4813 2001

The Parrot's Theorem is a French novel written by Denis Guedj and published in 1998. An English translation was published in 2000.

== Plot summary ==
The plot revolves around a household in Paris: Mr Ruche, an elderly wheelchair-using bookseller, his employee and housemate Perrette, and Perrette's three children – teenage twins and young Max, who is deaf. Max liberates a talking parrot at the market and Mr Ruche receives a consignment of mathematical books from an old friend, who has lived in Brazil for decades without any contact between the two.

The household sets up its own exploration of mathematics in order to crack the code of the last messages from Mr Ruche's old friend, now apparently murdered. Mathematical topics covered in the book include primes and factors; irrational and amicable numbers; the discoveries of Pythagoras, Archimedes and Euclid; and the problems of squaring the circle and doubling the cube.

The mathematics is real mathematics, woven into an historical sequence as a series of intriguing problems, bringing their own stories with them.

== See also ==
- Forrest Library
- Numbers: The Universal Language
