= Sylvie Patin =

French conservator-restorer (born 1951)

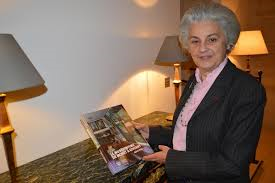
- Born: Sylvie Gache-Patin; June 11, 1951 (age 75)
- Education: Paris Nanterre University, École du Louvre
- Occupation: conservator-restorer
- Website: sylviepatin.free.fr

Sylvie Patin (born Sylvie Gache-Patin on 11 June 1951) is a French conservator-restorer of cultural heritage at Musée d'Orsay and art historian specialised in Impressionism.

== Career ==
Sylvie Patin was born on 11 June 1951. She has a degree in historical geography and a master's degree in history at the Paris Nanterre University, then she joined École du Louvre to continue her study.

She did a museum internship at the Musée Marmottan Monet in 1972 and passed the competitive examination of the musées de France in 1973. From 1974 to 1975, she was a trainee curator at Galerie nationale du Jeu de Paume and Musée de l'Orangerie, then a full-time curator from 1976 to 1980. She became curator of the Musée d'Orsay in 1980, chief curator in 1991, and finally a general curator in 2006. She retired in 2016.

In 2010, Patin curated an exhibition of Monet at the Grand Palais. She has published several books on the impressionist painter Claude Monet, such as Le Musée intime de Monet à Giverny (2016), a book presents the study of Monet's garden and house in Giverny; and Monet : « un œil... mais, bon Dieu, quel œil ! » (1991), a copiously illustrated pocket book belonging to the collection “Découvertes Gallimard”, which has been translated into seven languages, including English. On 20 September 2020, Patin was invited to a café littéraire based on her book Monet : « un œil... mais, bon Dieu, quel œil ! ». The meeting was organised in a former florist shop at the Place de l'Église of Illiers-Combray, during a book fair held in the commune.

== Publications ==
Publications by Patin

- In the Country: 19th Century Musée d’Orsay, Éditions Hazan, 1986
- Monet : « un œil... mais, bon Dieu, quel œil ! », collection « Découvertes Gallimard » (nº 131), série Arts. Éditions Gallimard, 1991, new edition in 2010
  - Monet: The Ultimate Impressionist, ‘New Horizons’ series, Thames & Hudson, 1993 (UK edition)
  - Monet: The Ultimate Impressionist, “Abrams Discoveries” series. Harry N. Abrams, 1993 (U.S. edition)
- Impression... impressionnisme, collection « Découvertes Gallimard Texto » (nº 4). Éditions Gallimard, 1998
- L’impressionnisme, La Bibliothèque des Arts, 2002
- Claude Monet au musée d’Orsay, RMN, 2004
- Le Musée intime de Monet à Giverny, Éditions Gourcuff Gradenigo, 2016
  - Monet’s Private Picture Gallery at Giverny, Éditions Gourcuff Gradenigo, 2016

In collaboration

- With Anne Distel & Michel Hoog, L’impressionnisme au musée du Jeu de Paume, F. Hazan, 1977
- AA.VV., Monet (Grand Palais Paris exhibition catalogue): 1840–1926, Harry N. Abrams, 2010
