= Ritz Hotel Project =

The exterior of 920 F St. N.W., Washington, D.C., November 2010, location of the Ritz Hotel Project in Spring 1983

The Ritz art exhibition was a collaboration between New York City's COLAB group and Washington, D.C.'s Washington Project for the Arts. The idea started when two groups collaborated to produce an event similar to COLAB's Times Square Show (1980), where the New York group occupied a building in the then-dilapidated red-light District that Times Square was in 1983.

== History and location ==
The Ritz took place in downtown Washington, D.C. in the Spring of 1983 at 920 F St., one block from the Martin Luther King Memorial Library. Artists removed the plywood covering the building's entrance and entered the space furnished with artworks and supplies, turning the abandoned residence hotel into a temporary museum.

After two weeks, the City prevailed by calling in the local Fire Department and condemning the building for safety violations, evicting all of the artists and securing the building.

== Significance ==
What is both remarkable and ironic about the Ritz Hotel show is that New York artists were apparently disappointed by the lack of political content in the work of Washington artists. Despite the presence of Washington Color School artists Gene Davis, Ann Truitt and Sam Gilliam. At the time, most of Washington's alternative culture was to be found on the city's independent music circuit and its primary venue was the 9:30 Club, just five doors away, then located at 930 F St. N.W.

Had the New York City artists stayed through the weekend, they might have discovered the city's DC HarDCore scene, which was explicitly political, featuring bands such as Minor Threat, Bad Brains, and Black Flag.

== Footnotes ==
- "The Ritz" (1983) was held in an abandoned flea-bag hotel in downtown Washington, DC,, 98Bowery.com, retrieved 11/2010
