= Christiane Éluère =

French Celticist

- Born: 1946 (age 79–80)
- Occupations: Celticist, curator, historian, archaeologist
- Notable work: The Celts: First Masters of Europe

Christiane Éluère (born 1946, known in English as Christiane Eluère) is a French curator of heritage, archaeologist and historian specialised in the history of the Celts.

== Career ==
Christiane Éluère is chief curator of the Center for Research and Restoration of Museums of France. At the National Archaeological Museum in Saint-Germain-en-Laye, she shares responsibility for the protohistoric collections. In 1987, she helped to organise the exhibition Trésors des princes celtes ('Treasures of the Celtic Princes').

She is the author of several books on European protohistory and the Celts. Her publications include Les Ors préhistoriques (1982), L'Or des Celtes (1987), Les secrets de l'or antique (1989) and L'Europe des Celtes (1992), a richly illustrated pocket book for Gallimard's "Découvertes" collection, which has been translated into eight languages, including English, and is often reprinted.

== Selected publications ==
- L'Or des Celtes, Office du livre, 1987
- Les secrets de l'or antique, La Bibliothèque des Arts, 1989
  - Secrets of Ancient Gold, Düdingen: Trio, 1990
- L'Europe des Celtes, collection « Découvertes Gallimard » (nº 158), série Histoire. Éditions Gallimard, 1992
  - UK edition – The Celts: First Masters of Europe, 'New Horizons' series, Thames & Hudson, 1993, reprinted 1995, 1997, 2000, 2004, 2010
  - US edition – The Celts: Conquerors of Ancient Europe, "Abrams Discoveries" series. Harry N. Abrams, 1993
- L'art des Celtes, Citadelles et Mazenod, 2004

=== In collaboration ===
- With Jean-Pierre Mohen, L'Europe à l'âge du bronze : Le temps des héros, collection « Découvertes Gallimard » (nº 378), série Histoire. Éditions Gallimard, 1999
  - US edition – The Bronze Age in Europe, "Abrams Discoveries" series. Harry N. Abrams, 2000
  - UK edition – The Bronze Age in Europe: Gods, Heroes and Treasures, 'New Horizons' series, Thames & Hudson, 2000
- AA.VV., Gods and Heroes of the European Bronze Age, Thames & Hudson, 1999
