= Andrea Aromatico =

Italian historian and expert in esotericism

- Born: 22 September 1966 (age 60); Urbino, Italy
- Education: University of Urbino
- Occupation: expert in esotericism
- Notable work: Alchemy: The Great Secret
- Website: www.andrearomatico.com

Andrea Aromatico (born 22 September 1966) is an Italian writer and expert in Hermetic iconography and esotericism.

== Career ==
Aromatico was born in Urbino, educated at the Faculty of Letters and Philosophy of University of Urbino. He is manager of the historical archives for the Region of Pesaro-Urbino, Italy. He has worked for various Italian public and private organisations and was responsible for a scientific exhibition dedicated to alchemy in Urbino in 1998. He has taught at the University of Perugia where he gave seminars and special courses. From 1999 to 2001, he was professor of art history at Ludes University of Lugano and was director of external relations at the same university since 2000. He has held conferences and seminars at numerous cultural centres and universities in Italy and abroad.

He collaborates with various magazines and is director of Secreta, a magazine of esotericism and mystery. As a television consultant, director and screenwriter, he has collaborated for years with Rai 2 and the programme schedules of the Seasons e Diana Web TV networks, of which he is currently the director. He is the author of Ottaviano Ubaldini, il principe filosofo e la rocca di Sassocorvaro (1993), Liber Lucis: Giovanni da Rupescissa e la tradizione alchemica (1996) and Alchimia: l'oro della conoscenza, a heavily illustrated pocket book belonging to the collection "Universale Electa/Gallimard", which has been translated into seven languages, including English. He has also authored a comic series entitled Nemrod, i cacciatori della Bestia 666.

== Alchimia: l'oro della conoscenza ==
Alchimia: l'oro della conoscenza
- Author: Andrea Aromatico
- Original title: Alchimia: l'oro della conoscenza
- Translator: Jack Hawkes
- Cover artist: Joseph Wright of Derby (IT & FR eds.); Basil Valentine, Matthäus Merian & Pietro Longhi (US ed.)
- Language: Italian
- Series: Universale Electa/Gallimard●Storia e civiltà
- Release number: 86
- Subject: Alchemy
- Genre: Nonfiction monograph
- Publisher: IT: Electa/Gallimard; FR: Éditions Gallimard; US: Harry N. Abrams
- Publication date: 1996
- Publication place: Italy
- English publication date: 2000
- Media type: Print (Paperback)
- Pages: 176 pp. (IT); 144 pp. (FR & US)
- ISBN: 978-88-445-0104-4
- OCLC: 644792844
- Preceded by: Urbi et Orbi: i papi nella storia
- Followed by: La Moda: usi e costumi del vestire
- Website: www.gallimard.fr/Catalogue/GALLIMARD/Decouvertes-Gallimard/Decouvertes-Gallimard/Culture-et-societe/Alchimie

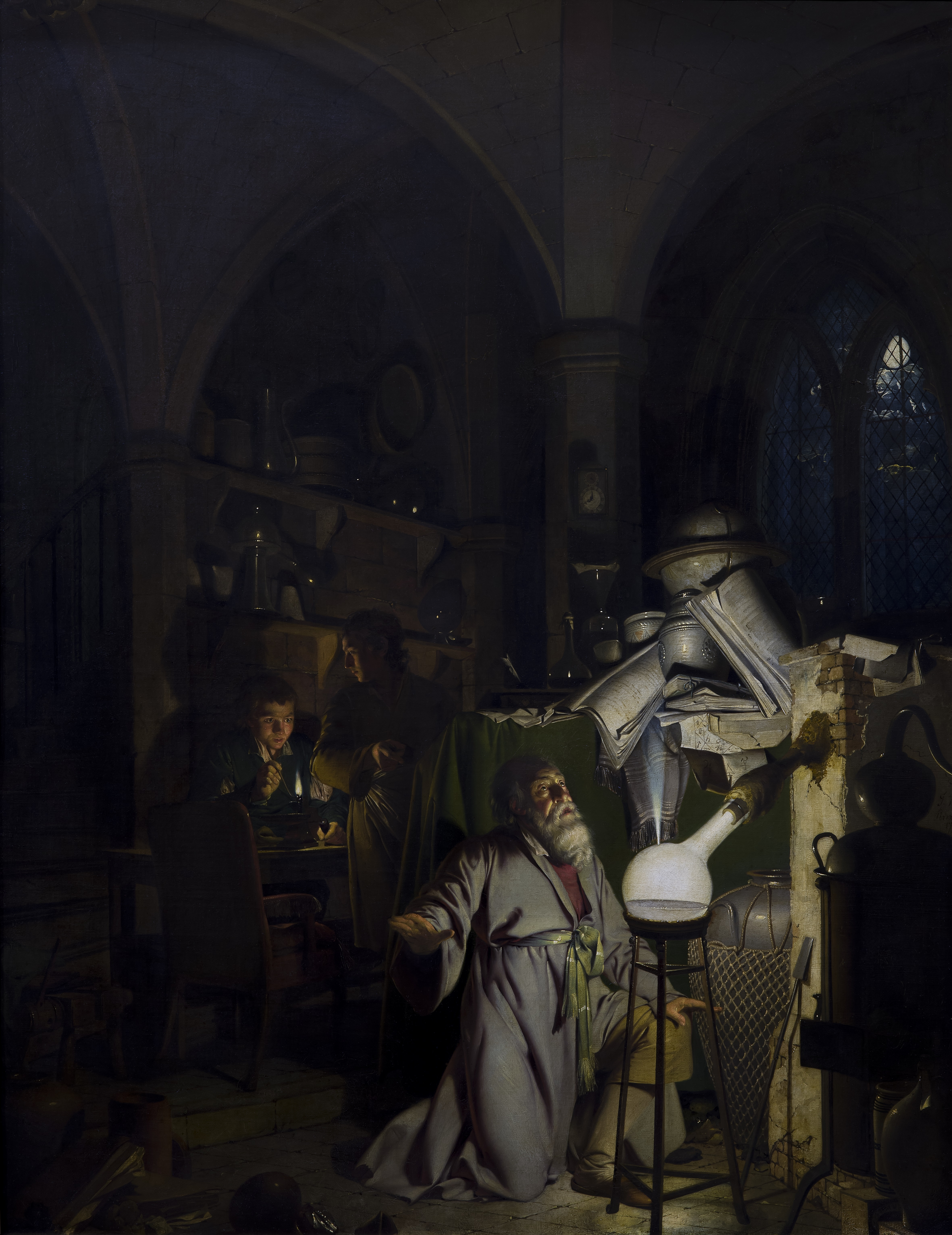
The Alchemist Discovering Phosphorus, cover image for Italian and French editions.

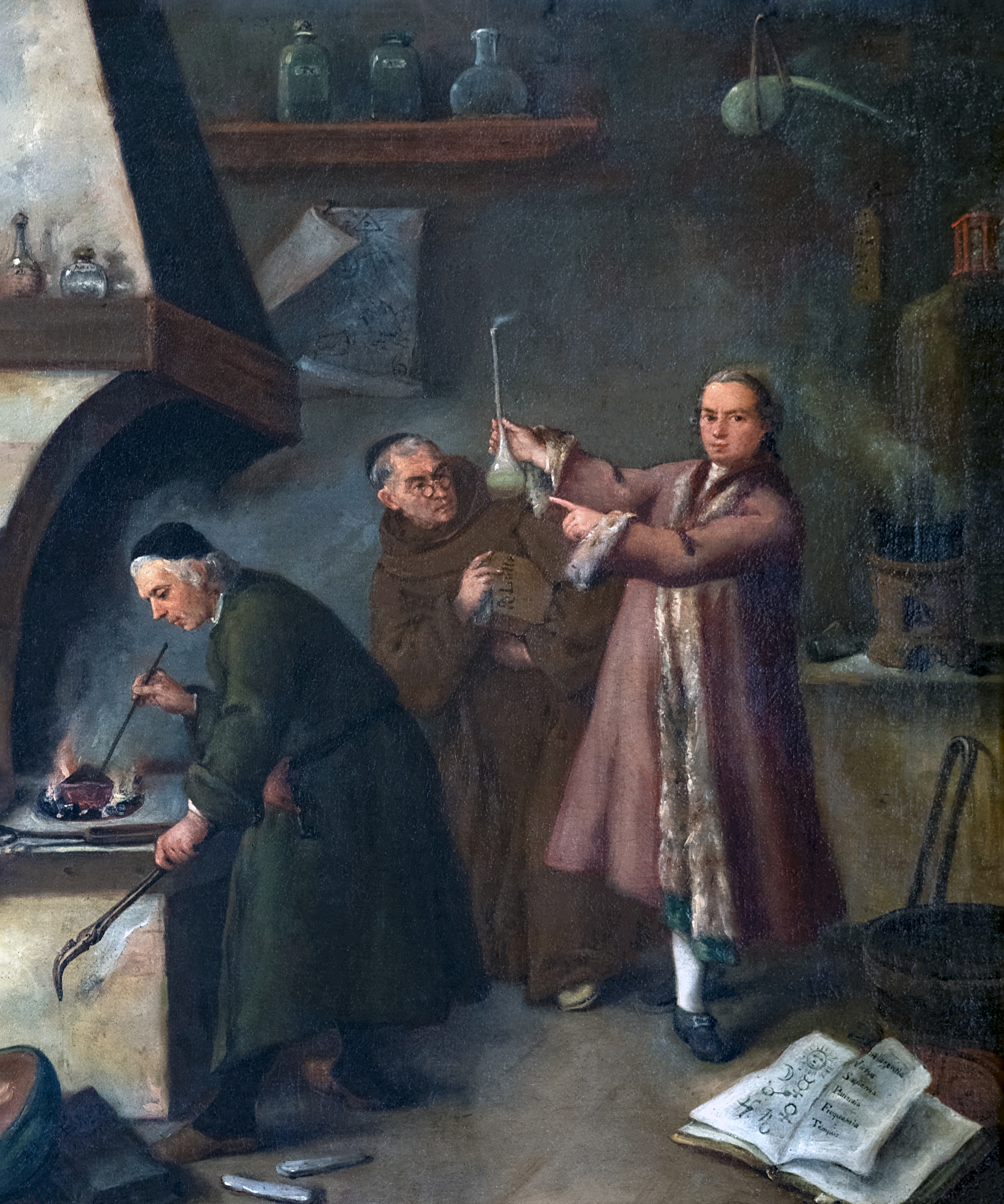
The Alchemists by Pietro Longhi, cover image for US edition.

The book Alchimia: l'oro della conoscenza (lit. 'Alchemy: The Gold of Knowledge') is part of an Italian collection "Universale Electa/Gallimard", published by Electa/Gallimard in 1996 in their Storia e civiltà series. The French edition—Alchimie, le grand secret—published by Éditions Gallimard, came out in the same year, but Gallimard shortened the "Documents" section at the back of the book. The English edition, entitled Alchemy: The Great Secret, is based on the French instead of the original Italian, was released in the United States in 2000, distributed by Harry N. Abrams in the "Abrams Discoveries" series. It is a pint-sized coffee table book, replete with colour plates, all well reproduced, with useful information in the captions. There are three chapters: I, "The Concept of Alchemy" (Lo spirito e la materia); II, "The Theory of Alchemy" (I maestri e la grande ricerca); III, "The Practice of Alchemy" (Il fuoco e la pietra filosofale). These are followed by a section of five "Documents" (Italian edition has ten (Note: The "Documents" section (Testimonianze e documenti) of Italian edition contains: 1, Genesi di un nome; 2, I miti delle origini; 3, I Maestri arabi; 4, L'Europa cristiana e l'età d'oro; 5, L'inizio della fine; 6, La clandestinità; 7, L'alchimia oggi; 8, Incontri eccellenti; 9, Dal caos alla luce; 10, Alchimia & Co. and a Tavola dei simboli alchemici (Table of alchemical symbols).)), which are excerpts taken from well-known texts on alchemy: 1, The earliest sources; 2, The medieval mystics and scientists; 3, The triumph of Hermetism in the Renaissance; 4, Alchemy in the modern era; 5, Alchemy in literature. There is a list of further reading, where is also included a number of English sources. The book closes with a list of illustrations and an index. It is the only work by Andrea Aromatico which has been translated into English, and other translations including Japanese, Polish, South Korean, Spanish and simplified Chinese, all of which are based on the French version.

The book opens with a series of reproductions of some elaborate images from Splendor Solis, accompanied by texts taken from the Emerald Tablet, the essential text of Hermetic philosophy, or alchemy, which was born of the oldest civilisations, and the transformation of metals has become one of the emblematic acts. But the search for "philosophers by means of fire" is not limited to the mere transmutation of lead into gold; it is indeed a philosophy, which most often takes the form of an "experimental metaphysics", and which has also given birth to a language—the Qabalah—and an extraordinary florilegium of images and symbols. Aromatico explores in the book this compound of science and myth, examining ancient texts and illuminated manuscripts to shed light on an enigmatic science of spells, ceremonies, and secret beliefs.

== Selected publications ==
- With Marcella Peruzzi, Medicamenti, pozioni e incantesimi del Ricetario Magico Urbinate, Roche, 1994
- Alchimia: l'oro della conoscenza, collection «Universale Electa/Gallimard» (nº 86), serie Storia e civiltà. 176 pages. Electa/Gallimard, 1996
  - Alchimie, le grand secret, collection « Découvertes Gallimard » (nº 302), série Culture et société. 144 pages. Éditions Gallimard, 1996 (translated from the Italian by Audrey van de Sandt)
    - Alchemy: The Great Secret, "Abrams Discoveries" series. 144 pages. Harry N. Abrams, 2000 (translated from the French by Jack Hawkes)
- With Umberto Piersanti, Il poeta e il cacciatore, Editoriale Olimpia, 2008
- La flagellazione: Il romanzo, i codici, il mistero, Petruzzi Editore, 2012
- Urbino itinerari turistici: Percorsi e vie, Arti Grafiche Stibu, 2013
