= Umberto Piersanti =

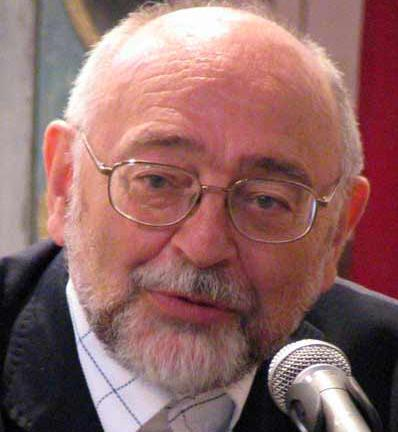
Image of Piersanti Umberto during a conference, is an Italian poet

Umberto Piersanti (born February 26, 1941) is an Italian poet, prose writer, professor of sociology of literature at the University of Urbino, in Italy, and editor of the literary revue Pelagos.

== Life and career ==
He was born in Urbino. During his writing career Piersanti published many poetry books and some novels and essays.

He made his debut in 1967 with the collection of poems La breve stagione; the melancholy preponderated in his juvenile poems, with Apennine nature, transformed into a mythical and classic place.

In Nascere nel '40 (1981) e Passaggio di sequenza (1986), Piersanti examined the historical and politic contest between 1960-1980.

He was a nominee for the Nobel Prize for Literature in 2005.

== Bibliography ==
=== Poetry ===
- La breve stagione (1967)
- Il tempo differente (1974)
- L'urlo della mente (1977)
- Nascere nel '40 (1981),
- Passaggio di sequenza (1986)
- I luoghi persi (1994)
- Nel tempo che precede (2002)
- L'albero delle nebbie (2008)

=== Anthologies ===
- Per tempi e luoghi (1999)
- El tiempo diferente (1999)
- Selected poems (2002)

=== Novels ===
- L'uomo delle Cesane (1994)
- L'estate dell'altro millennio (2001)
- Olimpo (2006)
- Co-author with Andrea Aromatico, Il poeta e il cacciatore (2008)

=== Essays ===
- L'ambigua presenza (1980)
- Sul limite d'ombra (1989)
- Il pensiero, il corpo (1986)
- Il canto magnanimo (2005)

== Filmography ==
- L'età breve (1969–70)
- Tre film-poemi (Sulle Cesane, 1982, Un'altra estate e Ritorno d'autunno, 1988)
- Un poeta e la sua terra (DVD on Umberto Piersanti, directed by Massimiliano Napoli, Librialice.it )
