= Serge Gruzinski =

French historian (born 1949)

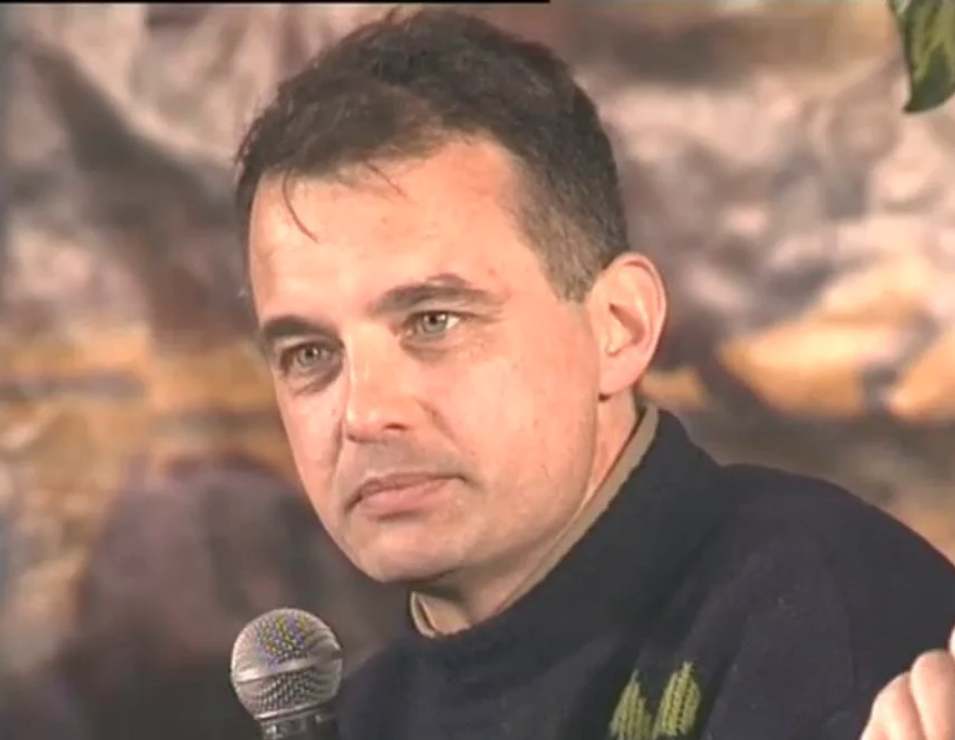
- Gruzinski in 1992
- Born: 5 November 1949 (age 76); Tourcoing, France
- Education: École Nationale des Chartes
- Occupations: Historian, Latin Americanist

Serge Gruzinski (born 5 November 1949) is a French historian. He is a Latin America specialist.

== Career ==
In 1969, he entered the École Nationale des Chartes and prepared a thesis on sixteenth-century Flanders under the direction of Pierre Goubert. In 1970, a trip to Mexico awakened his interest in this country. He was a member of the École française de Rome from 1973 to 1975 and the Casa de Velázquez in Madrid. In 1983, he joined the CNRS where he became research director in 1989. He is also the director of studies at the School for Advanced Studies in the Social Sciences since 1993.

Gruzinski is interested in the colonisation of the Americas and Asia, especially the colonial experiences like those cross-cultural areas, birth of hybrid spaces and first manifestations of globalisation. With Carmen Bernand, he published De l'idolâtrie : Une archéologie des sciences religieuses and two volumes of Histoire du Nouveau Monde. He is the author of Le destin brisé de l'empire aztèque, a richly illustrated pocket book from the collection "Découvertes Gallimard", which has been translated into nine languages, including English.

In 2004, he was curator of the exhibition "Planète Métisse" at the Musée du quai Branly.

In 2015, he won the International Grand Prize for History at the 22nd International Congress of Historical Sciences (ICHS).

== Selected publications ==
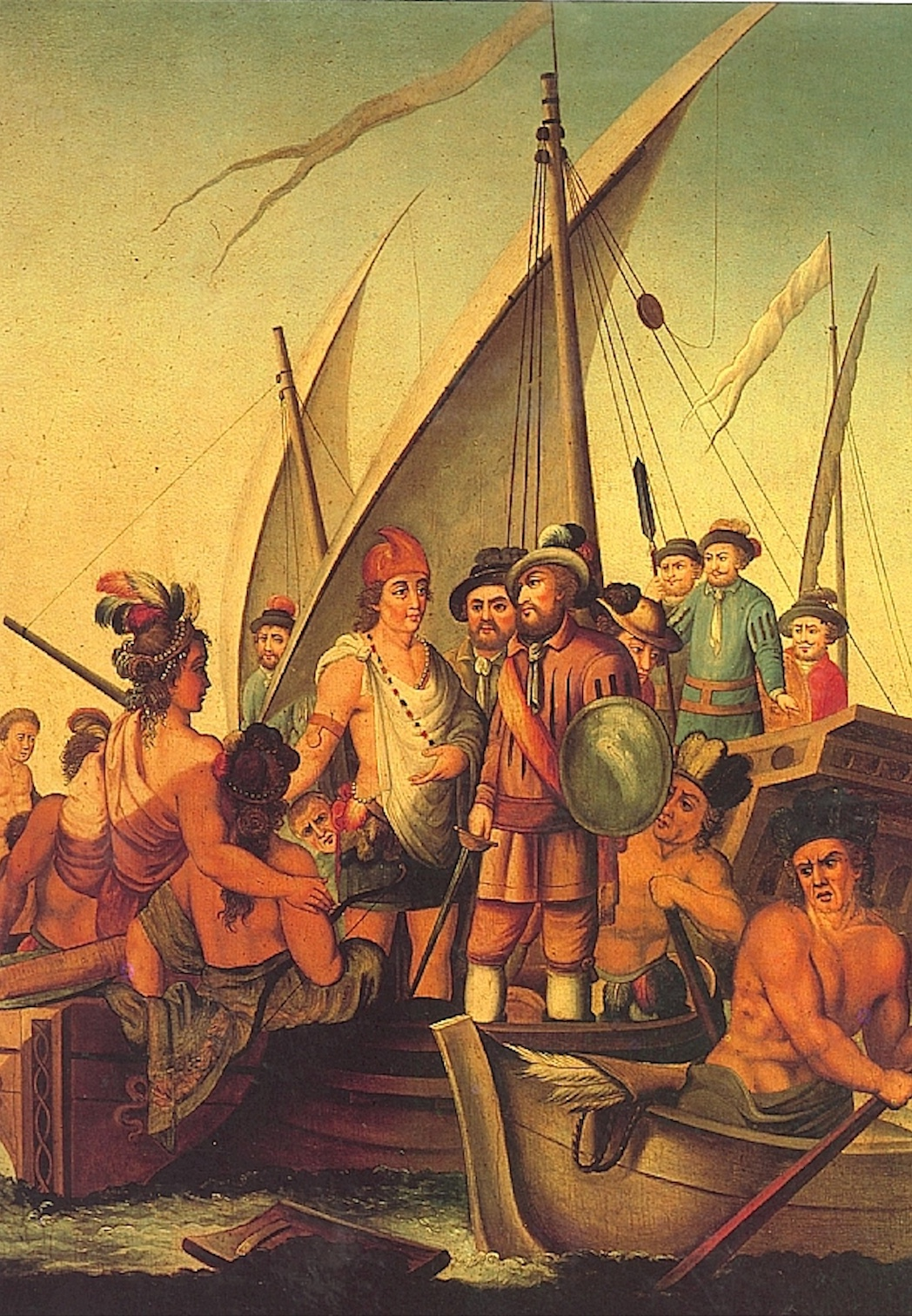
The capture of Cuauhtémoc, featured on the cover of Le destin brisé de l'empire aztèque.

- Le destin brisé de l'empire aztèque, collection « Découvertes Gallimard » (nº 33), série Histoire. Éditions Gallimard, 1988 (new edition in 2010)
  - US edition – The Aztecs: Rise and Fall of an Empire, "Abrams Discoveries" series. Harry N. Abrams, 1992
  - UK edition – The Aztecs: Rise and Fall of an Empire, 'New Horizons' series. Thames & Hudson, 1992
- Co-author with Carmen Bernand, De l'idolâtrie : Une archéologie des sciences religieuses, collection « Philosophie Générale ». Seuil, 1988
- La colonisation de l'imaginaire : Sociétés indigènes et occidentalisation dans le Mexique espagnol (XVI^{e}-XVIII^{e} siècle), collection « Bibliothèque des Histoires ». Éditions Gallimard, 1988
- Man-Gods in the Mexican Highlands: Indian Power and Colonial Society, 1520–1800, Stanford University Press, 1989
- Co-author with Carmen Bernand, Histoire du Nouveau Monde (2 volumes), Fayard, 1991 and 1993
- Painting The Conquest: The Mexican Indians and the European Renaissance, Flammarion, 1992
- Images at War: Mexico from Columbus to Blade Runner (1492–2019), Duke University Press, 2001
- The Mestizo Mind: The Intellectual Dynamics of Colonization and Globalization, Routledge, 2002
- The Eagle & the Dragon: Globalization and European Dreams of Conquest in China and America in the Sixteenth Century, Polity Press, 2014
- A History of Mexico City, University of California Press, 2019
