= Michel Laclotte =

French art historian (1929–2021)

Michel Laclotte (Saint Malo, France, 27 October 1929 – Montauban, 10 August 2021) was a French art historian and museum director, specialising in 14th and 15th century Italian and French painting.

== Early life and education ==
Laclotte's father, Pierre was a lawyer who died in 1940 fighting in the Second World War. His mother, Hugette (de Kermabon) took Michele and his sister to occupied Paris in 1941. He attended the lycée Henri-IV, then studied at the Sorbonne and the École du Louvre, and while still a student, began working at the museum as an intern in 1951. In 1952, he was appointed to lead a team to catalog works of art recovered or repatriated from looting during the war.

== Career ==
His first position was as inspecteur des musées de province from 1952, where Jean Vergnet-Ruiz was his mentor. In 1965 he was appointed by Culture Minister André Malraux as the chief curator of the paintings department of the Louvre, succeeding Germain Bazin. He was also a professor at the École du Louvre.

From 1972, he championed the idea of turning Paris's gare d'Orsay into a museum, now the Musée d'Orsay. From 1978 he led the team that worked on the future museum's curatorial program until its opening in 1986. He was also influential in the creation of the Musée du Petit Palais in Avignon, which opened in 1976.

He was involved in the Grand Louvre project from its inception in 1981, and defended the design choice of the Louvre Pyramid. He was subsequently appointed the Louvre's Director in 1987, and in 1992 became the first président-directeur of the newly created Établissement public du musée du Louvre, a position he held until his retirement in 1994. He also directed the Revue de l'art journal between 1988 and 1991.

Laclotte was also instrumental in the creation of France's Institut National d'Histoire de l'Art from 1995 to 2002, and led one of the new institute's main research projects, a catalogue of Italian paintings in French public collections, following its establishment in 2001.

== Main publications ==
- Histoires de musées: Souvenirs d'un conservateur (Scala, 2003) ISBN 2866563077. English translation, A Key to the Louvre: Memoirs of a Curator (Abbeville, 2004) ISBN 978-0-78920-820-0.
- L'art e l'esprit de Paris (SEUIL, 2003) ISBN 978-2-02-062410-7. English translation, The Art and Spirit of Paris (Abbeville, 2003) ISBN 978-1-55859-760-0
- L'école d'Avignon (Flammarion, 1983) ISBN 9782080120168.

He was also a contributor to many books on the history of painting, including

- Exposition de peinture hollandaise provenant ... du Musée du Louvre (exposition, musée de Tourcoing, décembre 1953), Tourcoing : Musée, 1953
- De Giotto à Bellini : les primitifs italiens dans les musées de France (exposition, Paris, musée de l'Orangerie, 1956), Paris: Éditions des Musées nationaux, 1956
- (avec Ch. Sterling, O. Raggio, S. Béguin) Exposition de la collection Robert Lehman (Paris, musée de l'Orangerie, 1957), Paris: Éd. des musées nationaux, 1957
- (préface de A. Blunt) The Age of Louis XIV (exposition, Londres, Royal Academy of arts, 1958), London: Royal Academy of arts, 1958
- Le XVIIe siècle français. Chefs-d'œuvre des musées de province, Paris: Les Presses artistiques, 1958
- L'Ecole d'Avignon: la peinture en Provence aux XIVe et XVe siècles, Paris: Gonthier-Seghers, 1960
- Trésors de la peinture espagnole: églises et musées de France (exposition, Paris, musée des Arts décoratifs, janv.–avr. 1963), Paris: Ministère d'État Affaires culturelles, 1963
- Primitifs français, Paris: Hachette [1966]
- Ingres (exposition, Paris, musée du Petit Palais, 27 octobre 1967–29 janvier 1968), Paris: Réunion des musées nationaux, 1967
- Musée du Louvre. Peintures, Paris: Flammarion, 1969
- (dir.) Dictionnaire des grands peintres, Paris: Larousse, 1970. Rééd. 1983, 1989, 1991.
- Avignon, Musée du Petit Palais: peinture italienne, Paris: Éditions des Musées nationaux, 1976
- (avec S. Béguin et C. Ressort) Retables italiens du XIIIe au XVe siècle (exposition, Paris, Musée national du Louvre, 14 octobre 1977–15 janvier 1978), Paris : Réunion des musées nationaux, 1978
- (avec J.-P. Cuzin) Petit Larousse de la peinture, Paris: Larousse, 1979
- (avec J.-P. Cuzin) Le Louvre: la peinture européenne, Paris: Éditions Scala, 1982
- (avec D. Thiébaut) L'École d'Avignon, Paris : Flammarion, 1983
- (collectif) Dictionnaire de la peinture, Paris : Larousse, 1987. Rééd. 1989, 1993, 1996, 1999, 2003
- (avec J.-P. Cuzin et S. Ottani Cavina), Mélanges en hommage à Pierre Rosenberg: peintures et dessins en France et en Italie, XVIIe-XVIIIe siècles, Paris: Réunion des Musées Nationaux, 2001
- (avec M. Phéline) L'art et l'esprit de Paris, Paris : Seuil, 2003
- Histoires de musées : Souvenirs d'un conservateur, Paris: Scala, 2003
- Mantegna à Mantoue, coll. « Découvertes Gallimard Hors série », Paris: Gallimard, 2008
- (collectif) Figures de la réalité : caravagesques français, Georges de La Tour, les frères Le Nain..., Paris: Hazan-INHA, 2010
- Dictionnaire de la peinture from Éditions Larousse (ISBN 2035053900)

== See also ==
- Charles Sterling
- André Chastel
- Pierre Rosenberg
- Henri Loyrette
