= Carey Lovelace =

American journalist

- Born: Los Angeles
- Occupations: Art journalist, playwright, and Curator
- Website: careylovelace.com

Carey Lovelace is an American art journalist, playwright, and curator based in New York. She is the founder of Visions2030.

== Early life and education ==
Lovelace was born in Los Angeles and grew up in Whittier, California. She studied theatre at Interlochen Arts Academy. At California Institute of the Arts, she received a BFA, majoring in ethnomusicology, music composition, and writing. She studied composition with James Tenney, Harold Budd, and Leonard Stein. She toured Europe with the mixed media avant-garde group Simultaneous Arts and Company, which specialized in musical installations in art galleries and museums. In Paris for two years, she studied contemporary music at the Paris 8 University and attended composition classes with Iannis Xenakis at Sorbonne University and Olivier Messiaen at the Conservatoire de Paris.

== Career ==
She is registered as a Broadcast Music, Inc. (BMI) composer. Lovelace co-founded the Independent Composers Association. She was a 2010 Affiliated Fellow of the American Academy in Rome.

=== Art journalist ===
Inspired by a workshop by John Cage, she moved to New York City and in 1981 enrolled in New York University’s graduate journalism program, where she received a master's degree. Her first article, "Painting for Dollars,” was published in Harper's Magazine. She continued writing about art for publications including the Los Angeles Times, The Boston Globe, ARTnews, Artforum, Ms., The New York Times, and the International Herald Tribune. She wrote regularly for Newsday from 1994 and 1997 and for Art in America from 2000 and 2009.

In 2003, Lovelace became co-president, with Eleanor Heartney, of the International Association of Art Critics' United States chapter, co-organizing a number of large-scale events including the 2005 National Critics Conference in Los Angeles.

=== Playwright ===
In the 1990s, Lovelace returned to theatre, getting an MFA in playwrighting from the Actors Studio Program at The New School. At Ensemble Studio Theatre (EST), she participated in labs under the direction of Curt Dempster. She had over 50 performances in theatres across the country. Couples Counseling, developed at EST, premiered at REDCAT in Los Angeles, and was performed at 59E59 Theaters in New York and at the Edinburgh Festival Fringe. Her work is featured in The Best Monologues from the Best American Short Plays: Volume One, edited by William W. Demastes.

=== Curator ===
In 2008, Lovelace curated Making It Together: Women's Collaborative Art and Community at the Bronx Museum of the Arts, exploring feminist visual art and performance collectives of the 1970s. In 2010, she curated Iannis Xenakis: Composer, Architect, Visionary with Sharon Kanach. The exhibition traveled to the Canadian Center for Architecture in Montreal, the Museum of Contemporary Art in Los Angeles, the Holland Festival in Amsterdam, and the Academy of Arts in Berlin. The United States Department of State appointed Lovelace co-commissioner, with Holly Block, for the United States Pavilion for the 55th Venice Biennale, with Sarah Sze as the featured artist.

=== Producer ===
In 2009, Lovelace co-founded the theatre company Loose Change Productions, focusing on transcultural theatre and performance that explores new moral and ethical territories. Its productions include Couples Counseling, Red Mother by Spiderwoman Theater, and Honour by Dipti Mehta.

=== Visions2030 ===
In 2019, Lovelace founded Visions2030, originally called 2020 Visions, devoted to harnessing artistic imagination to forge new models of society. Partnering with institutions like the Union Theological Seminary and California Institute of the Arts, Visions2030's initiatives to date have included Imaginator StartUp; The New City: Navigating the Future, a How-To; Collective Dreaming; The Lumisphere Experience; and Earth Edition: A Festival of Eco-Consciousness.
