= Anne Distel =

French curator (born 1947)

- Born: Anne Dayez; 19 February 1947 (age 79)
- Occupations: Museum curator, art critic

Anne Distel (born Anne Dayez on 19 February 1947) is a French honorary general curator of heritage at the Musée d'Orsay and specialist in Impressionist paintings. She curated notable exhibitions such as Large monographie Renoir, Cézanne et Un ami Van Gogh: Le Docteur Gachet, and Paul Signac (1863-1935) or The Mystery et l'éclat.

== Career ==
Anne Distel is professor of art history at Paris-Sorbonne University. She is the author of numerous books on nineteenth-century paintings. She is particularly interested in Pierre-Auguste Renoir, and was the curator of the monographic exhibition of Renoir which was presented at the Grand Palais in Paris in 1985. She organised a lecture, "Renoir and the Woman of Paris", at The Frick Collection art museum in 2012.

She authored Renoir : « Il faut embellir » (1993), a lavishly illustrated pocket book for the collection "Découvertes Gallimard", which has been translated into six languages, including English; and Renoir, a 400-page book packaged in a box set, published in English in 2010.

During an interview with Éditions Gallimard, Distel observed that collectors—for example, Albert C. Barnes—played a very important role in Renoir's life, and were the cause of evolution of his style. Barnes built a foundation to house his eclectic private collection in 1922. The foundation had a goal of education consistent with Barnes' very democratic ideas about the spread of culture.

Distel was nominated Commandeur of the Ordre des Arts et des Lettres in 2008.

== Selected publications ==
- Impressionism: A Centenary Exhibition, Metropolitan Museum of Art, 1974
- Impressionism: The First Collectors, Harry N. Abrams, Inc., 1990
- Renoir : « Il faut embellir », collection « Découvertes Gallimard » (nº 177), série Arts. Éditions Gallimard, 1993, new edition in 2009
  - UK edition – Renoir: A Sensuous Vision, 'New Horizons' series. Thames & Hudson, 1995
  - US edition – Renoir: A Sensuous Vision, "Abrams Discoveries" series. Harry N. Abrams, 1995
- Gustave Caillebotte: Urban Impressionist, Abbeville Press, 1995
- Signac, au temps d'harmonie, collection « Découvertes Gallimard » (nº 404), série Arts. Éditions Gallimard, 2001
- Renoir, Abbeville Press, 2010

In collaboration

- With John House and Lawrence Gowing, Renoir (Renoir Exhibition Catalogue), Harry N. Abrams, Inc., 1985
- With Claire Frèches-Thory, Geniève Lacambre and Sylvie Gache-Patin, Musee d'Orsay: Impressionism and Post-Impressionist Masterpieces, Thames & Hudson, 1993
- With Susan Alyson Stein, Cézanne to Van Gogh: The Collection of Doctor Gachet, Metropolitan Museum of Art, 1999
