= The Celts: First Masters of Europe =

1992 book by Christiane Éluère

- French cover. Detail from the Gundestrup cauldron (Denmark), 1st century AD, National Museum of Copenhagen. English editions featuring identical cover artwork.
- Author: Christiane Éluère
- Original title: L'Europe des Celtes
- Translator: Daphne Briggs
- Language: French
- Series: Découvertes Gallimard●Histoire (FR); Abrams Discoveries (US); New Horizons (UK)
- Release number: 158th in collection
- Subject: Celts, Celtic Europe
- Genre: Nonfiction monograph
- Publisher: FR: Éditions Gallimard; US: Harry N. Abrams; UK: Thames & Hudson
- Publication date: 10 November 1992
- Publication place: France
- English publication date: 1993
- Media type: Print (Paperback)
- Pages: 176 pp.
- ISBN: 978-2-070-53171-4 (first edition)
- OCLC: 27719510
- Preceded by: La guerre de Sécession : Les États désunis
- Followed by: Darius : Les Perses et l'Empire

The Celts: First Masters of Europe (US title: The Celts: Conquerors of Ancient Europe; French: L'Europe des Celtes) is a 1992 illustrated monograph on the history of the Celts. Written by French Celticist Christiane Éluère, and published by Éditions Gallimard as the 158th volume in the "Découvertes" collection, in collaboration with the Réunion des Musées Nationaux. According to the German archaeologist Ferdinand Maier, this "little book is aimed at the general public who have an increasingly 'visual interest' in ancient cultures and the alike".

== Contents and synopsis ==
Christiane Éluère traces more than half a millennium of the Celtic history with an archaeological approach, from roughly 9th century BC to the 1st century AD, and the survival of their culture to the island peoples, eventually reborn in the art of Celtic Christianity.

The book opens with a series of bronze masks and hoary faces carved in stone from 7th century BC to 1st century AD (pp. 1–9), which were discovered in France, Austria and Bohemia. The body text is divided into six chapters: 1, "Birth of a Warrior Aristocracy" (Naissance d'une aristocratie guerrière, pp. 13–27); 2, "The First Celtic Princes" (La splendeur des premiers princes celtes, pp. 29–49); 3, "The All-Conquering Celts" (Les Celtes à la conquête du monde, pp. 51–77); 4, "The Celts Against the Might of Rome" (Les Celtes face au géant romain, pp. 79–101); 5, "Realms of Religion" (L'Univers des dieux, pp. 103–119); 6, "Celtic Memories" (Mémoires celtiques, pp. 121–127).

The following "Documents" section is made up of an anthology divided into nine parts, which delves into more specialised texts and relevant authors on multiple aspects of the Celts, including an introduction of homosexuality among the ancient Celts.

1. Celtic territory on the map of the ancient world (Le pays des Celtes, pp. 130–133);
2. Classic portraits of early 'European Man' (Portrait de l'«homo europeanus», pp. 134–137);
3. Society and private life (Société et vie privée, pp. 138–143);
4. Languages and writing in Celtic culture (Langue et écriture, pp. 144–147);
5. Were the Celts bloodthirsty warriors? (Des guerriers sanguinaires, pp. 148–153);
6. The druids (Les druides, pp. 154–159);
7. Celtic gold (L'or des Celtes, pp. 160–161);
8. Celtic art (English edition exclusive, pp. 162–165);
9. The first British heroine (English edition exclusive, pp. 166–167)
- Further reading (p. 168)
- List of illustrations (pp. 168–173)
- Index (pp. 173–175)
- Acknowledgments/Photo credits (p. 175)

== Reception ==
Sarah Anderson wrote in her book Anderson's Travel Companion: "[The book] is concise, well illustrated and packed with nuggets of information."

According to the opinion of a reviewer of the Encyclopédie de l'Arbre Celtique, this is a "great book, very well illustrated. However, it is regrettable that the almost abusive use of examples, at the expense of a generalization, and of a comprehensive idea of the Celts' lifestyle."

In its book review section, the archaeology magazine Minerva gave a positive review to the book: "The book treads a well worn path, leading us from the late Hallstatt Fürstensitze ('princely seats' or 'seats of princes') through the development and spread of the La Tène culture across Europe and the emergence of Roman power. [...] The present version adheres closely to the original and in an excellent translation retains the flowing, elegant quality of the original French."

== See also ==
- Celtic art
- Celtic culture
- Celtic studies
- Celtic mythology
- Celtic Otherworld
- Celtic Revival
- Ancient Celtic religion
- The Celts (BBC documentary)
- The Celts (S4C documentary)
