= Numbers: The Universal Language =

1996 book by Denis Guedj

- First French edition. The cover featuring a 19th-century engraving of anthropomorphic numbers.
- Author: Denis Guedj
- Original title: L'empire des nombres
- Translator: Lory Frankel
- Cover artist: Anonymous
- Language: French
- Series: Découvertes Gallimard●Sciences (FR); Abrams Discoveries (US); New Horizons (UK)
- Release number: 300th in collection
- Genre: Nonfiction monograph
- Publisher: Éditions Gallimard (FR); Harry N. Abrams (US); Thames & Hudson (UK)
- Publication date: 18 November 1996
- Publication place: France
- English publication date: 1997 (US); 1998 (UK)
- Media type: Print (paperback)
- Pages: 176 pp.
- ISBN: 978-2-0705-3373-2 (first edition)
- OCLC: 910594391
- Preceded by: L'Art et la Science : L'esprit des chefs-d'œuvre
- Followed by: La guerre d'Algérie : Histoire d'une déchirure

Numbers: The Universal Language (French: L'empire des nombres, lit. 'The Empire of Numbers') is a 1996 illustrated monograph on numbers and their history. Written by the French historian of science Denis Guedj, and published in pocket format by Éditions Gallimard as the 300th volume in their "Découvertes" collection (known as "Abrams Discoveries" in the United States, and "New Horizons" in the United Kingdom). The book was adapted into a documentary film of the same title in 2001.

== Introduction ==
From left: US and UK editions. The covers featuring the ten digits interpreted by the computer artist Julio Bravo, 1997.

The book is part of the Sciences et techniques series (formerly belonging to Sciences series) in the "Découvertes Gallimard" collection. As a work of popularisation of mathematics, it uses simple language to describe the basics of numbers—arithmetic, integer, natural number, concepts of zero and infinity—as well as how numbers and their symbolism came to be used in art and other disciplines.

According to the tradition of "Découvertes", which is based on an abundant pictorial documentation and a way of bringing together visual documents and texts, enhanced by printing on coated paper, as commented in L'Express, "genuine monographs, published like art books". It's almost like a "graphic novel", replete with colour plates.

== Contents ==
The book opens with a "trailer" (pp. 1–9), that is, a series of full-page photographs showing The Powers of Ten. The body text is divided into seven chapters:

- Chapter 1: "How Many?" (pp. 13–23);
- Chapter 2: "From Numbers to Figures" (pp. 25–43);
- Chapter 3: "Positional Notation" (pp. 45–59);
- Chapter 4: "Natural Numbers" (pp. 61–77);
- Chapter 5: "The Universe Expands" (pp. 79–103);
- Chapter 6: "From Zero to Infinity" (pp. 105–121);
- Chapter 7: "The Impossible Definition" (pp. 123–127).

The second part of the book, the "Documents", containing a compilation of excerpts divided into nine parts:

1. Counting (pp. 130–131);
2. Against Pythagoras, Against Zeno (pp. 132–135);
3. Numbers and religion (pp. 136–137);
4. Numbers, philosophy, and poetry (pp. 138–141);
5. The science of measurement (pp. 142–145);
6. The abacus and calculator (pp. 146–147);
7. Music and mathematics (pp. 148–151);
8. Number and psychology (pp. 152–155);
9. The wit and wisdom of numbers (pp. 156–163).
- Amusing Puzzle (p. 164);
- Glossary (pp. 165–167);
- Chronology (pp. 168–170);
- Further Reading (p. 170);
- List of Illustrations (pp. 171–173);
- Index (pp. 173–174).

== Reception ==
On Babelio, the book gets an average of 3.0/5 based on 11 ratings. Goodreads reported, based on 66 ratings, an average of 3.61 out of 5, indicating "generally positive opinions".

== Adaptation ==
In 2001, the book was adapted as a documentary film of the same name. A co-production between La Sept-Arte and Trans Europe Film, with the collaboration of Éditions Gallimard and CNRS Images Média, the film was directed by Philippe Truffault, with voice-over narration by Denis Guedj himself. It was broadcast on Arte as part of the television programme The Human Adventure, and released on DVD by Arte vidéo, with English dubbed audio. The film has also been dubbed into German by the title Im Reich der Zahlen.

== See also ==
- Number theory
- Mathematics and art
- The Parrot's Theorem
