= Carmen Bernand =

French historian and anthropologist

- Born: Carmen Muñoz; 19 September 1939 (age 87); France
- Education: University of Buenos Aires
- Occupations: Historian, anthropologist, Latin Americanist
- Employer: Paris Nanterre University
- Notable work: The Incas: People of the Sun
- Spouse: André Bernand

Carmen Bernand (born Carmen Muñoz on 19 September 1939) is a French anthropologist, historian and Latin Americanist.

== Biography ==
Carmen Bernand was born in France to Spanish refugee parents, she lived in Argentina for 25 years, where she studied ethnology at the University of Buenos Aires. At the end of 1964, she moved to Paris and prepared a postgraduate thesis under the direction of Claude Lévi-Strauss. In 1966, she married the epigraphist André Bernand (1923–2013).

Bernand is a specialist in the history of New World and Latin America, she conducted field surveys of Andean populations in Argentina, Peru and Ecuador. Since the late 1980s, she has devoted herself to the historical anthropology of Latin America.

She teaches at the Paris Nanterre University and is a member of the Institut Universitaire de France. She is also a deputy director of the Centre de recherches sur les mondes américains ('Centre for Research on the American Worlds') since 1999 and member of editorial board of the anthropological and museological journal Gradhiva.

With Serge Gruzinski, she published De l’idolâtrie : Une archéologie des sciences religieuses and two volumes of Histoire du Nouveau Monde. She is the author of Un Inca platonicien : Garcilaso de la Vega 1539–1616 and a heavily illustrated pocket book for “Découvertes Gallimard”, Les Incas : Peuple du Soleil, which has been translated into ten languages, including English. She also wrote in Spanish a crime novel set in Inca Empire.

== Selected publications ==
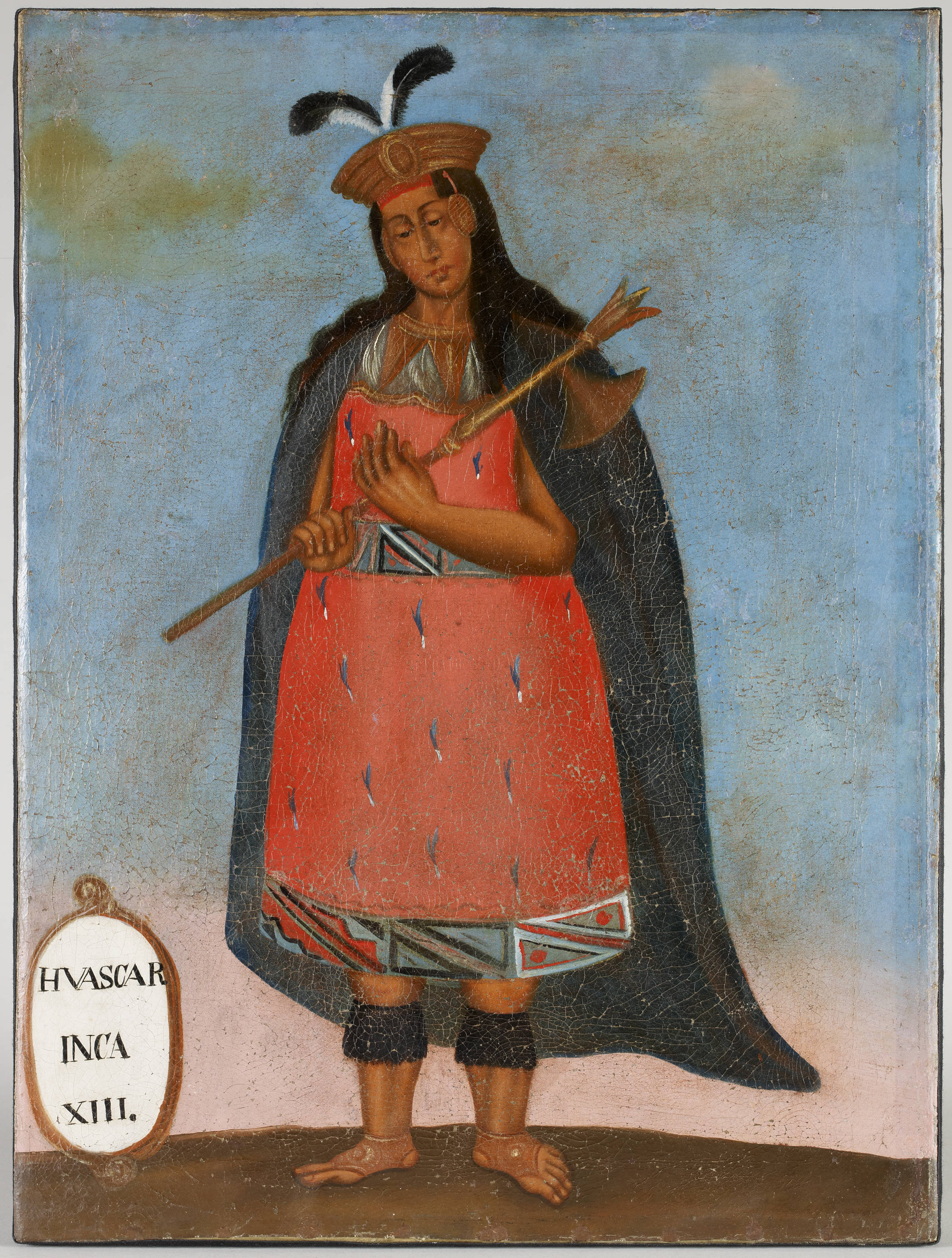
Portrait of Huáscar, featured on the cover of Les Incas : Peuple du Soleil.

- Co-author with Serge Gruzinski, De l’idolâtrie : Une archéologie des sciences religieuses, collection « Philosophie Générale ». Seuil, 1988
- Les Incas : Peuple du Soleil, collection « Découvertes Gallimard » (nº 37), série Histoire. Éditions Gallimard, 1988 (new edition in 2010)
  - US edition – The Incas: People of the Sun, “Abrams Discoveries” series. Harry N. Abrams, 1994
  - UK edition – The Incas: Empire of Blood and Gold, ‘New Horizons’ series. Thames & Hudson, 1994
- Co-author with Serge Gruzinski, Histoire du Nouveau Monde (2 volumes), Fayard, 1991 and 1993
- Historia de Buenos Aires, Fondo de Cultura Económica USA, 1999
- Un Inca platonicien : Garcilaso de la Vega 1539–1616, Fayard, 2006
- Co-author with Catherine Escrive, Viracocha, le père du Soleil inca, Éditions Larousse, 2008
- Cuzco, le nombril du monde, Éditions de La Flandonnière, 2010
