= Denis Guedj =

French historian of science

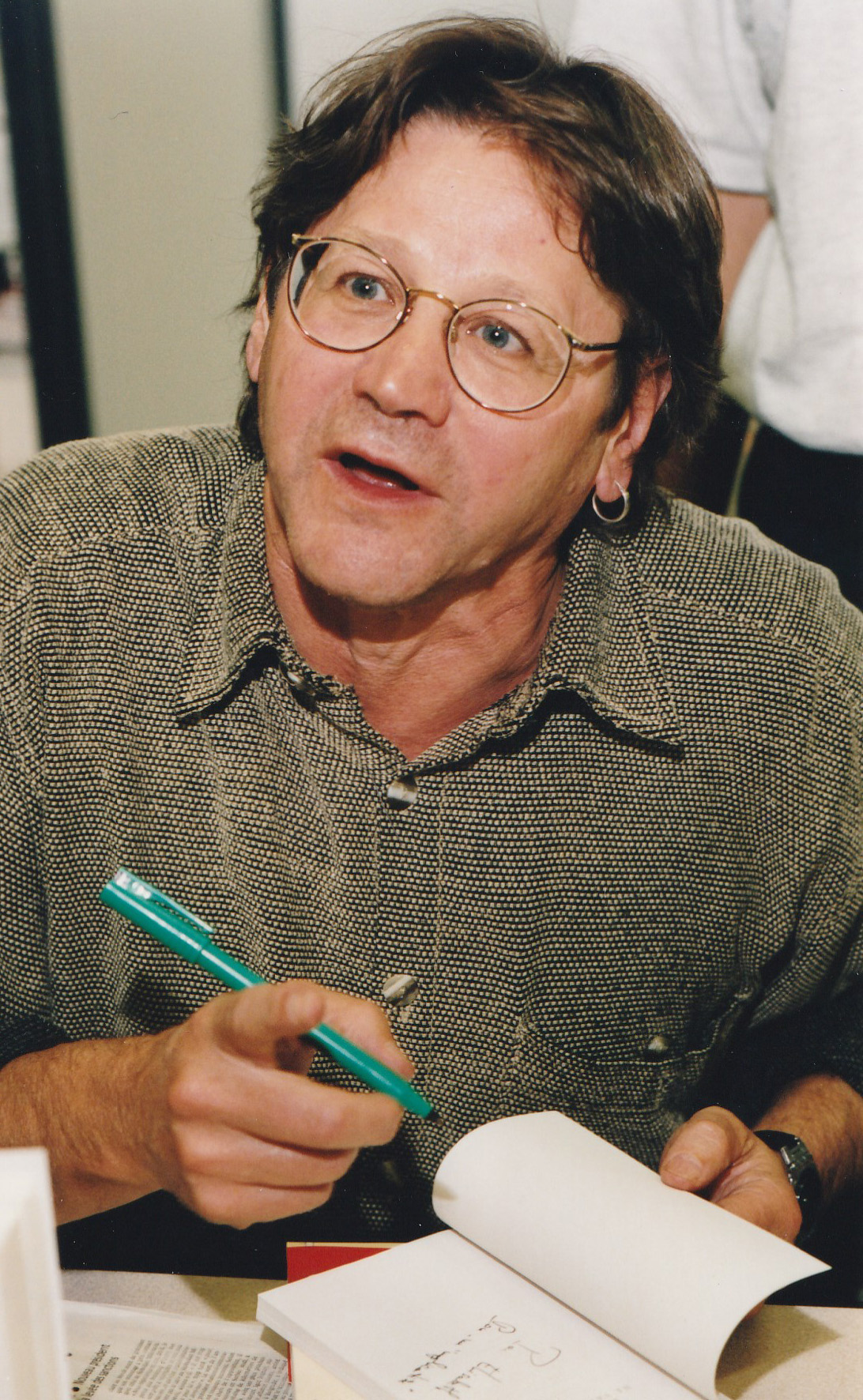
- Denis Guedj at the 2000 International Geography Festival
- Born: 1940; Sétif, Algeria
- Died: 24 April 2010 (aged 69–70); Paris, France
- Occupations: Novelist, professor
- Employer: Paris VIII University
- Known for: Numbers: The Universal Language, The Parrot's Theorem

Denis Guedj (1940 – 24 April 2010) was a French novelist and a professor of the History of Science at Paris VIII University. He was born in Setif. He spent many years devising courses and games for teaching mathematics to adults and children. He is the author of Numbers: The Universal Language and of the novel The Parrot's Theorem. He died in Paris.

== Bibliography ==
- La Méridienne, Éditions Seghers, 1987.
- La Révolution des savants, coll. « Découvertes Gallimard » (nº 48), série Sciences. Éditions Gallimard, 1988.
- L'empire des nombres, coll. « Découvertes Gallimard » (nº 300), série Sciences. Gallimard, 1996.
  - US edition – Numbers: The Universal Language, "Abrams Discoveries" series. Harry N. Abrams, 1997
  - UK edition – Numbers: The Universal Language, ‘New Horizons’ series. Thames & Hudson, 1998
- La Gratuité ne vaut plus rien et autres chroniques mathématiques, Éditions du Seuil, 1997.
- Le Théorème du Perroquet, Le Seuil, 1998.
  - The Parrot's Theorem, Weidenfeld & Nicolson, 2000
- Génis ou le Bambou parapluie, Le Seuil, 1999.
- Le Mètre du monde, Le Seuil, 2000.
- La Bela - Autobiographie d'une caravelle, Le Seuil, 2001.
- One zéro show et Du point à la ligne, Le Seuil, 2001.
- Les Cheveux de Bérénice, Le Seuil, 2003.
- Zéro, ou les cinq vies d'Aémer, Robert Laffont, 2005.
- Villa des hommes, Robert Laffont, 2007.
- Les mathématiques expliquées à mes filles, Le Seuil, 2008.
