= Anne Berthelot =

French Medievalist and Romance philologist

- Born: 1 November 1957 (age 69)
- Education: École normale supérieure
- Occupations: Medievalist, Romance philologist

Anne Berthelot (French: [an bɛʁtəlo]; born 1 November 1957) is a French professor of Medieval French literature and studies. She is currently teaching at the University of Connecticut since 1990.

== Career ==
Anne Berthelot is an agrégée des lettres classiques since 1980, and a graduate of the École normale supérieure. She obtained the Doctorat de troisième cycle from Paris-Sorbonne University in 1982, with her dissertation entitled L'Enchanteur et le Livre, ou le savoir de Merlin. Then she pursued a Doctor of Letters at Paris-Sorbonne University in 1987, with the research work Figures et fonction de l'écrivain au XIII^{e} siècle under the direction of the Romanist and Medievalist Daniel Poirion.

She is a specialist in the prose romances of the 13th century, she is particularly interested in the problems of enunciation and specialises in Arthurian Literature with a comparative approach, she has written numerous books and articles on these subjects. She helped to edit the Lancelot-Graal and prepared a study of Merlin in the literature of England, France and Germany from the 12th to the 15th centuries.

== Arthur et la Table ronde : La force d'une légende ==
Arthur et la Table ronde : La force d'une légende
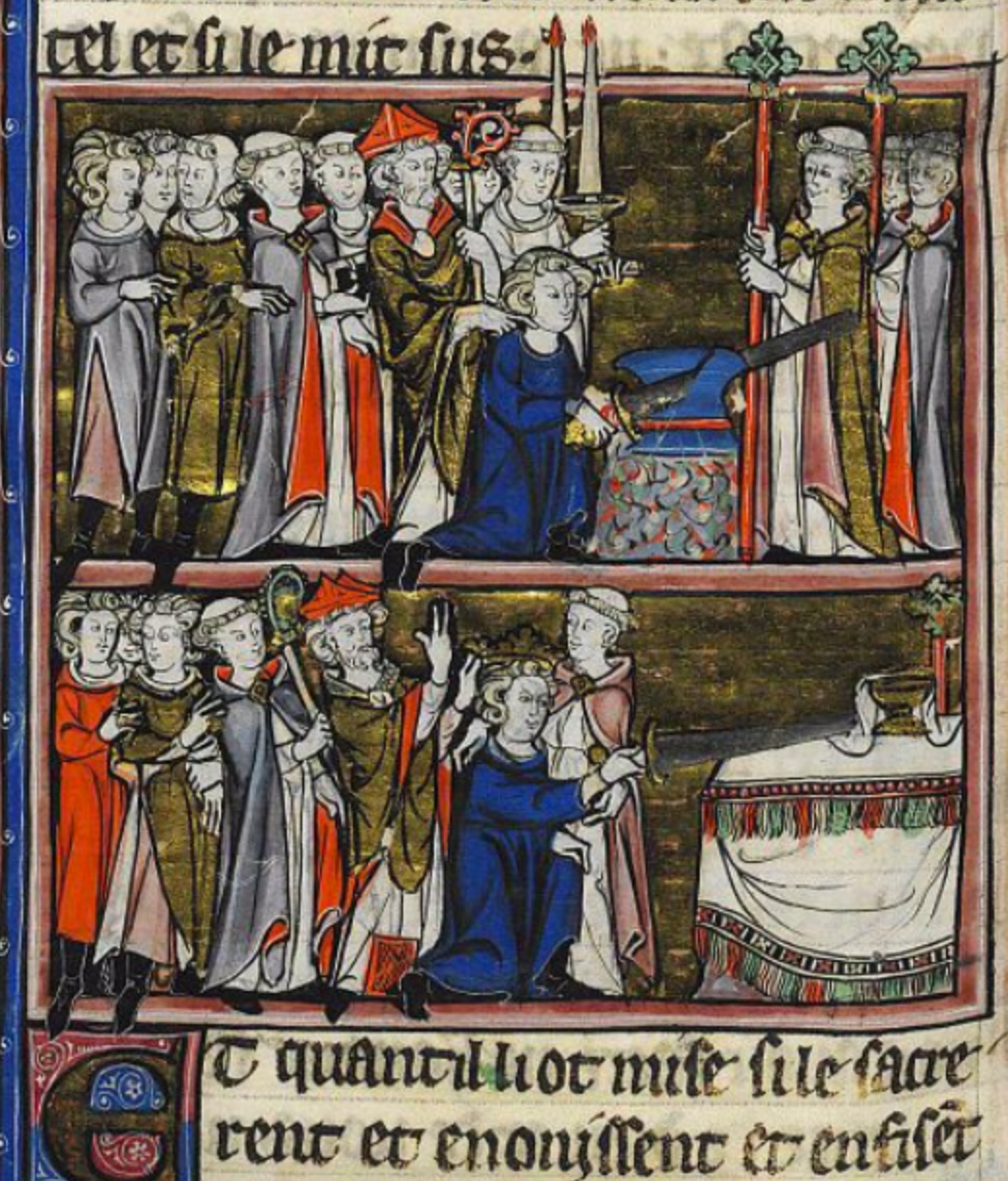
- "Young Arthur pulling the Excalibur", cover image for French edition
- Author: Anne Berthelot
- Original title: Arthur et la Table ronde : La force d'une légende
- Translator: Ruth Sharman
- Cover artist: Anonymous (FR ed.); Évrard d'Espinques (UK ed.); William Dyce (US ed.)
- Language: French
- Series: Découvertes Gallimard●Littérature
- Release number: 298
- Subject: King Arthur, Arthurian Literature
- Genre: Nonfiction monograph
- Publisher: FR: Éditions Gallimard; US: Harry N. Abrams; UK: Thames & Hudson
- Publication date: 1996
- Publication place: France
- English publication date: 1997
- Media type: Print (Paperback)
- Pages: 160 pp.
- ISBN: 978-2-070-53376-3 (first edition)
- OCLC: 994764452
- Preceded by: La Danse 1/ Du ballet de cour au ballet blanc
- Followed by: L'Art et la Science : L'esprit des chefs-d'œuvre
- Website: www.gallimard.fr/Catalogue/GALLIMARD/Decouvertes-Gallimard/Decouvertes-Gallimard/Litteratures/Arthur-et-la-Table-ronde

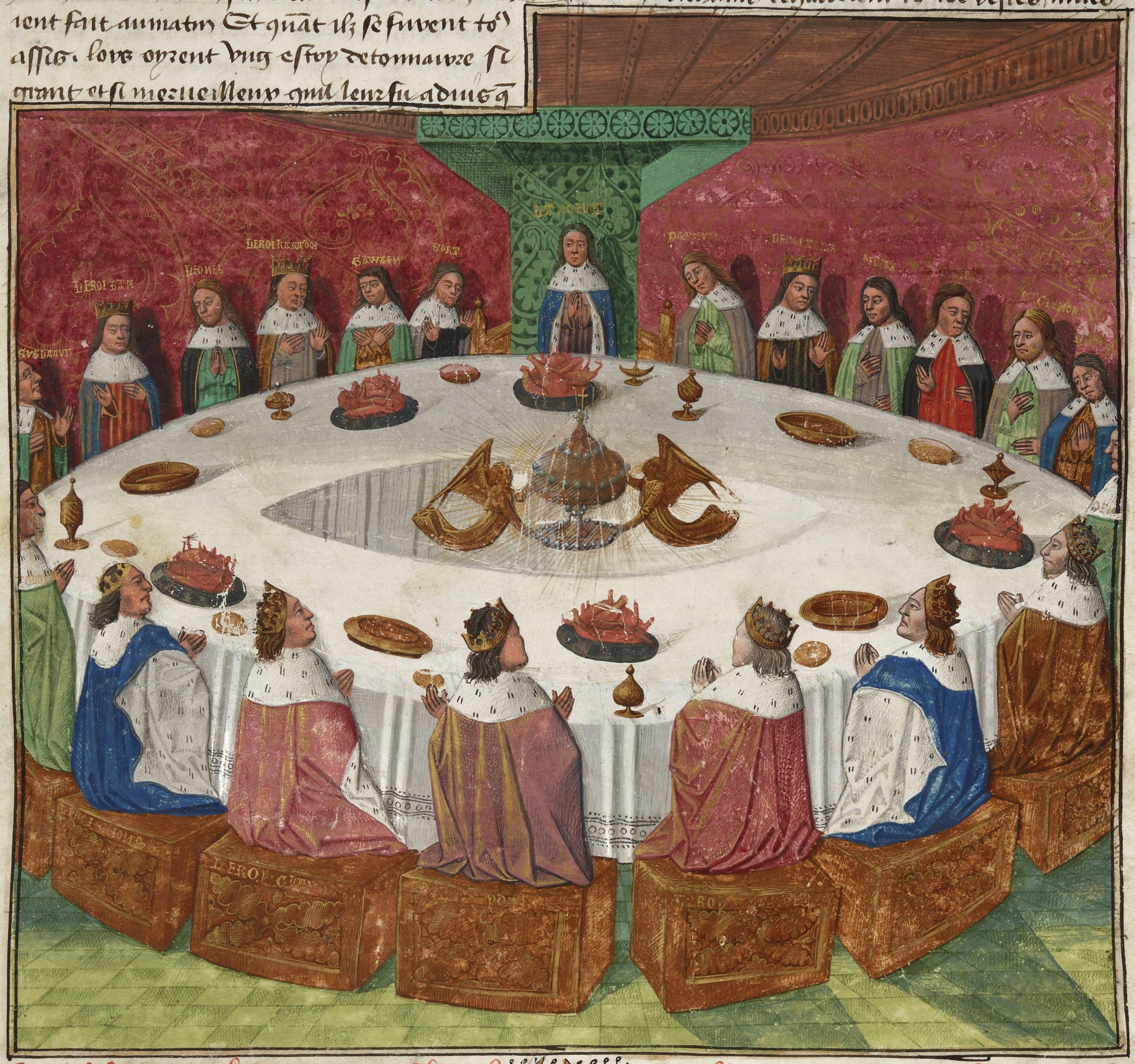
"King Arthur's knights and the vision of the Holy Grail", cover image for UK edition. The newly reprinted UK edition has a different cover.

"Knights of the Round Table Departing on the Quest for the Holy Grail", cover image for US edition.

The historical origins of the Arthurian legend are lost in the mists of time: Roman Britain, Sarmatians, Picts or the Saxon kings? Who were Arthur's contemporaries? Archaeological findings in Wales, Cornwall and Scotland suggest the possible existence of this legendary figure. Arthurian legend is central to Anglo-Saxon culture, and by the 12th century King Arthur and his kingdom had become a national myth, elaborated by English and French writers. It owes its existence in literature to an Anglo-French rivalry: Henry II of England, for establishing his legitimacy, had the story of an Anglo-Saxon hero written that was destined to be a counterpart to Charlemagne. Thus was born the legend of Arthur. During the Middle Ages, Arthur became the absolute model of a knight, herald of courtly values and defender of Christendom.

Between myth and history, Anne Berthelot manages to unravel the threads of this legend in a volume—Arthur et la Table ronde : La force d'une légende (lit. 'Arthur and the Round Table: The Power of a Legend'; UK edition – King Arthur: Chivalry and Legend; US edition – King Arthur and the Knights of the Round Table)—published by Éditions Gallimard as the 298th volume in their Littérature series for the "Découvertes" collection.

The book contains a huge number of colour illustrations taken from medieval illuminated manuscripts, 16th and 19th-century engravings, Pre-Raphaelite paintings and other sources. It opens with a series of reproductions of Julia Margaret Cameron's photographic illustrations for Idylls of the King—a cycle of twelve narrative poems by Alfred Tennyson—which retells the legend of King Arthur. The body text is divided into five chapters: I, "The Historical Context" (Arthur et l'histoire); II, "The Creation of a Legend" (La Création d'une légende); III, "The Life of Arthur" (La Vie d'Arthur); IV, "Feudalism and Chivalry" (La féodalité et la chevalerie); V, "An Extraordinary Literary Flowering" (Une fantastique floraison littéraire). The following "Documents" section in British edition—which is reformulated by Thames & Hudson—contains a compilation of excerpts which is divided into six chapters: 1, Arthur in 12th-century literature; 2, Arthur in the Middle Ages; 3, The Round Table and the Holy Grail; 4, Arthur in the 19th and 20th centuries; 5, In the footsteps of King Arthur; 6, King Arthur in the cinema. The original French version has seven chapters in this section and the contents are slightly different. (Note: The "Documents" section (Témoignages et Documents) of French edition contains: 1, Différents visages d'Arthur dans la littérature du XII^{e} siècle; 2, Arthur dans les textes français du Moyen Âge; 3, La Table ronde et la quête du Graal; 4, La fortune anglo-saxonne d'Arthur; 5, Arthur dans la littérature du XX^{e} siècle; 6, Sur les traces d'Arthur; 7, Arthur au cinéma.) At the end of the book are further reading, list of illustrations and index. It has been translated into American and British English, Japanese, Polish, and South Korean.

== Selected bibliography ==
- Le Chevalier à la charette, Le Chevalier au lion : résumé analytique, commentaire critique, documents complémentaires, Nathan, 1991 (critical analysis on Chrétien de Troyes' works)
- Arthur et la Table ronde : La force d'une légende, collection « Découvertes Gallimard » (nº 298), série Littératures. Éditions Gallimard, 1996
  - UK edition – King Arthur: Chivalry and Legend, 'New Horizons' series. Thames & Hudson, 1997 (reprinted 2004, 2011)
  - US edition – King Arthur and the Knights of the Round Table, "Abrams Discoveries" series. Harry N. Abrams, 1997 (reprinted 2009)
- Le roman courtois : Une introduction, Armand Colin, 2005

Collective works and translations

- Translated from Old French by Anne Berthelot and many others, Chrétien de Troyes : Œuvres complètes, collection « Bibliothèque de la Pléiade » (nº 408), Éditions Gallimard, 1994
- Anonymous, edited by AA.VV., Le Livre du Graal, tome I, collection « Bibliothèque de la Pléiade » (nº 476), Éditions Gallimard, 2001
- Anonymous, edited by AA.VV., Le Livre du Graal, tome II, collection « Bibliothèque de la Pléiade » (nº 498), Éditions Gallimard, 2003
- Robert de Boron, translated from Old French by Anne Berthelot, Merlin, collection « La Bibliothèque Gallimard » (nº 164), Éditions Gallimard, 2005
