= Henri Loyrette =

French businessman (born 1952)

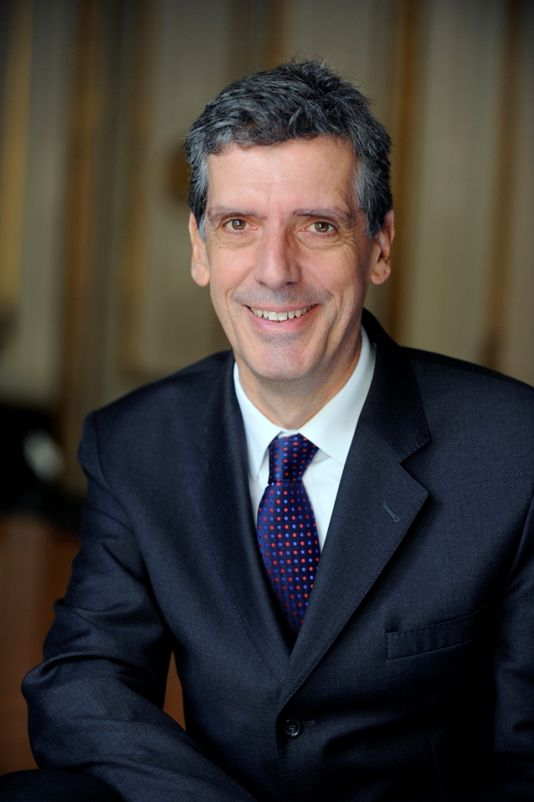
- Born: 31 May 1952 (age 74); Neuilly-sur-Seine, Paris, France
- Occupations: Author, Academic, Museum curator
- Writing career
- Genres: Art history, Art, Criticism
- Notable work: Nineteenth Century French Art

Henri Loyrette (French pronunciation: [ɑ̃ʁi lwaʁɛt]; born 31 May 1952 in Neuilly-sur-Seine, a suburb of Paris) was the chairman of Admical, a French organisation dedicated to corporate philanthropy, and the former director of the Louvre Museum (2001–2013). He became first curator and then director of the Musée d'Orsay in 1978 and 1994, respectively.

== Career ==
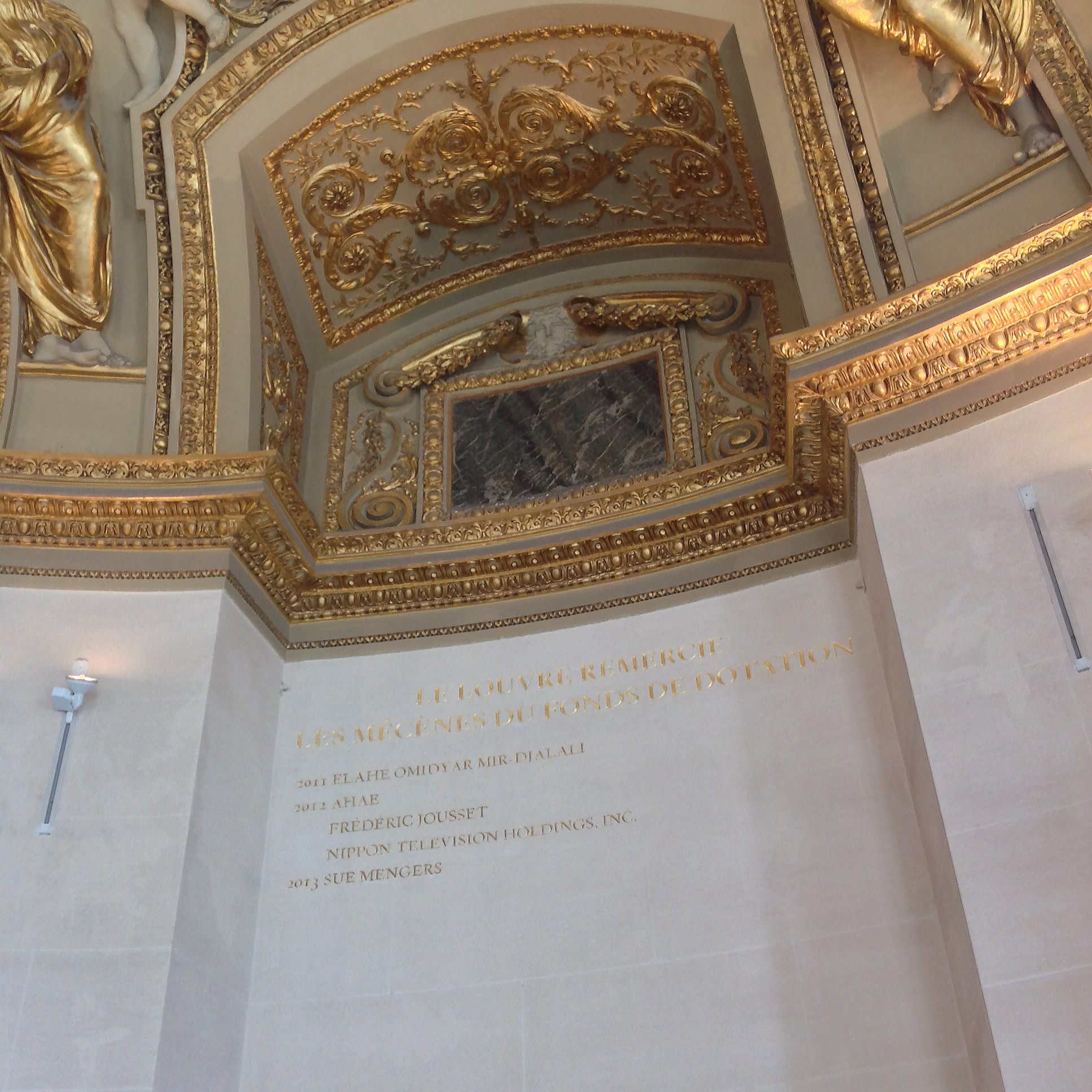
"Ahae" etched in stone at the Louvre in Paris, as one of its patrons.

Loyrette was named curator of the Musée d'Orsay in 1978. His focus on 19th century architecture and painting resulted in several important exhibitions, including the 1987–88 exhibition “Chicago, Birth of a Metropolis,” developed by the then-director of the Art Institute of Chicago, John Zukowsky.

In 1997, he was elected to the Académie des Beaux-Arts, which awards prizes for artistic merit in nine areas. Loyrette was listed under Section VI - Unattached Members, in the organization's Perspective on the Academie, Number 91, from 2020.

Loyrette's appointment to the directorship of the Louvre Museum was announced on 28 March 2001. According to Resnicow Shroeder Associates, previously Loyrette had "served as Director of the Musée d'Orsay from 1994 to 2001, and curator at the Musée d'Orsay from 1978 to 1999".

Loyrette's contract was extended for another three years (through 2013), during which he was to oversee construction of an expansion in Paris, as well as a new branch in Abu Dhabi.

=== Exhibitions ===
Loyrette has organized several exhibitions on diverse subjects, including exhibitions on Edgar Degas, Honoré Daumier, and the origins of Impressionism.

In 2012, Loyrette endorsed an exhibition with photographs by Ahae, the South Korean businessman Yoo Byung-eun, praising his artistic qualities. Following the sinking of the ferry Sewol, Hervé Barbaret, Loyrette's deputy, disclosed to L'Express in 2014 that "The Louvre did not pay a penny to organize this event. The artist paid the production entirely and paid a little more than €500,000 (~US$700.000) to exhibit himself in the Tuileries". Yoo further donated €1.1 million (~US$1.5 million) to The Louvre. Loyrette's decision to rent out the Tuileries Garden, administratively attached to The Louvre, prompted French media as well as Korean expatriates in France to raise their concerns over French cultural institutions accepting self-financed exhibitions in return for donations.

== Literary works ==
Loyrette is also an author, with a total of nineteen books on various subjects, including Degas, Gustave Eiffel, and Marcel Proust. One of his most popular works is his book Nineteenth Century French Art (pictured).

=== Books ===
- Nineteenth Century French Art
- Gustave Eiffel, Fribourg, Office du Livre, 1985
- Degas : « Je voudrais être illustre et inconnu », coll. « Découvertes Gallimard » (nº 36), série Arts. Paris, Gallimard, 1988
  - Trad. into English – Degas: The Man and His Art, "Abrams Discoveries" series, New York, Harry N. Abrams, 1993
  - Degas: Passion and Intellect, 'New Horizons' series, London, Thames & Hudson, 1993
- Degas inédit, (direction de l'ouvrage), La Documentation française, 1989
- Degas, Paris, Fayard, 1991
- La Famille Halévy. Entre le théâtre et l'histoire, (direction de l'ouvrage), R.M.N.-Fayard, 1996

=== Exhibitions catalogues ===
- Degas e l'Italia, 1984
- Degas, 1988
- Impressionnisme. Les Origines, 1994
- Cézanne, 1995
- Daumier, 1999
- Through My Window. Editions Assouline. 2012. ISBN 978-1-61428-071-2.

== Louvre Abu Dhabi ==
Loyrette endorsed the building of a new Louvre museum in Abu Dhabi, the capital of the United Arab Emirates. This has sparked much controversy both in France and with the international community.

== Sources ==
- Henri Loyrette at Encyclopædia Britannica
