= Rouen Courthouse =

Building in Rouen, France

Palais de justice de Rouen
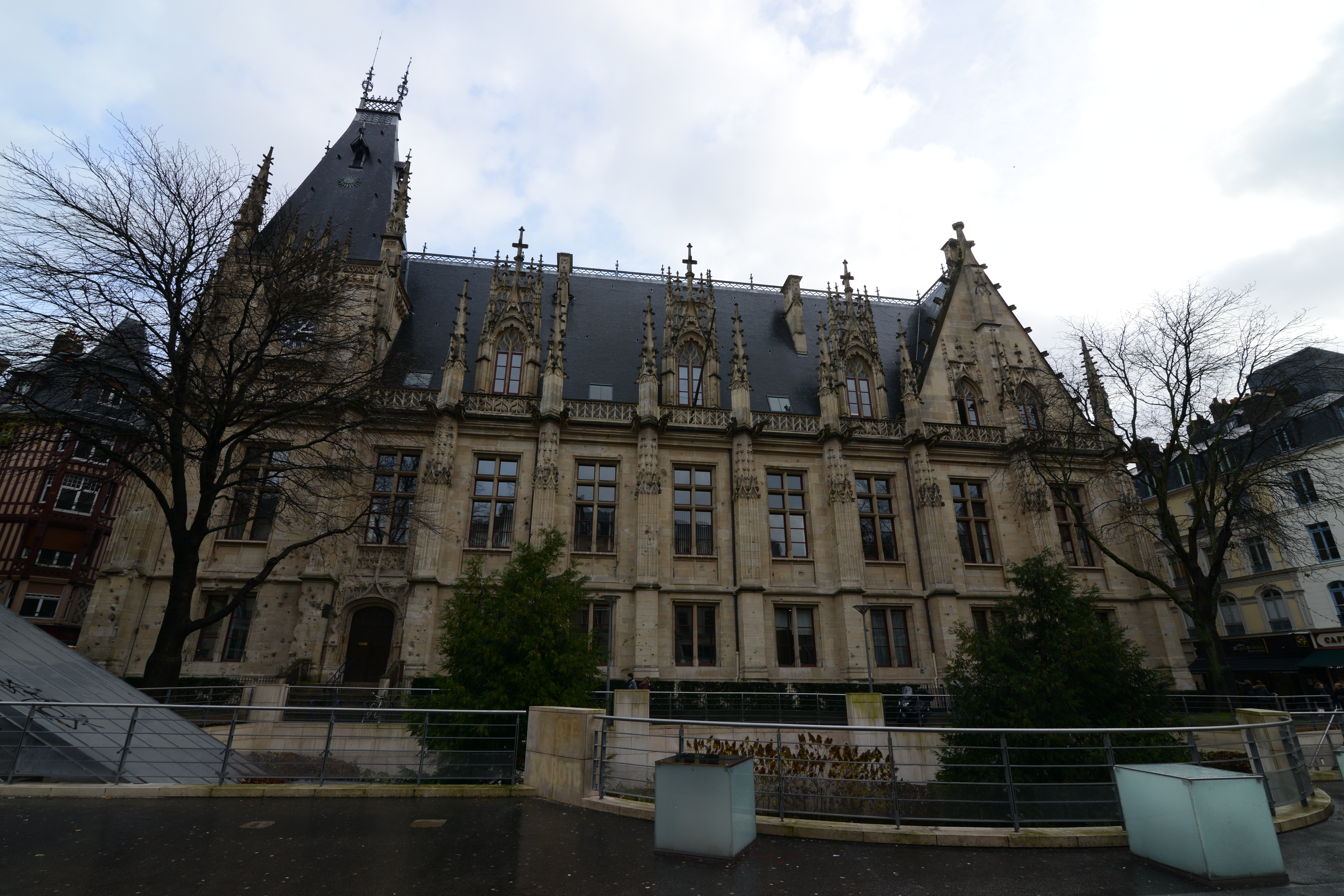
- Courthouse facade on Place du Maréchal-Foch
- Interactive map of Palais de justice de Rouen
- Location: Rouen, Seine-Maritime, France
- Coordinates: 49°26′33″N 1°05′32″E
- Type: Courthouse
- Beginning date: 1499; 527 years ago
- Completion date: 1507; 519 years ago
- Restored date: after damaged during Bombardment of Rouen on August 26, 1944; 81 years ago
- Heritage: Monument historique (1840, 1977, 1979)

The Rouen Courthouse, formerly known as the Échiquier de Normandie (Exchequer of Normandy), is a building located in Rouen, in the French department of Seine-Maritime, in the Normandy region. It stands as a prominent landmark in the Norman city.

Constructed primarily between 1499 and 1507 to accommodate the Parloir aux Bourgeois and the former Exchequer of Normandy, it was designated as the Parliament of Normandy during the reign of François I in 1515. Subsequently, it functioned as a courthouse from the French Revolution onwards. In the 19th century, the building underwent expansion towards the Jeanne-d'Arc and Socrate streets.

Due to its grandeur and intricate design, the monument reflects the revived prosperity of Rouen in the late 15th century, renewing a neglected municipal heritage.

As an example of civil architecture in the Louis XII style from the early decades of the 16th century, the monument has been classified as a historical monument since 1840. Its architectural style is reminiscent of the contemporary Hôtel de Bourgtheroulde and the French Finance Office.

The courthouse in Rouen suffered significant damage during a bombing on August 26, 1944, before the city's liberation, resulting in the near destruction of the central Louis XII-style main building. Extensive restoration work was carried out to rebuild the damaged sections, leading to the building's classification as a historical monument in 1977 and its definitive inscription in 1979.

The site is located near the underground tram station Courthouse – Gisèle Halimi.

== History ==
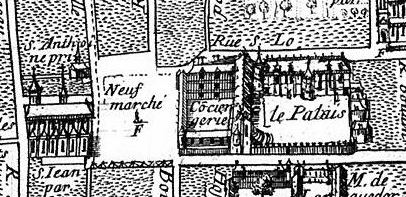
Jacques Gomboust's 1655 plan dislays the Saint-Jean-sur-Renelle church, the Place du Marché-Neuf and the Courthouse (École nationale supérieure d'architecture de Normandie).

On March 3, 1494, the councilors of Rouen decided to construct a large hall at Neuf Marché, now known as the Salle des Procureurs (Prosecutors' room), to serve as a gathering place for merchants. This marked the beginning of the construction of the current courthouse, with the western building completed between 1499 and 1508 by architects Roger Ango and Roulland Le Roux.

In the 15th century, Norman justice was administered by an itinerant court. In 1499, King Louis XII, influenced by Cardinal Georges d'Amboise, reformed the Échiquier and established it as a permanent court.

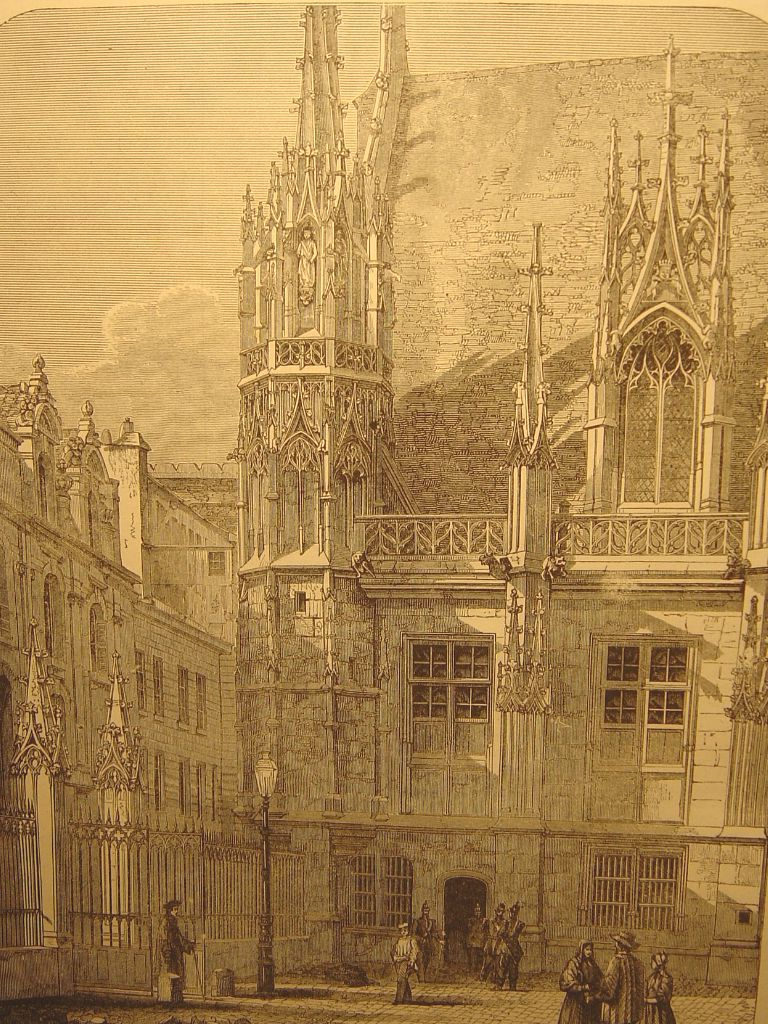
The West wing before the late 19th century renovation (L'illustration Européenne, 1872).

When Louis XII established his residence in Rouen in 1508, the Royal Palace and the Exchequer of Normandy, which later became the Parliament of Normandy during the reign of François I, were built perpendicular to the north end of the first building. The current northern building's façade faces south and spans over 65 m in width. Construction likely began in 1509, with the main structure completed by 1517. This section of the building, showing a stylistic evolution, reflects the Louis XII style, bridging between Gothic art and the early Renaissance.

Between approximately 1525 and 1528, the building was extended by one bay to the east. The roof was then modified with the addition of two large dormers and openings on the upper floor. This extension was partially the work of Roulland Le Roux, the architect of the French Finance Office (Rouen's current tourist office). In 1531, a new staircase on the south bay of the Salle des Procureurs was built by Jean Delarue and Étienne Guiffart, and the eastern half of the northern building was completed around 1550.

In the 18th century, the building was considered too narrow, leading to the construction of a new wing starting in 1700 opposite the Salle des Procureurs. Designed by Jacques II Millets-Désruisseaux, it extended perpendicular to Rue Saint-Lo. To complement this new ensemble, a residential building on Place du Neuf Marché was initiated in 1739 by Pierre Jarry and finished in 1759 by Alexandre Dubois.

The west facade of the building, designed in classical style, featured a central projection that was eight bays long. It was flanked on each end by a corner pavilion set back on two bays.

In the 19th century, the deteriorating condition of these buildings led to a significant event on April 1, 1812, at ten o'clock in the evening when the main pediment collapsed. This collapse caused the ceiling which displayed Jean Jouvenet's painting The Triumph of Justice, created with his left handdue to paralysis in his right hand, to fall.

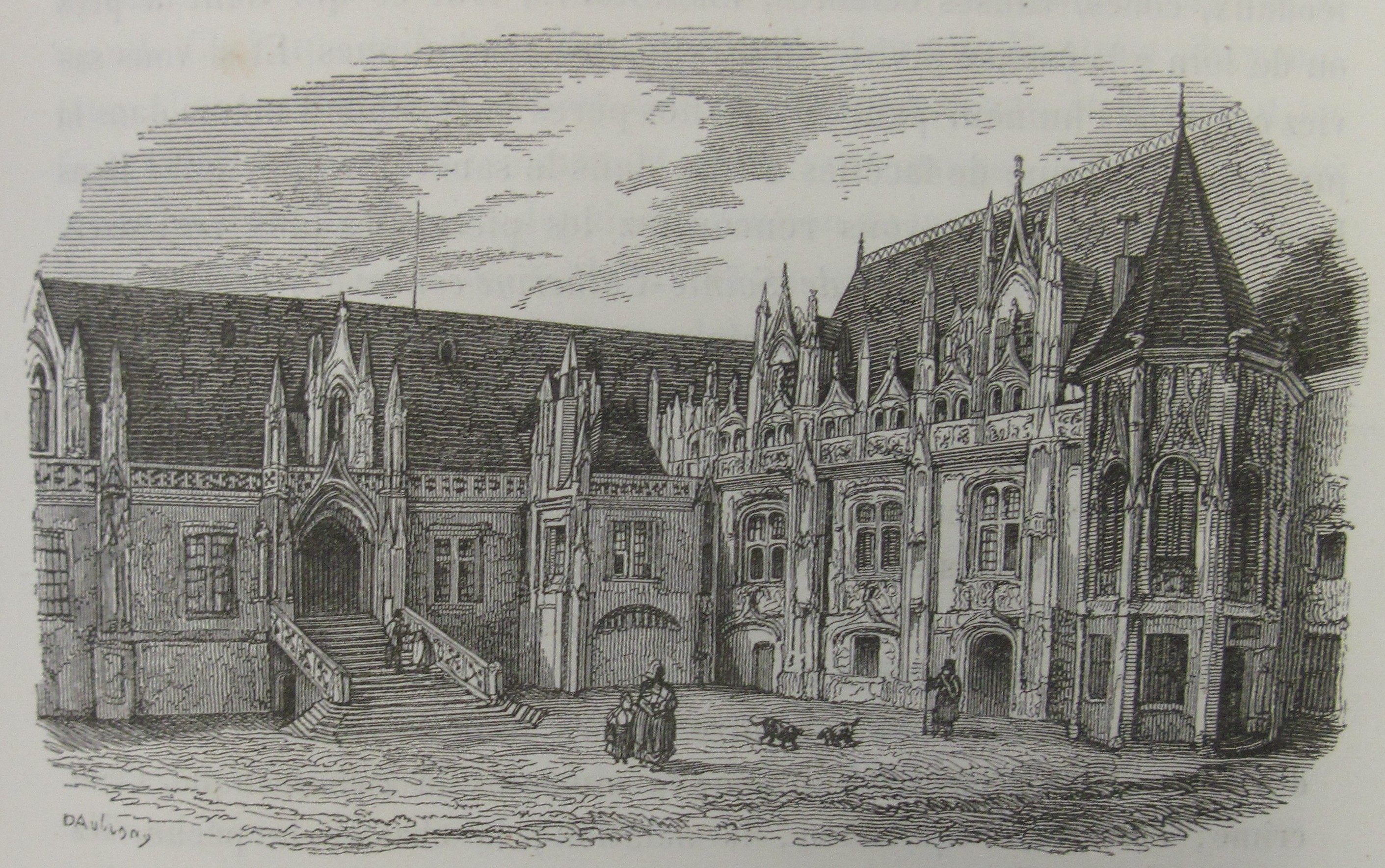
The west wing, with its first neo-Gothic staircase designed by Henri Charles Grégoire, was dismantled at the beginning of the 20th century when the "affaire de l'escalier" (La Normandie historique, pittoresque et monumentale, circa 1843) occurred.

The modern-style buildings that stood in contrast to the rest of the monument were eventually replaced from 1833 to 1836 with more spacious constructions that better matched the style of the two other medieval wings. Additionally, in 1834, the pavilion in the northwest corner of the courtyard and the Gate of the Stags (on Rue aux Juifs) were demolished.

The crenellated wall on Rue aux Juifs, which was accused of darkening the court of honor too much, was replaced by a gate in 1836. In 1844, a general restoration of the façade was entrusted, despite some reservations, to Henri Charles Grégoire (1791–1854), an architect of civil buildings in the Seine-Inférieure department. Unexpectedly, the skill he demonstrated in carrying out this project led him to be recalled by the commission of historical monuments to complete the façade of the Abbey of Saint-Ouen. Concurrently, the staircase of the Salle des Procureurs, which was at risk of collapsing, was replaced with a new neo-Gothic staircase, which Grégoire relocated to the middle of the medieval wing to preserve the intricate facade design of the House.

To replace the statuary of the Courthouse, which was largely lost during the Revolution, Joseph Brun (1792–1855), the winner of the first Prix de Rome in 1817, was commissioned in 1836 to depict various social classes and personalities in their contemporary attire who played a role in the construction of the building. The sculptures includes representations of Louis XII, Anne of Brittany, Cardinal d'Amboise, François I, an allegorical figure of Justice, a ploughman, a village woman, a damsel, a lord, a monk, and an artist.

In line with the prevailing historicism, Louis Desmarest endeavored to restore the decorations of the Grande chambre and the Salle des procureurs, between 1857 and 1885. Currently, Lucien Lefort, a proponent of historicism in Rouen, undertool the reconstruction and expansion of the west wing from 1880 onwards. This wing was originally designed in the 18th century by architect Pierre Jarry.

The staircase adjacent to the medieval wing on the left side of the courtyard was rebuiltconstructed in 1904 by Paul Selmersheim. This creation in the Champenois neo-Gothic style followed the "staircase affair," which involved the dismantling of the staircase completed in 1903 by architect Lucien Lefort.

During the Second World War, the entire building was devastated on April 19, 1944, during the bombing known as the "Red Week," causing almost total destruction of the interiors of the west wing in the flamboyant Gothic style. However, due to a marking error, it was the bombing on August 26, preceding the liberation of the city, that caused the most damage by almost completely destroying the central Louis XII style residential building. Only the stone walls remained standing, while pinnacles, frameworks, and magnificent oak wood ships in the shape of an inverted hull were destroyed. All interiors, including the magnificent Assize Hall, were ravaged. The latter has since been restored with its Renaissance-style coffered ceiling, while the frameworks have been replaced by concrete hulls.

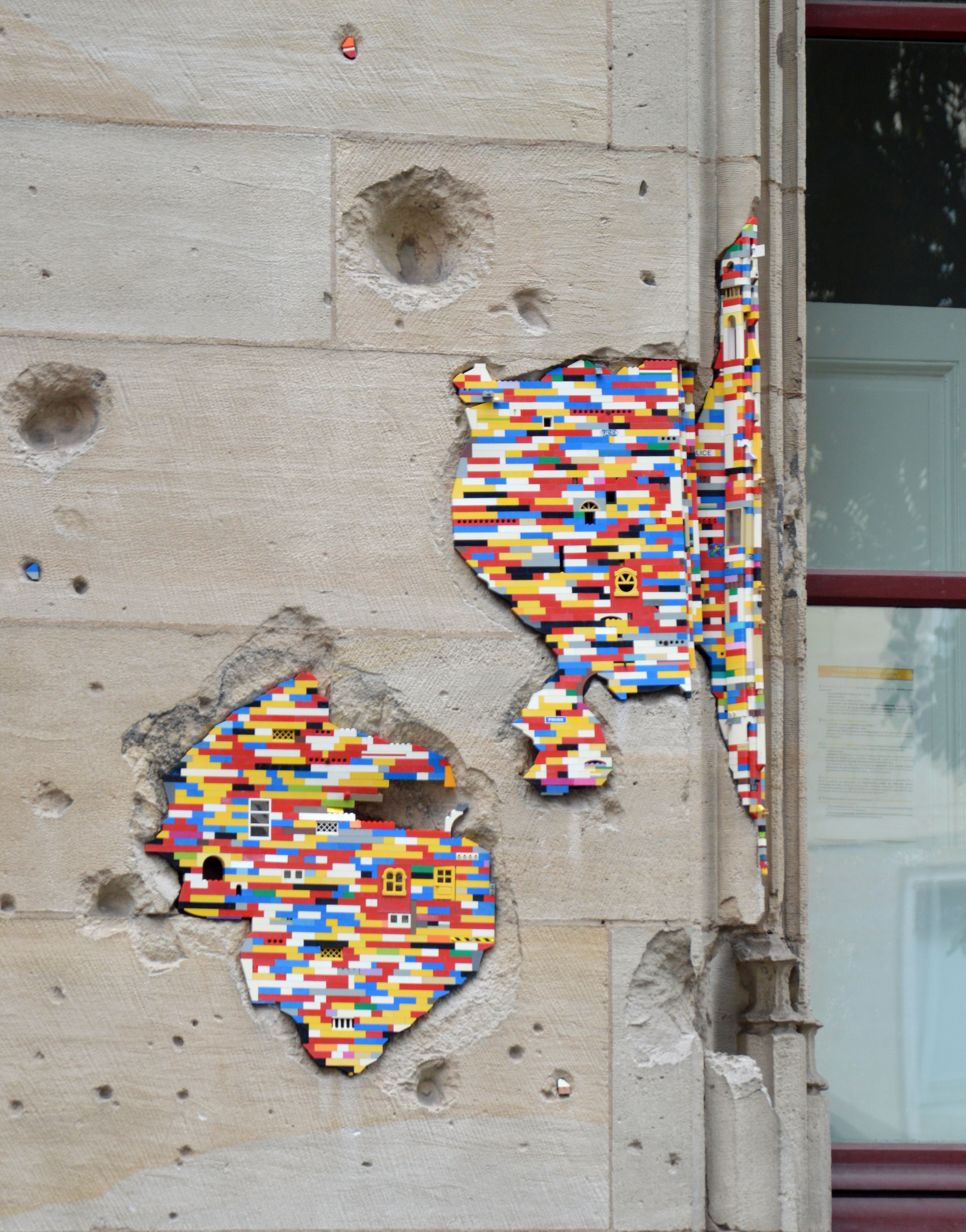
Jan Vormann's installation 'Dispatchwork', installed in 2024.

While the neo-Gothic sections of the building survived the bombing, they still show the scars as a tribute to the victims and a reminder of the city's sacrifice during the Liberation of France. The installation of Jan Vormann in 2020 stirred up controversy.

== Staircase construction (1902–1904) ==
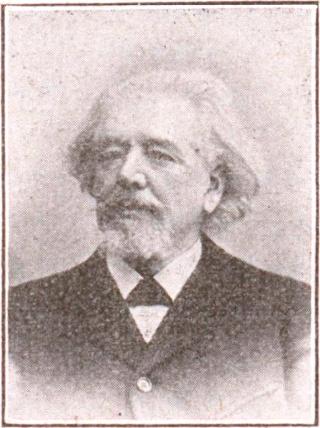
Antoine Paul Selmersheim (1840–1916) photographed in 1916 by Charles Ogerau.

In the early 20th century, efforts were made to restore the original staircase of the Salle des procureurs along Rue aux Juifs. Threatened with collapse, the original staircase, built in 1531 by Jean Delarue and Étienne Guiffart, disappeared in the 1830s, replaced by a neo-Gothic design by Henri Charles Grégoire. Drawings from 1824 by Richard Parkes Bonington (now housed at the Yale Center for British Art), served as the bases for the restoration project led by architect Lucien Lefort in 1902, sparking controversy known as the "staircase affair." In response to public outcry, the commission of historical monuments was forced to approve the demolition of the staircase and its replacement with a new one. The task was assigned to Paul Selmersheim, the inspector general of historical monuments since 1885.

The new construction, with its polygonal shape, faced strong criticism from the people of Rouen due to the reconstruction of part of the crenellated wall, which had been missing since 1836. The critics argued that it obscured the rich ornamentation of the House facades. Despite defenders pointing to the identical wall of the Hôtel de Cluny in Paris, their voices went unheard. During this period, the staircases of Henri Charles Grégoire and Lucien Lefort coexisted in an unusual manner, cluttering the western part of the courtyard with their size.

In August 1903, a general dismantling process began, and the crenellated wall was covered with graffiti such as "Down with the wall", "Please urinate while passing", and "Lefort is weak."

Paul Selmersheim, responsible for dismantling and rebuilding the choir and transept of the Basilique of Saint-Urbain of Troyes, used his experience to design a vaulted porch with a suspended flight in a Champagne neo-Gothic style. This unconventional choice enabled him to create an airy architecture that met the aesthetic preferences of the people of Rouen and resolved the controversy.

== Architecture ==
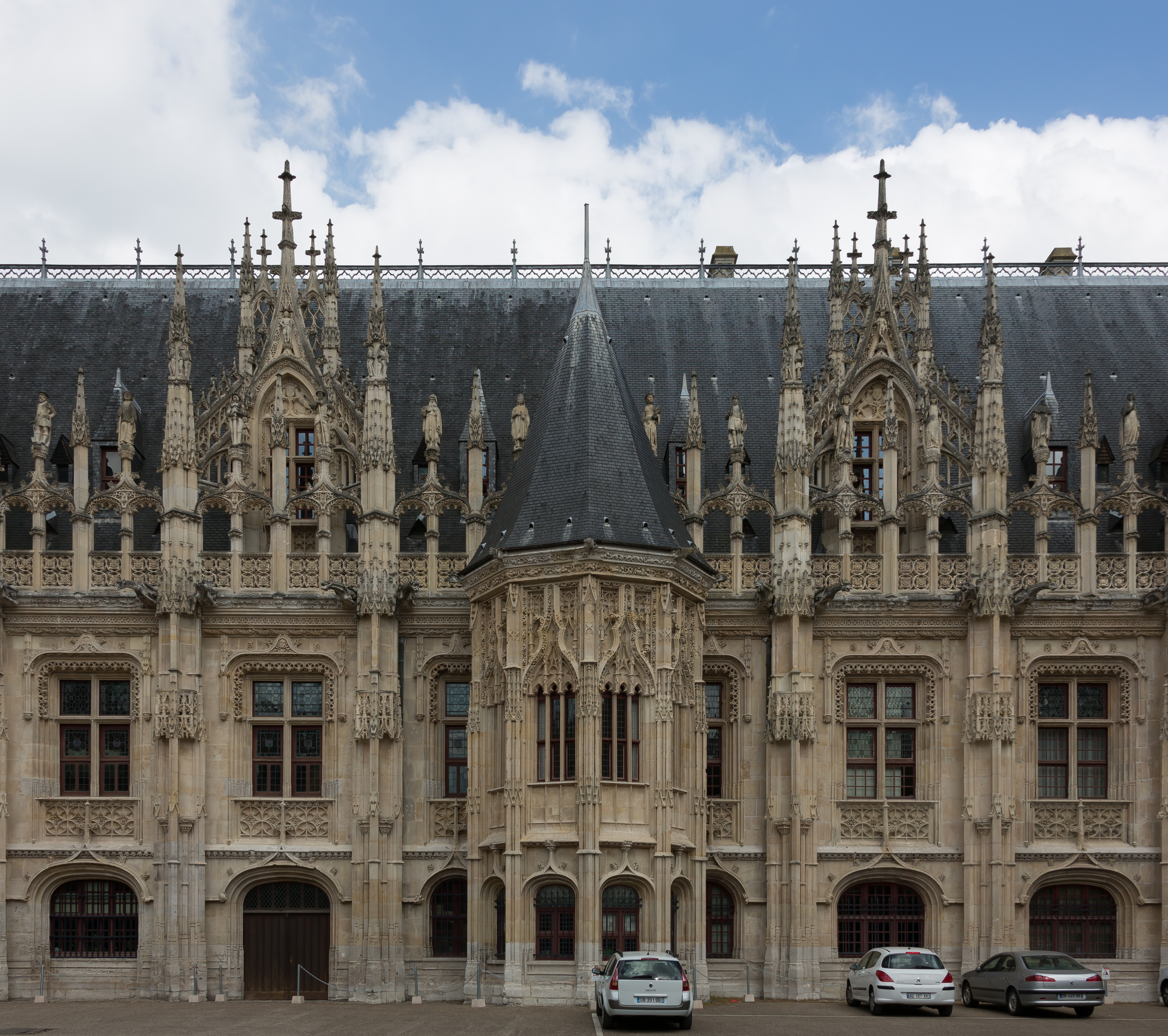
The former Royal Palace, in the center of the building, was mainly built between 1507 and 1517 in the Louis XII style.

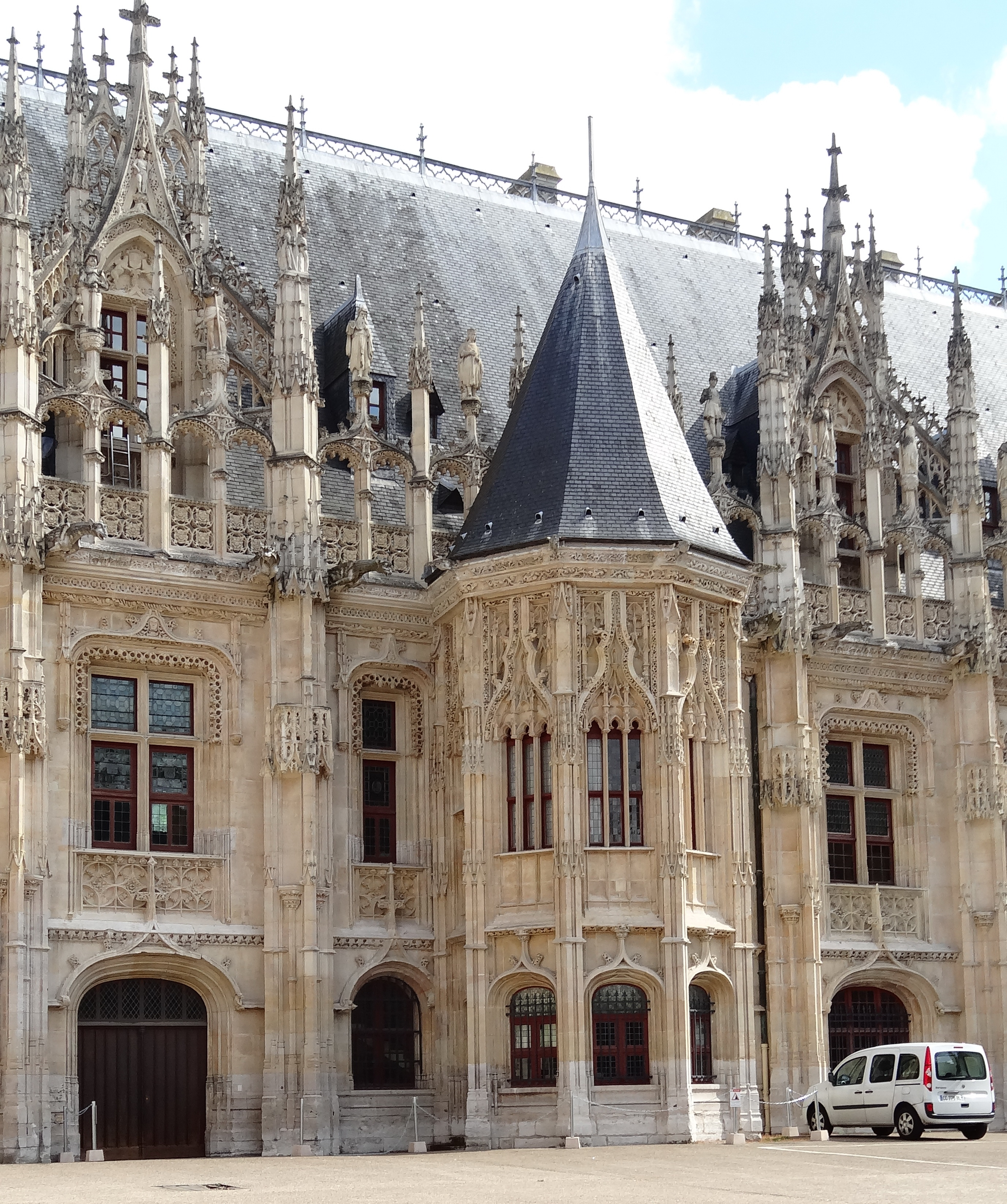
Forefront pavilion of the former Royal Palace, central body of the building (1507–1517).

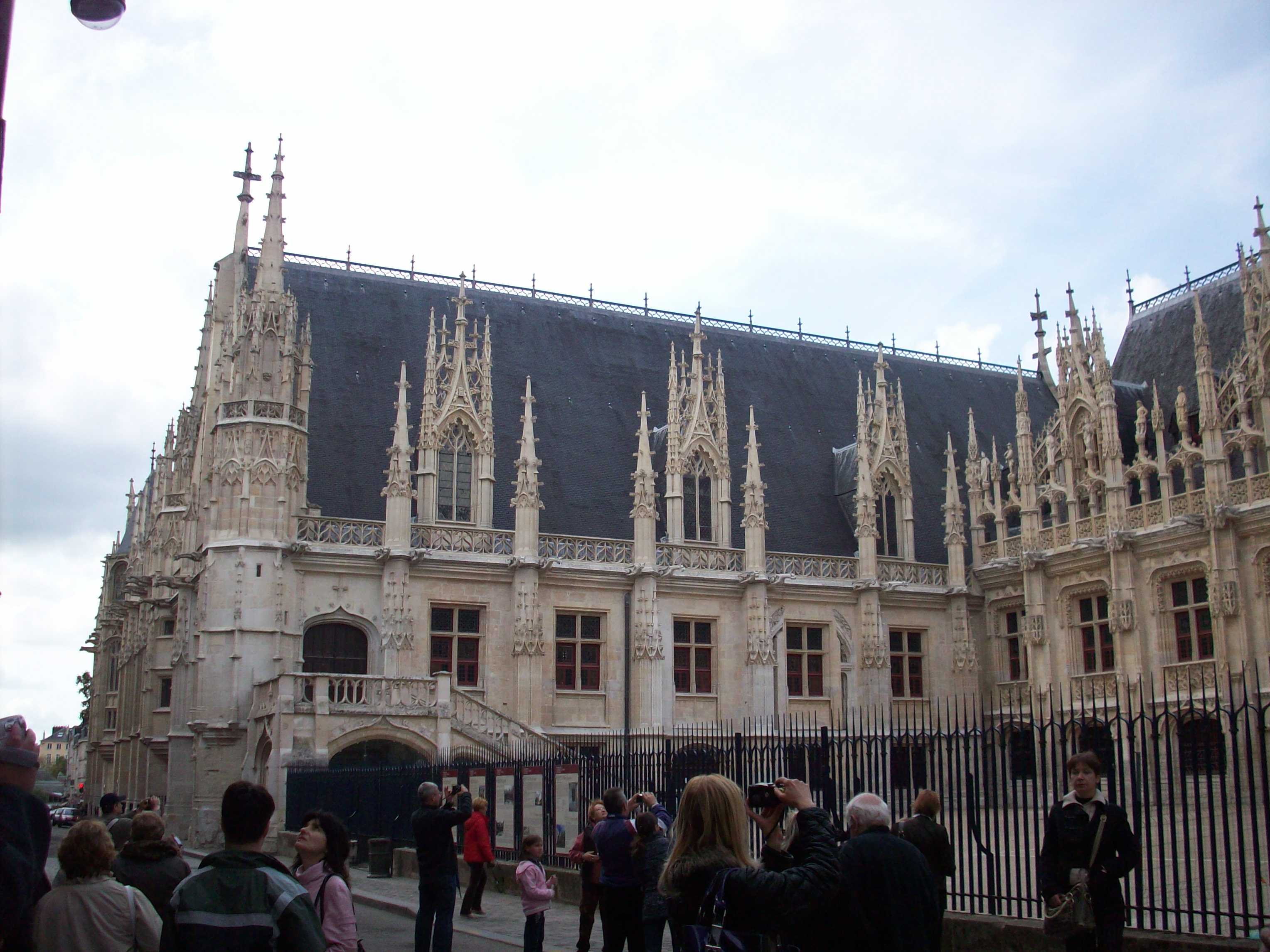
The West wing, built between 1499 and 1507, with its flamboyant Gothic style bell tower.

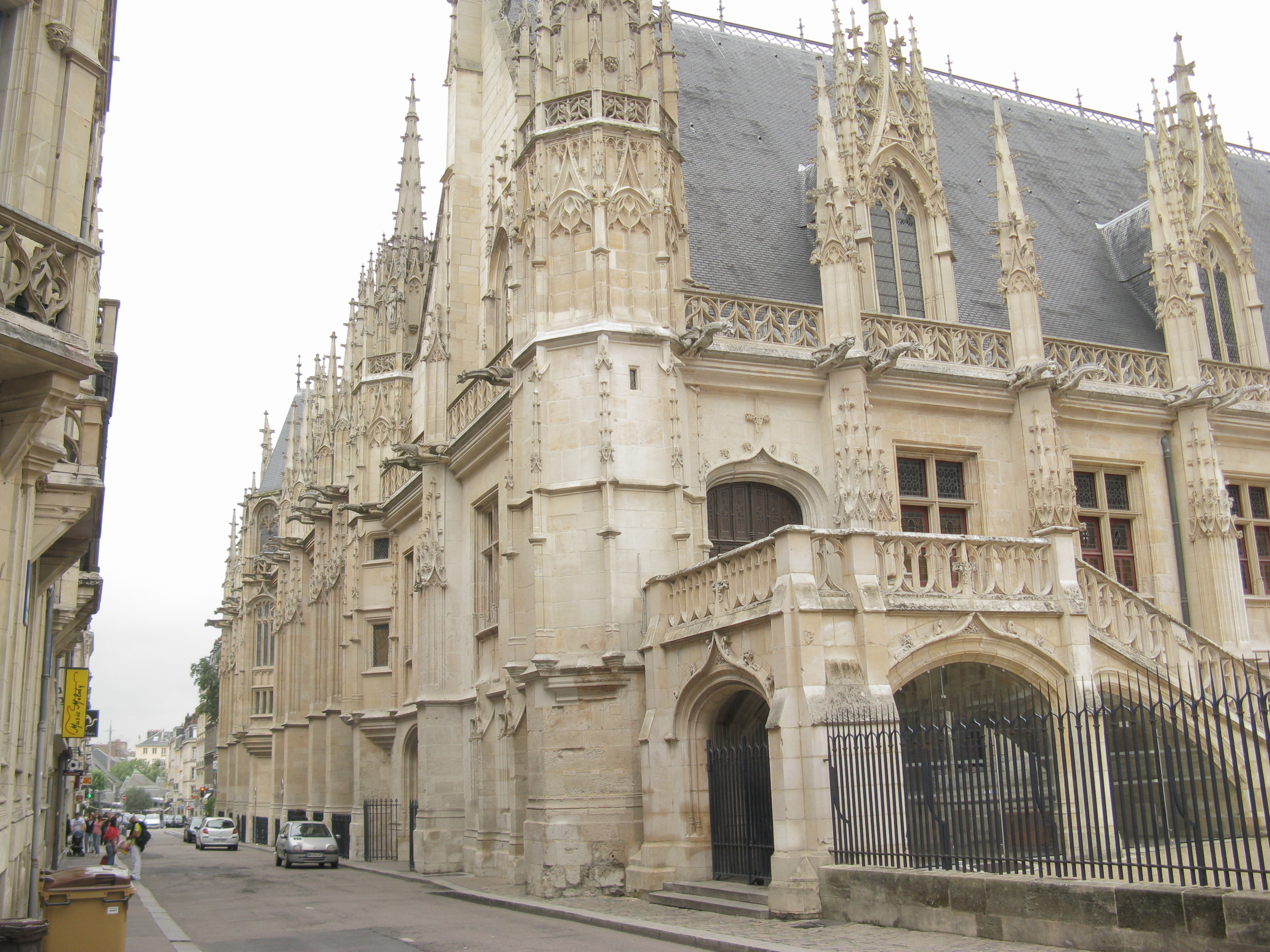
The West wing, built between 1499 and 1507, with its flamboyant Gothic style bell tower flanked by a neo-Gothic staircase.

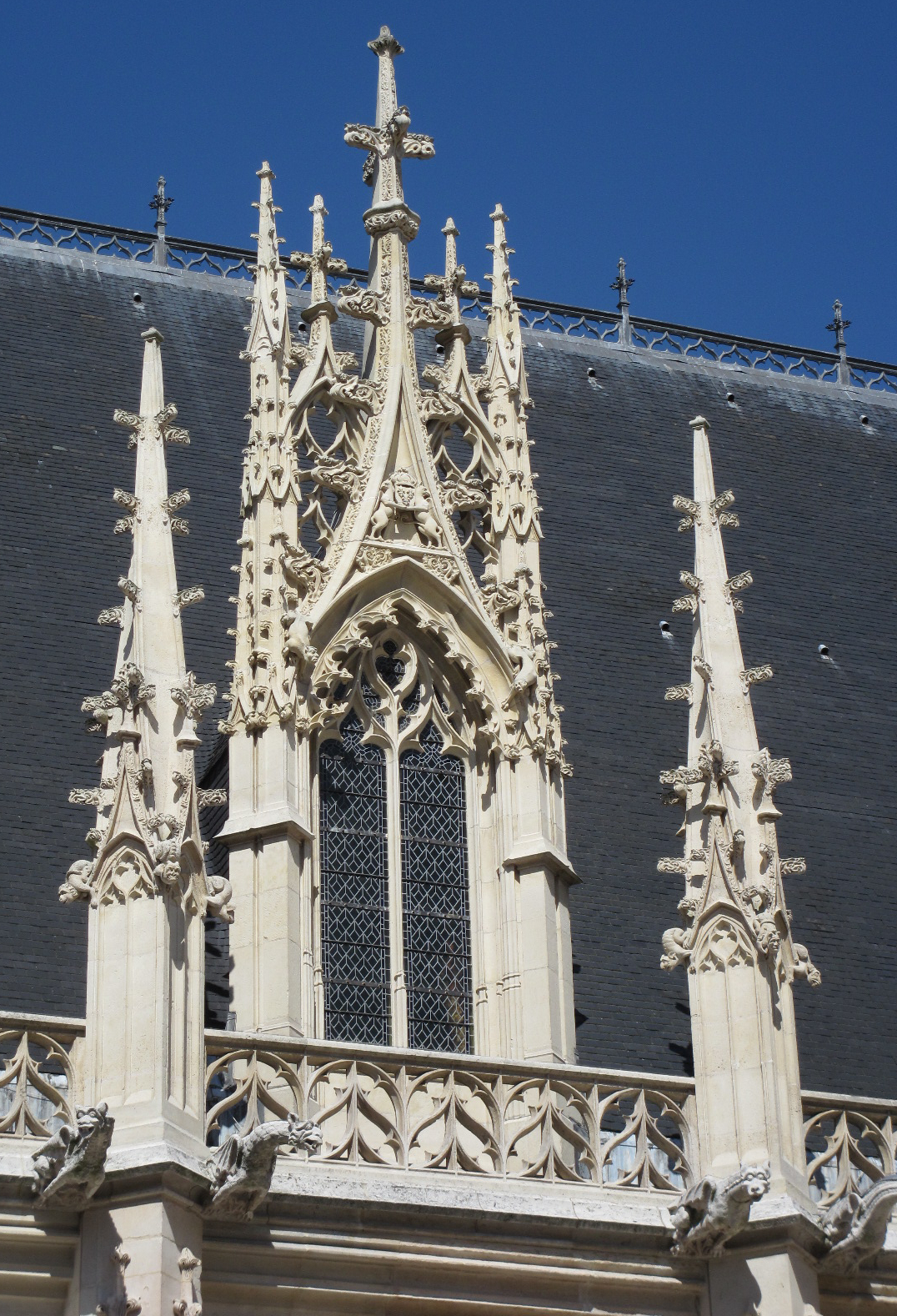
Flamboyant Gothic style dormer window overlooking the West wing (1499–1507).

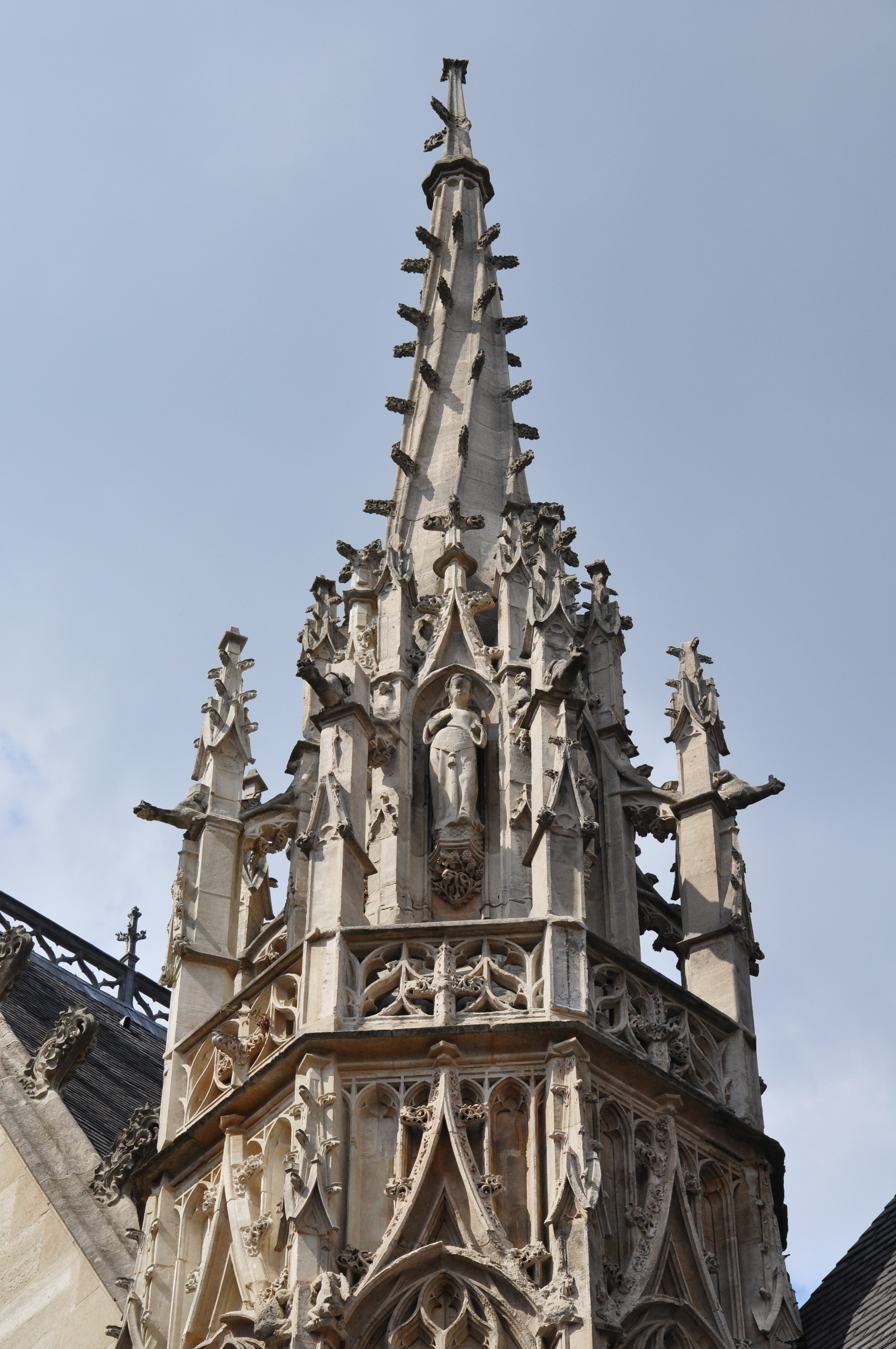
The flamboyant Gothic style bell tower (1499–1507).

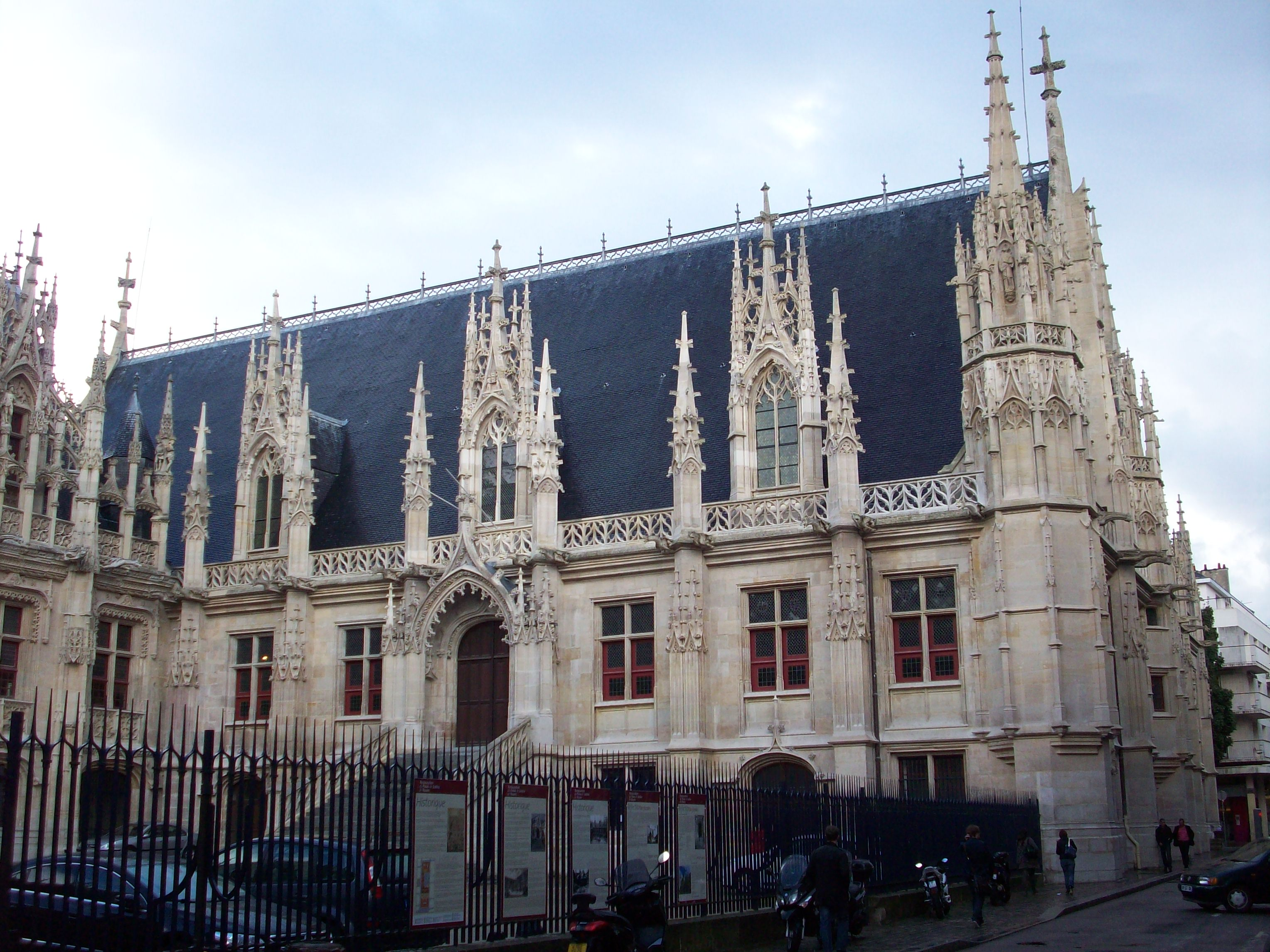
The East wing in neo-Gothic style (late 19th century).

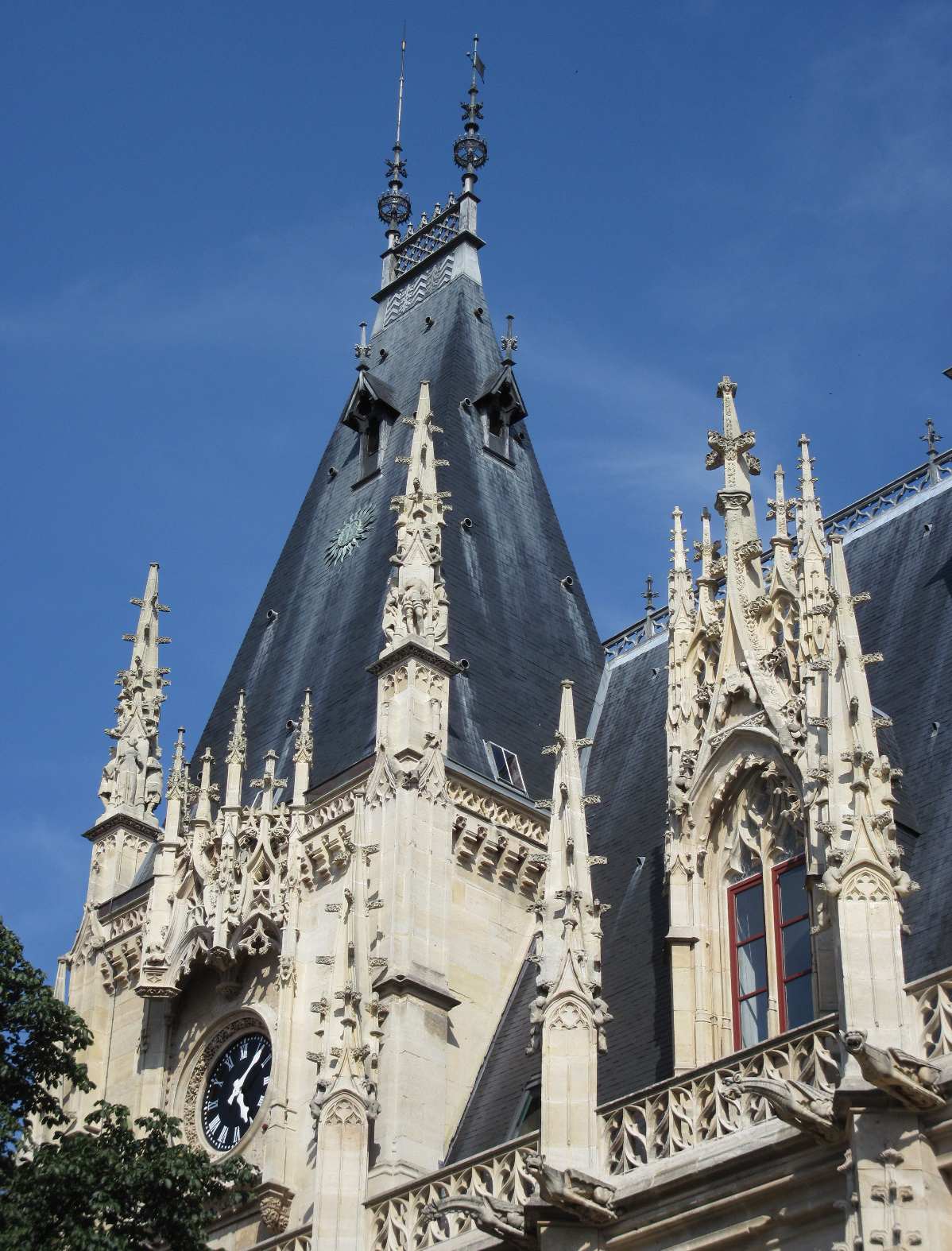
The clock tower, built in neo-Gothic style (1885).

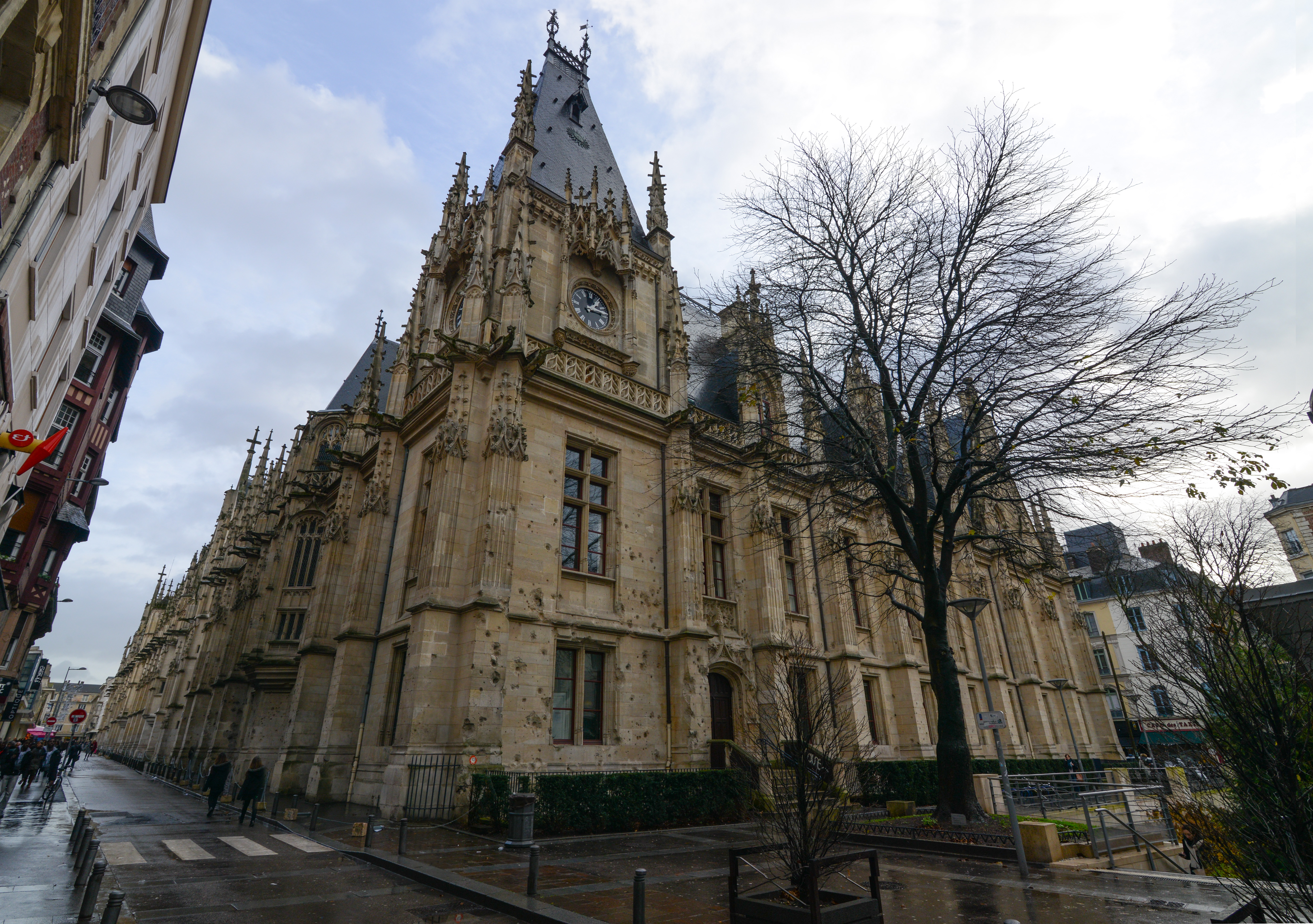
Facade with clock tower, built in neo-Gothic style (1885).

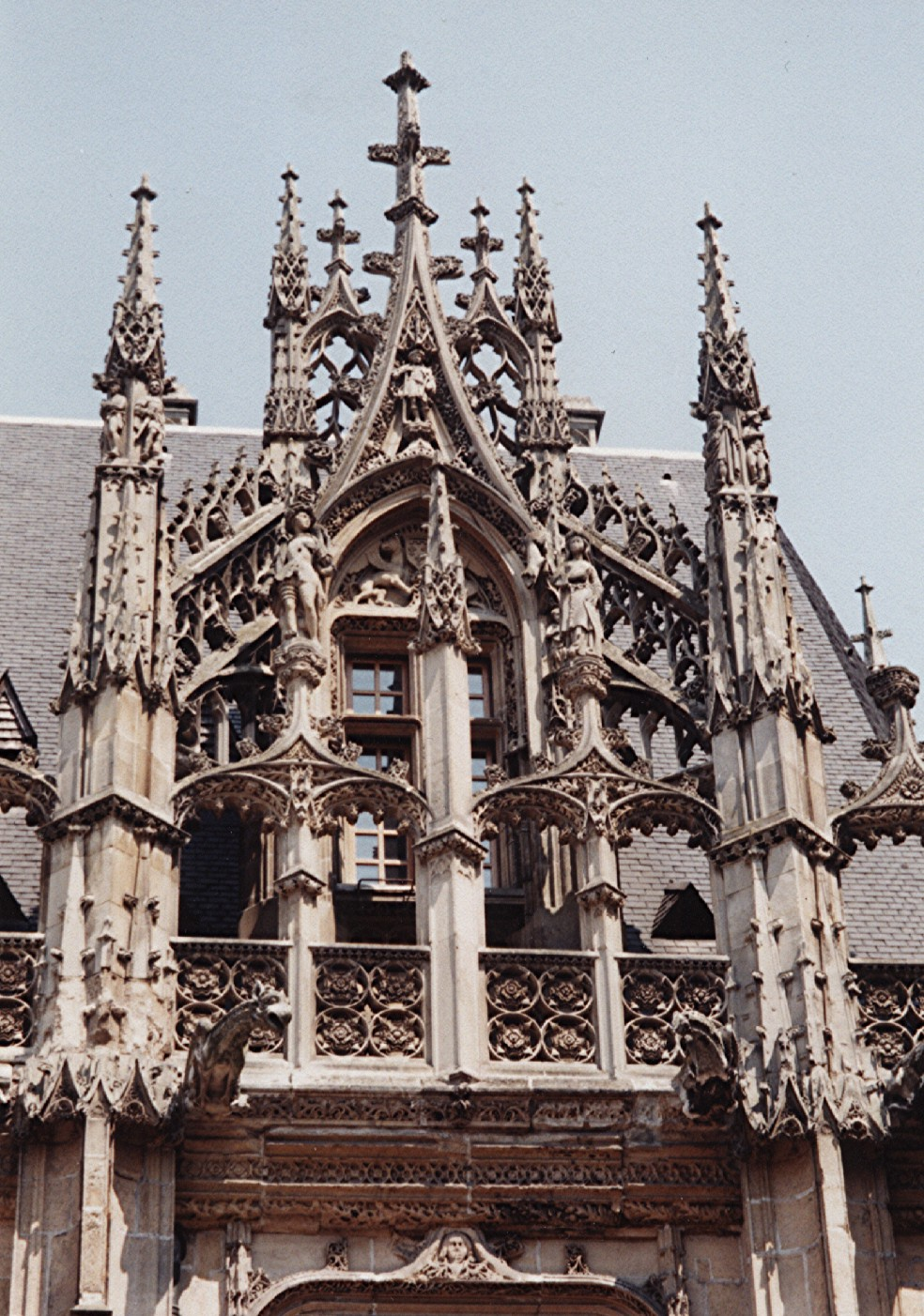
Dormer window, clerestory and balustrade in the Louis XII style, rising from the base of the roof of the central body of the former Palais royal in 1508 (1499–1517).

The Courthouse is a rare excample of civil Gothic architecture from the late Middle Ages in France. The building's wide facade is monumental, reflecting the post-Hundred Years' War. There was a clear intention to impress and assert urban power by drawing inspiration from the architectural style of religious buildings.

Construction work began around 1499 with the west wing, located to the left of the current ensemble. This building originally served as the Neuf Marché palace and still retains a medieval charm with its flamboyant Gothic style facade. The facade features elaborate ornamentation on multiple levels, but it avoids the decorative overload seen in the central part of the building.The roofline of this wing is adorned with pinnacles, gargoyles, and a balustrade with motifs of soufflets and mouchettes, whose curving and counter-curving motifs seem to evoke, as Michelet put it, "flames, hearts or tears." Crowning the ensemble, the flamboyant dormer windows already showcase scalloped arches surmounted by pierced arcades at their peaks. These elements will be further developed on the central wing of the building, which was constructed later. This French tradition of crowning facades with dormer windows later caught the admiration of Serlio when he arrived in France in 1540. He described that dormer windows "are great ornaments for buildings like a crown" and that the large slate-covered attics are "very pleasant and noble" architectural features.

The central body of the building, which was originally the Royal Palace of 1508, showcases a stylistic evolution with a transitional style between Gothic art and Early Renaissance. This style, known as the Louis XII style, is reminiscent of the Bourgtheroulde Hotel and the contemporary French Finance Office in its architecture.

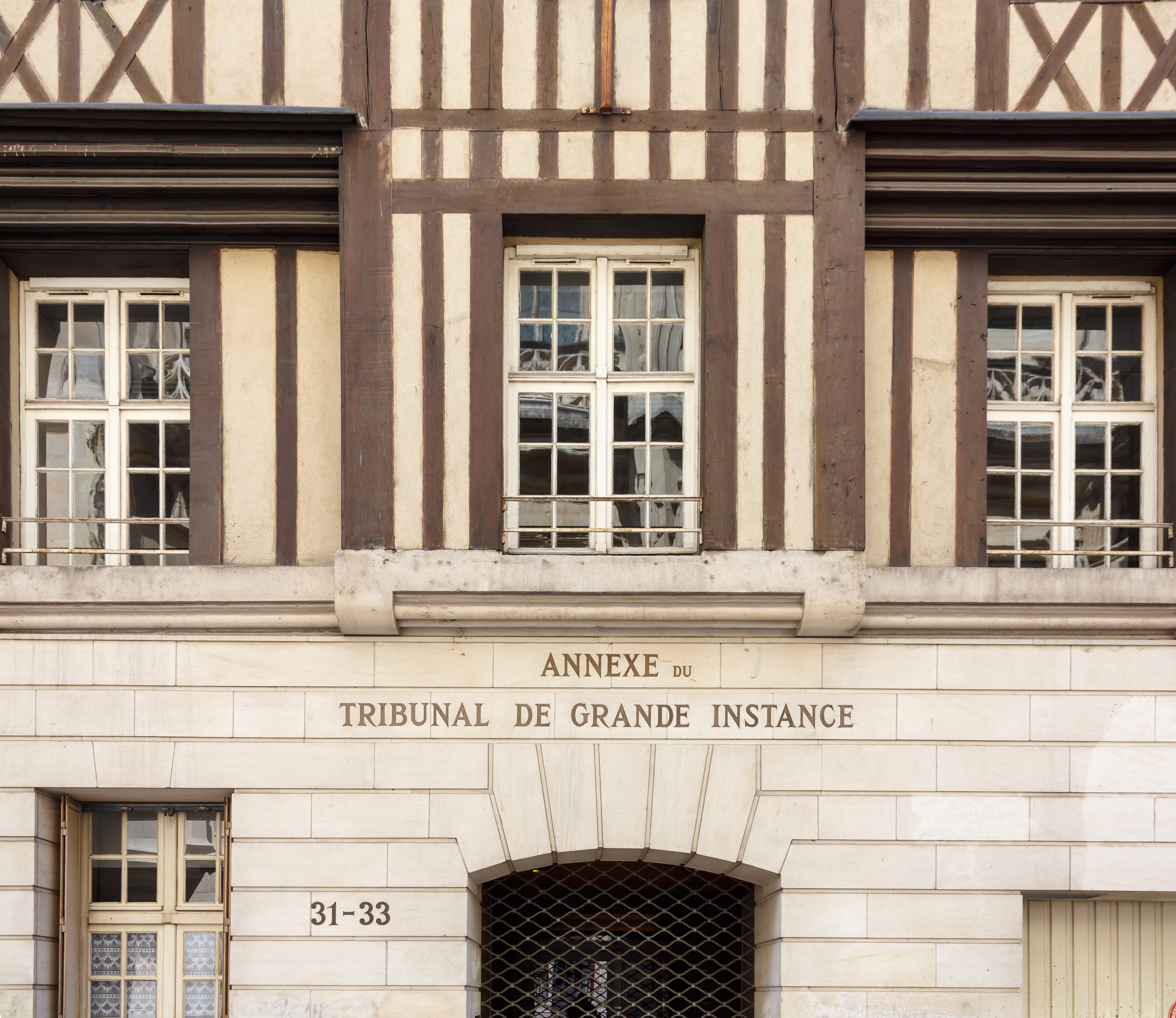
The Tribunal de grande instance annex, whose half-timbered architecture was restored after the war.

Becoming one of the true leitmotifs of this new architectural style, the expansion of windows on the facade conveys a sense of luxury, while their abundance adds to the grandeur of the House. By the late 14th century, the idea of buildings with large openings to the outside had already taken hold, as seen in Guillebert de Mets' description of Jacques Ducy's lavish Parisian residence. These widened windows not only bring in light but also improve ventilation, reflecting a growing concern for hygiene and quality of life (Bourgtheroulde Hotel). Following a model that emerged in the late 14th century, windows featured two large bays separated by a stone mullion in the shape of a cross, earning the name "cross windows". During that time, their interior wooden leaves were reinforced with metal hinges.

As can be seen in the Louis XII wing of the Château de Blois and the contemporary Compiegne Hotel de Ville, the pointed arch was replaced by the accolade or heel arch. This motif, which first appeared at the end of the 14th century, became very important in the courthouse of Rouen and almost always crowned the segmental arches with basket handles. The cushioning of these decorative arches consists of a pedicle ending in a fleuron: these floral pediments crown windows, pinnacles and ground floor portals. As in the portal of the Bourgtheroulde Hotel, a series of small three-lobed arches separated by hooks, called festoons, systematically decorate the intrados of the arches.

The wall is characterized by multiple levels of ornamentation, with decorative elements covering the surfaces and sometimes overwhelming the sculpture and architectural lines (Butter Tower in Rouen Cathedral). Influenced by Italian design, the superimposed openings in bays connected by moldings lead to highly ornamented dormer windows, which help organize the facades and anticipate the grid patterns of Early Renaissance exteriors. The windows feature stone embrasures, a noble material, with molded jambs and lintels in flat elliptical arches adorned with festoons (as in Châteaudun).

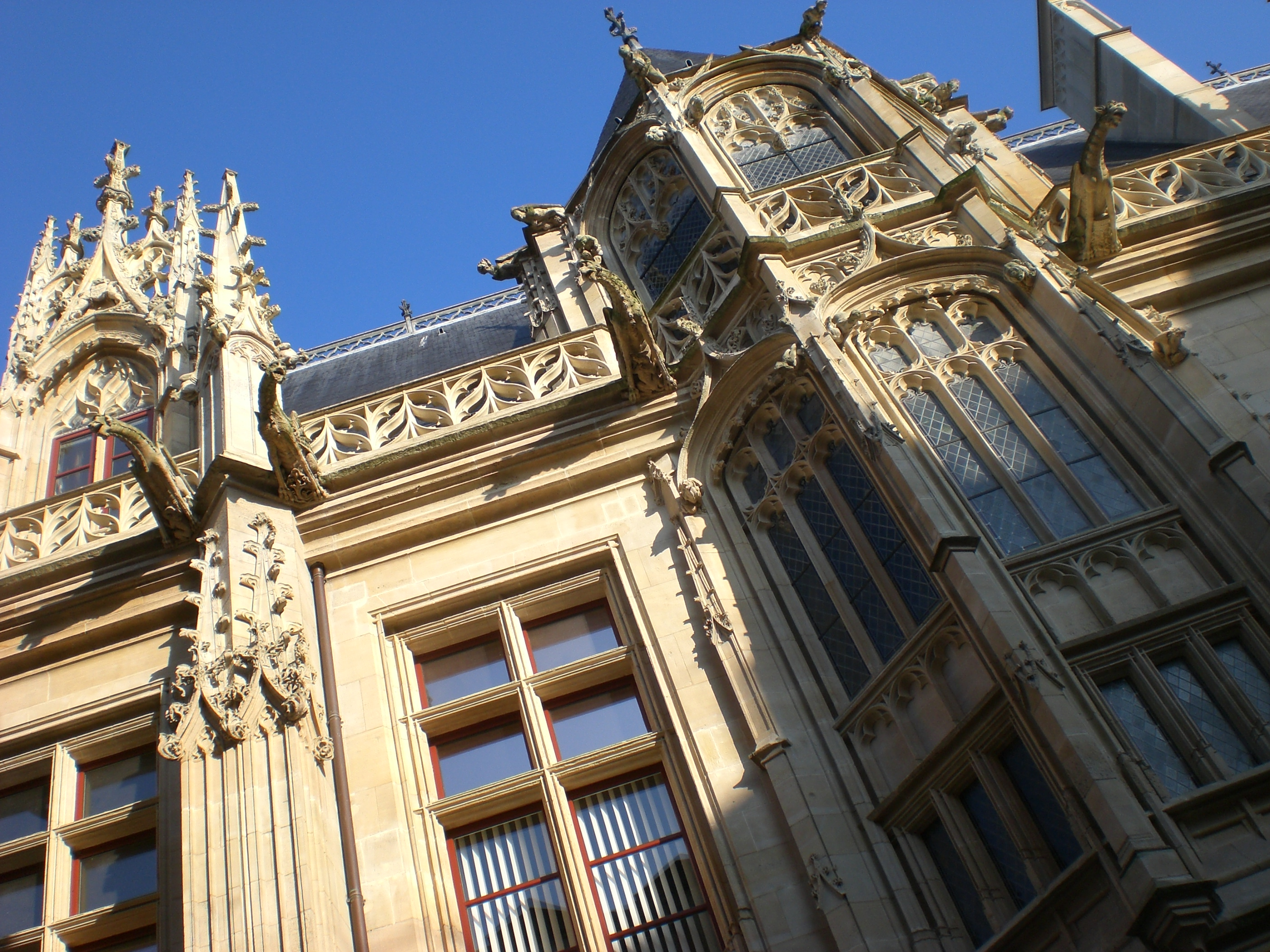
Detail of the neo-Gothic staircase on the Rue aux Juifs facade (late 19th c.).

The central pavilion, designed as an avant-corps, features the characteristic bell-shaped arch motif of the late 15th century. This arch comprises two curved elements that mimic the shape of a bell (Notre-Dame cathedral in Senlis, Maison des Têtes in Valence, etc.).

Dormer windows are another prominent feature of the Louis XII style. Elaborately adorned during this period, they are situated at the base of the roof, forming an intricate clerestory design of arcades and small flying buttresses that connect the gablet to the two flanking pinnacles. While still reflecting the flamboyant Gothic style, they also exhibit elements of Early Renaissance design in their tiered structure and the stylized motifs of the baluster they crown.

To replace the statues that were mostly lost during the Revolution, Joseph Brun (1792–1855), the winner of the first Prix de Rome in 1817, was tasked with depicting various social classes and personalities who played a role in the construction of the building, starting in 1836. The sculpted figures include Louis XII, Anne of Brittany, Cardinal d'Amboise, Francis I, an allegory of Justice, a farmer, a villager, a damsel, a lord, a monk, and an artist.

To the east of the courtyard, opposite the Procureurs' Hall, at the corner of Rue Saint-Lo, a new wing in classical style was developed in 1700 by Jacques II Millets-Désruisseaux. To complement this new ensemble, a residential building located on Place du Neuf Marché was started in 1739 by Pierre Jarry and completed in 1759 by Alexandre Dubois. This wing was almost completely destroyed when the main pediment of the building, then threatening to collapse, finally fell on April 1, 1812, at ten o'clock in the evening. The total reconstruction of this part of the Courthouse seemed inevitable when, in 1830, Arcisse de Caumont's work on Norman architecture was published, followed by the founding of the Society of Antiquaries of Normandy. Judged as a disparate and unpleasant ensemble, breaking the architectural balance of the entire monument, this part of the House was eventually replaced between 1833 and 1836 by spacious constructions, entirely in line with the style of the other two medieval wings. While it took up the flamboyant elevation of the west wing facing it, it nonetheless constitutes a neo-Gothic pastiche of the architecture of Roger Ango and Roulland Le Roux.

The facades of the clock tower on Rue Jeanne d'Arc and Rue aux Juifs deviate from the symmetrical constraints of the courtyard, showcasing originality. During the Restoration era, architects embraced the romantic aesthetic of neo-Gothic style, moving away from Greek and Roman influences. The Courthouse in Rouen stands out for its remarkable attention to various viewpoints, incorporating picturesque elements that enliven the overall design.

The staircase next to the medieval wing on the left side of the courtyard was rebuilt in 1904 by the architect Paul Selmersheim in the Champagne neo-Gothic style. This reconstruction followed the controversy surrounding dismantling of the original work by architect Lucien Lefort in 1903.

Initially damaged during the bombing on April 19, 1944, known as the "Red Week," the most severe destruction occurred on August 26, just before the city's liberation. This bombing, caused by a targeting error, nearly obliterated the central residential building in the Louis XII style, due to a marker error. The building then had to be partially reconstructed. The almost complete completion of this meticulous restoration confirmed the classification of the building as a historical monument in 1977, with its final inscription in 1979.

== Interior ==
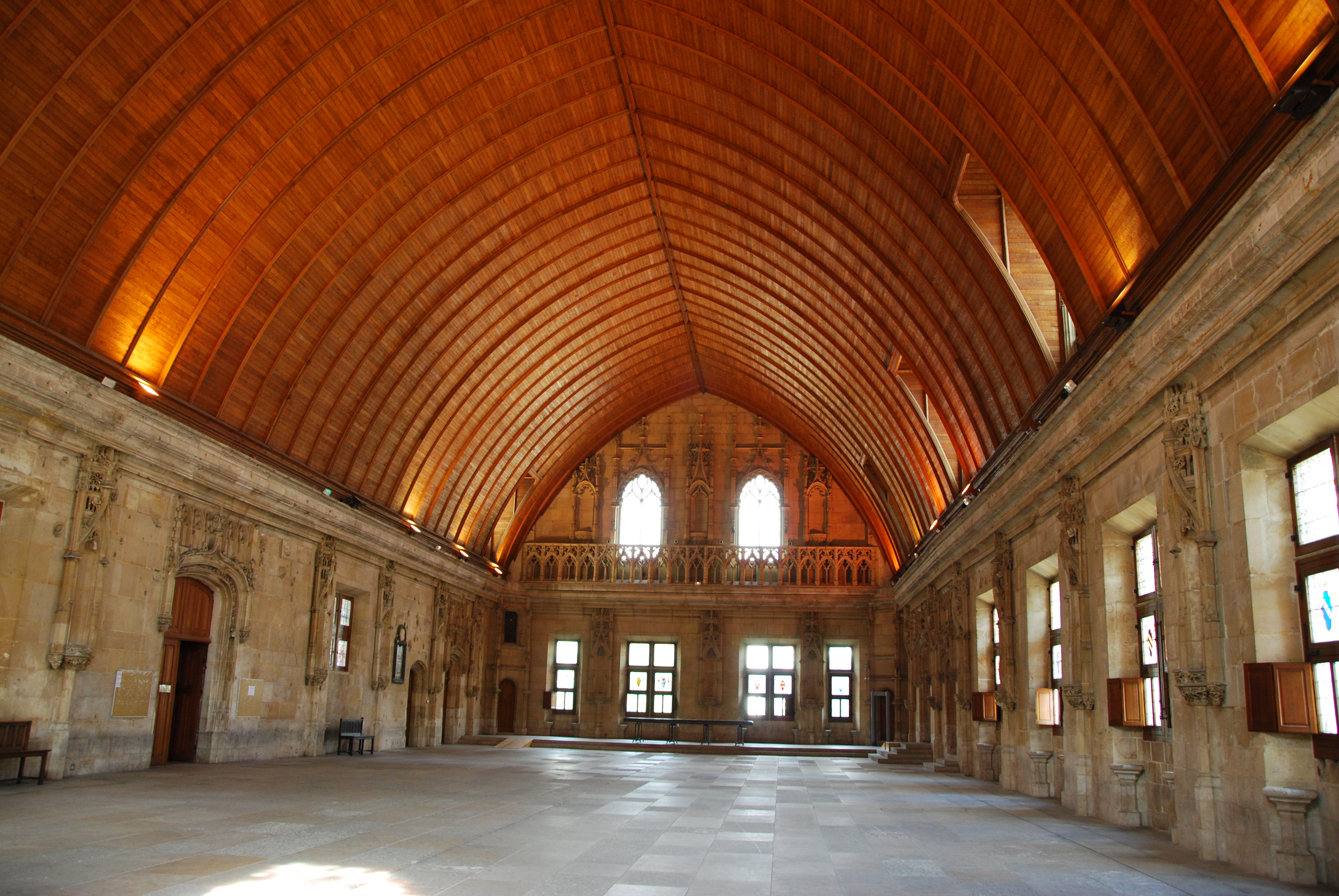
Great Hall, known as "Prosecutors," in the Louis XII style with its hull-shaped coffered ceiling (1507–1517).

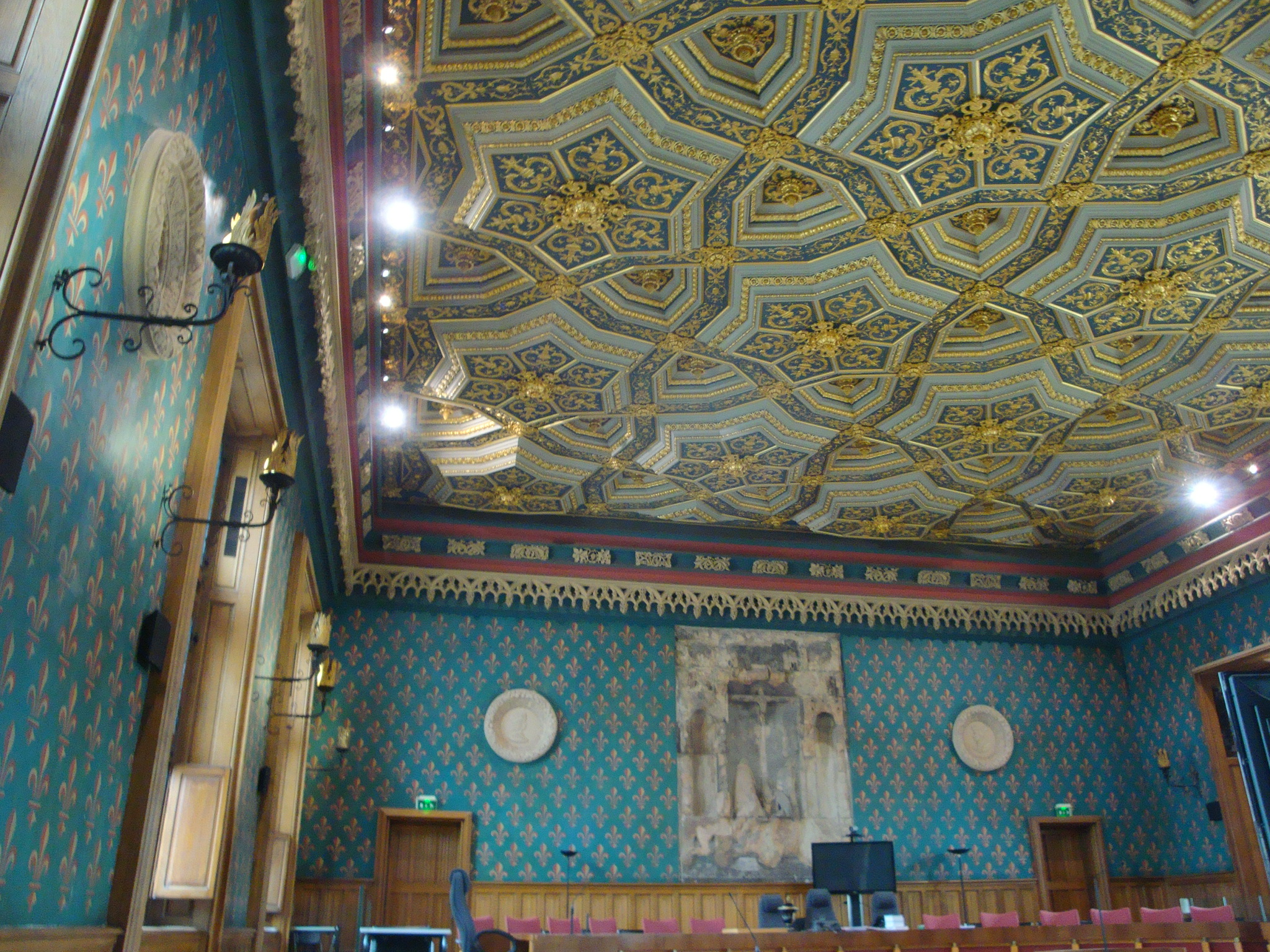
Reconstructed Assize Court with its Renaissance coffered ceiling.

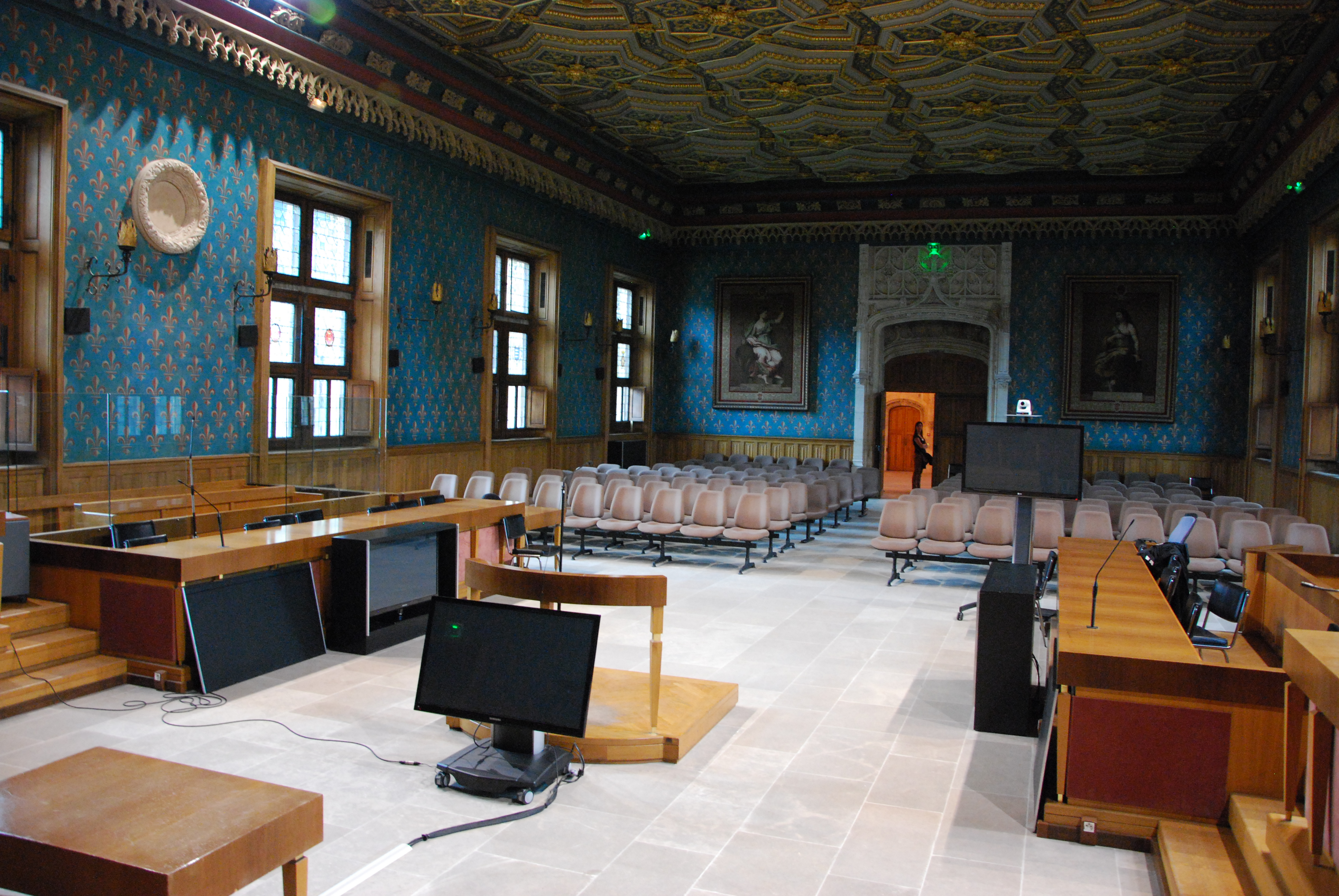
Reconstituted Assize Court with its Renaissance coffered ceiling.

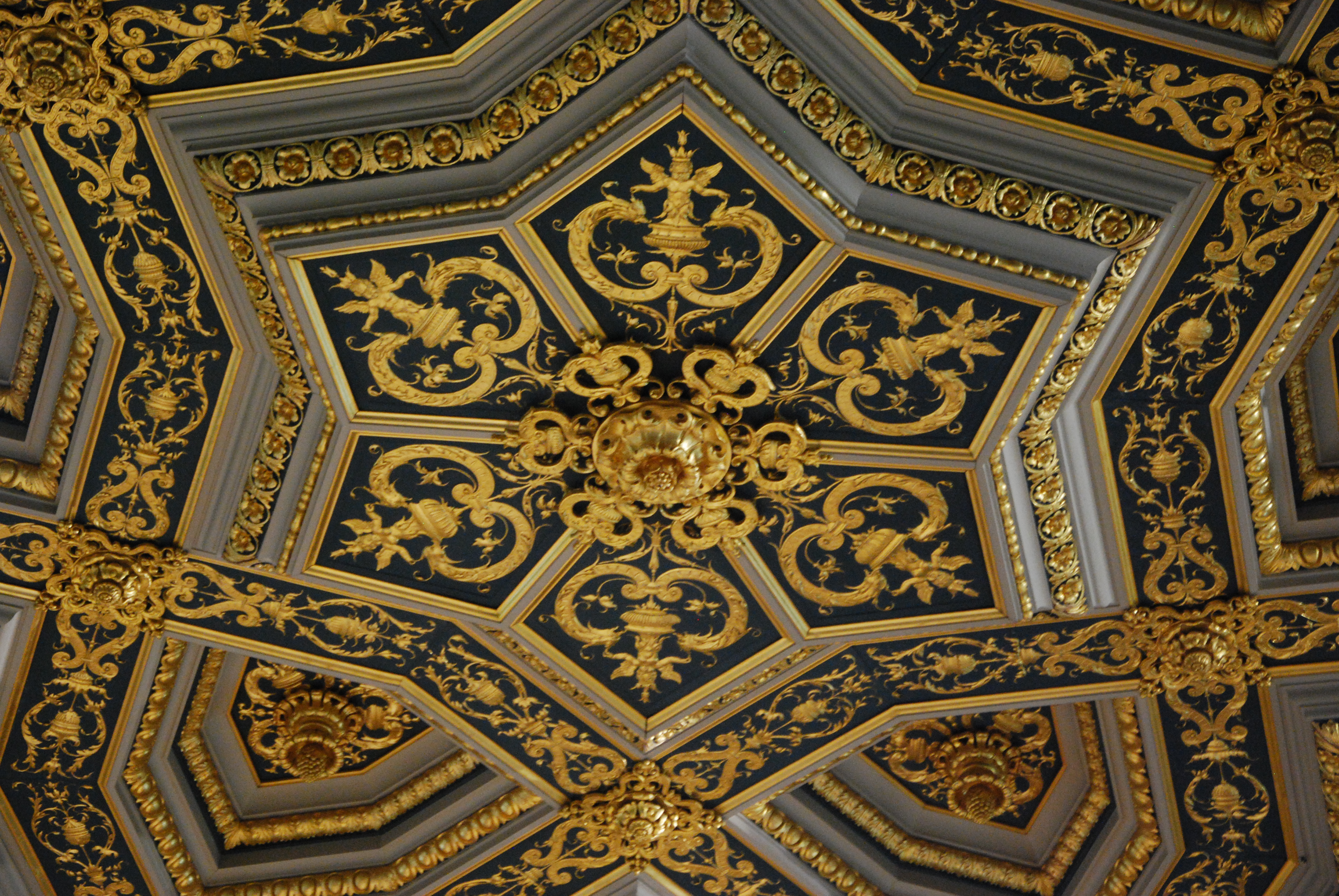
Detail of the Renaissance coffered ceiling in the Assize Court.

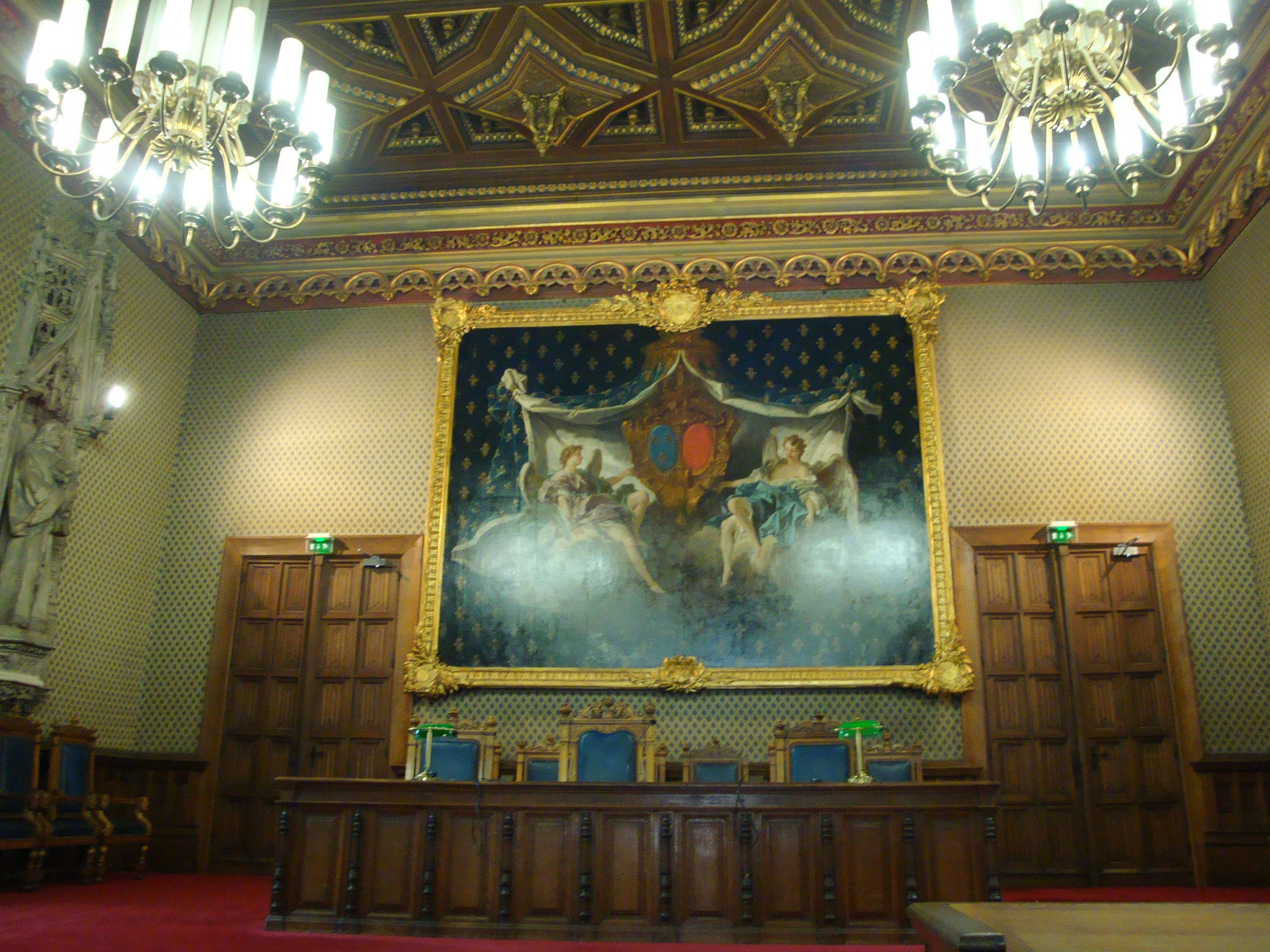
Council Chamber with its Renaissance coffered ceiling.

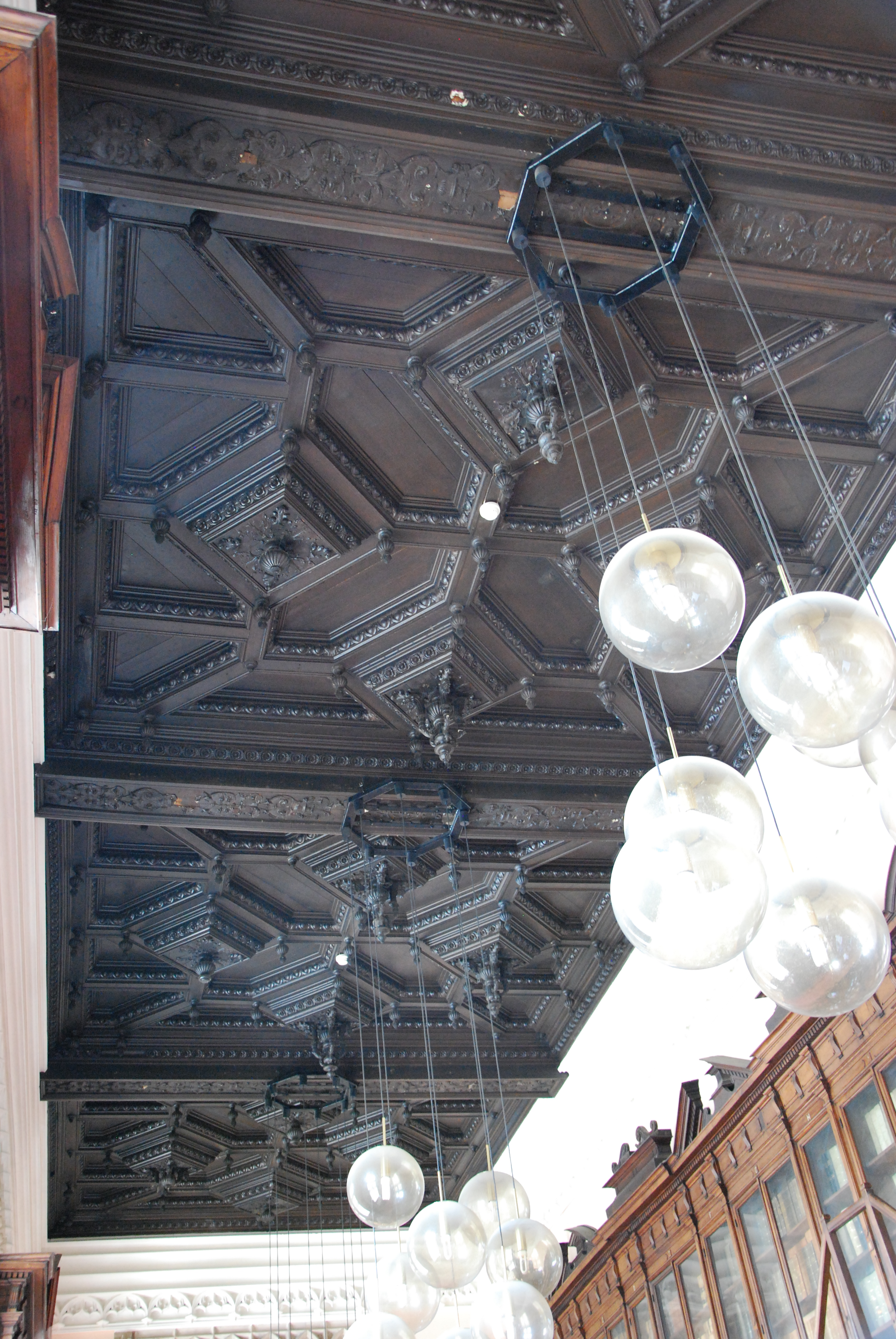
Library ceiling executed in Neo-Renaissance style.

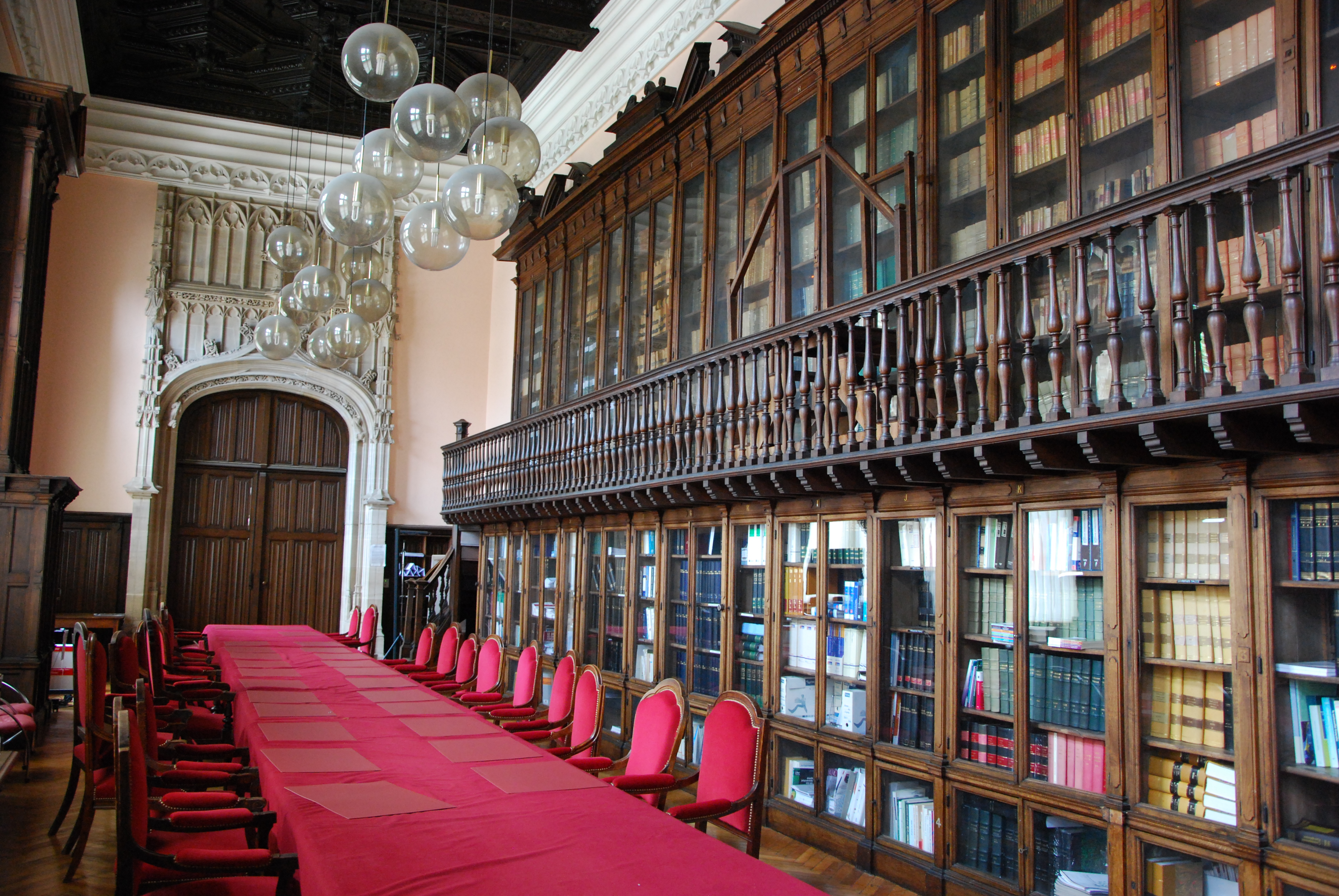
The interior decor of the library combines Neo-Gothic style with Neoclassicism.

In the central wing of the building, which corresponds to the former Royal Palace of Louis XII, the Great Chamber of the Parliament now serves as the seat of the Assize Court. It features a Renaissance-style coffered ceiling adorned with rosettes and gilded bronze ornaments. The chamber was completely destroyed during the bombing on August 26 that preceded the city's liberation. However, it was faithfully restored after the war using the same aged ebony-colored oak wood. At the end of this hall, overlooking the seats of the Assize Court, sculpted allegories of Strength and Justice accompany a crucified Christ.

In the nearby Council Chamber, several portraits of presidents and councilors of the Parliament of Normandy are displayed. A precious painting on a gold background, gifted by Louis XII, portrays a crucified Christ with two grieving holy women at his feet.

The western part of the building, which predates the main structure, was built from 1499 to serve as a meeting place for merchants. The ground floor houses the Concierge and former prisons, while a large external staircase built in 1904 by Paul Selmersheim provides access to the Salle des Procureurs or the Hall of Lost Steps. This is where Pierre Corneille conducted his pleadings as a lawyer. The hall occupies almost the entire first floor, measuring 48.72 meters long and 16.24 meters wide, and was built between 1507 and 1517 in the Louis XII style. During the bombing known as the "Red Week," on April 19, 1944, the hall was severely damaged. However, its immense vault was restored after the war to its original shape resembling an inverted ship's hull, with the nave consisting of a single flight unsupported by any pillar. The walls feature elegant niches without statues. At one end of the hall, a plaster model made in 1834 by David d'Angers serves as the last remnant of the statue of Pierre Corneille that once stood on the central platform of the stone bridge, which was destroyed in 1940. On the opposite end of the hall are the tombs of Claude Groulard, the first President of the Parliament of Normandy, and Barbe Guiffard, his wife, from the castle of Saint-Aubin-le-Cauf, near Dieppe.

To the east of the building, across from Procureurs' Hall on Rue Saint-Lo, a new classical-style wing was constructed in 1700 by Jacques II Millets-Désruisseaux. Inside, there was a ceiling painted by Jean Jouvenet, who, despite being paralyzed in his right hand, painted the Triumph of Justice using his left hand. This ensemble was completely destroyed when the main pediment of the building, which was at risk of collapsing, finally fell on April 1, 1812, at ten o'clock in the evening. This section of the Courthouse created a jarring contrast with the rest of the monument and was eventually replaced from 1833 to 1836 with spacious constructions that harmonized with the style of the other two medieval wings.

Le décor intérieur de la bibliothèque du Tribunal de Grande Instance mêle le style néogothique au néo-classicisme. Son plafond fut restitué après guerre dans son style néo-Renaissance originel.

The interior decor of the Tribunal de Grande Instance library combines Neo-Gothic and Neoclassical styles. The ceiling was restored to its original Neo-Renaissance style after the war.

== The Maison sublime of the Clos aux Juifs ==
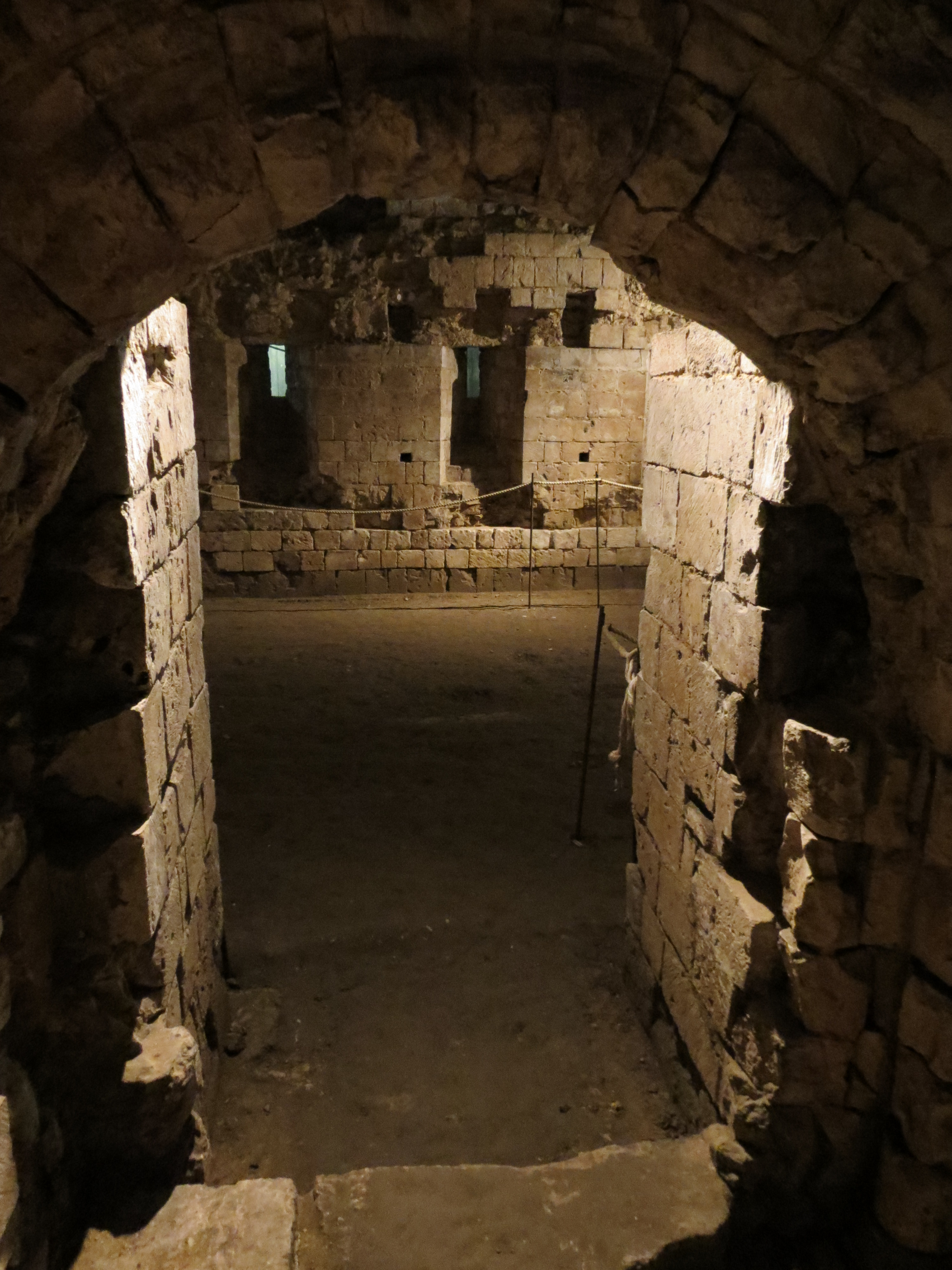
"La Maison sublime", access to the lower level.

Discovered in 1976 under the staircase of the East wing, to the right of the courtyard of honor of the Rouen Courthouse, the Maison Sublime is a rectangular monument measuring 14.14 m by 9.46 m. Dating back to 1100, this house was originally located in the Clos aux Juifs, the medieval quarter of the community.

The thick walls of this structure, preserved at a low height, bear a Hebrew inscription: "May this house be (always) sublime!" from the Book of Kings. Additionally, two column bases feature a sculpted lion of Judah depicted as two lions lying on their backs united to a single head, and a dragon. This site is a rare example of Romanesque architecture in Rouen.

Three hypotheses exist regarding this ensemble. It could be either:

1. A civil building, referred to as the "Hall with a floor";
2. A synagogue, based on its shapes, orientation, and graffiti;
3. A yeshiva, a high rabbinical school (presumed to have a synagogue), a theory now favored due to the presence of a low floor similar to the libraries of small Cistercian monasteries, where the first floor was used for student gatherings. Archive documents indicate that a yeshiva in the "Clos aux Juifs" included prominent figures of medieval Judaism such as Rashbam, the grandson of Rashi of Troyes, and Abraham ibn Ezra.

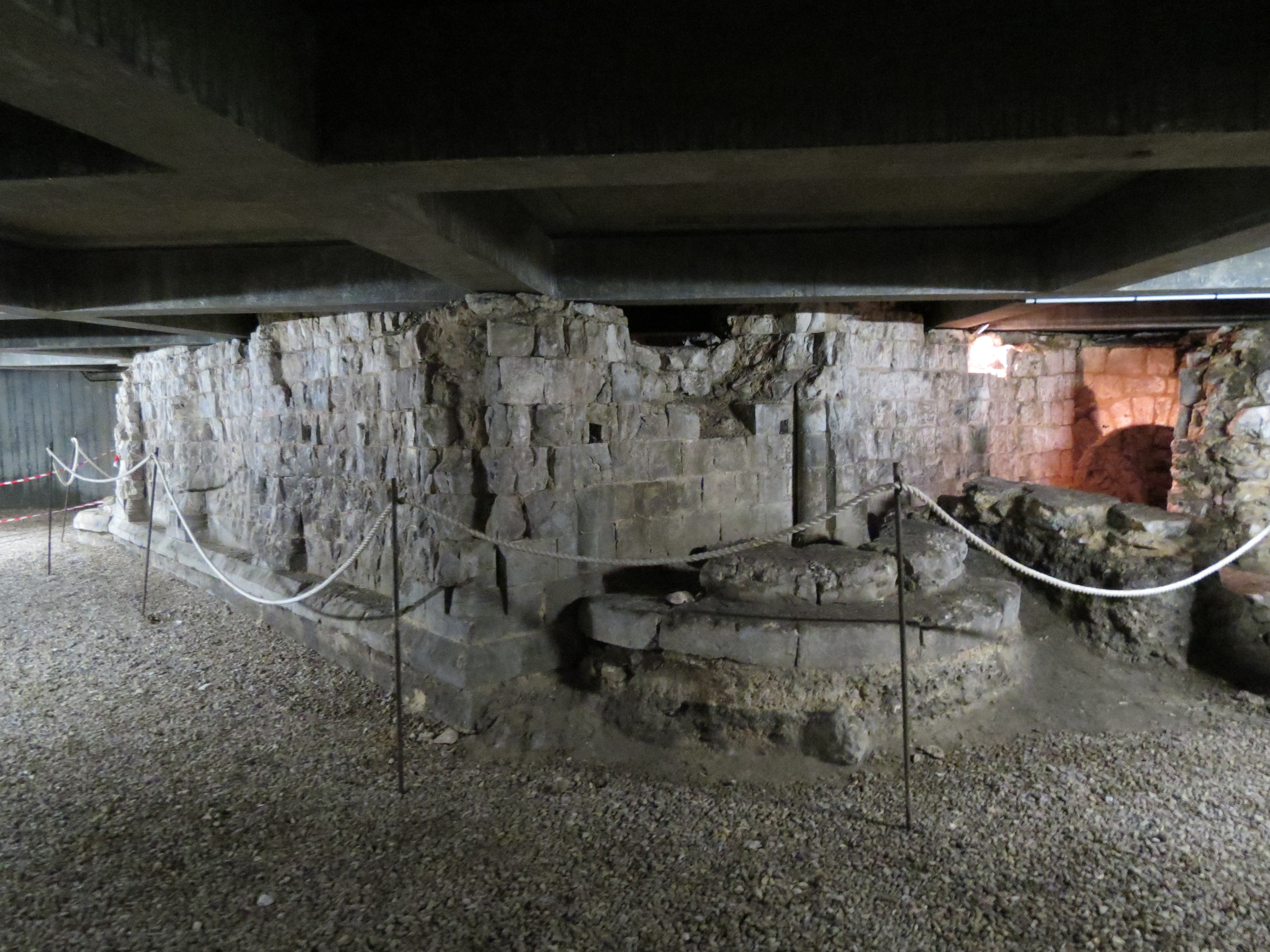
Entrance to the south wall of the "Maison sublime," a former yeshivah.

"Schools of this type existed in the Middle Ages (Romanesque style) in other cities, but this is the only one preserved in France," said the delegate of the association of the Maison Sublime (LMSR).

Dating back to Ancient Rome, Rouen was home to over 5,000 Jews in 1306, residing in a district situated between the current rue du Gros-Horloge (formerly rue Courvoiserie) and rue des Cannes, at the heart of the city. The expulsion of the Jews from France by Philippe Le Bel in the same year led to the cessation of its operations, and shortly after, the Jewish quarter of Rouen. was destroyed.

In 1499, the construction of the Courthouse in the former Jewish quarter of the city resulted in the destruction of the upper floors of the buildings on the current Rue aux Juifs. This led to the burying of the first level of the "Maison sublime" under the courtyard of the House.

Discovered in 1976, the Maison Sublime, an important monument of medieval Jewish life in Rouen, faced demolition in July 1982 by the Ministry of Justice, its owner. Despite efforts by various French organizations, including the city of Rouen, two-thirds of the building were destroyed to make way for offices for the Tribunal de Grande Instance and a parking lot in the basement.

However, in 2022, the Maison Sublime reopened to the public with the support of the Rouen Tourist Office.

== The Blacks' Depot ==
In the late 18th century, the prisons of the Conciergerie, situated on the ground floor of the House, functioned as a "Blacks' Depot." This facility was used to detain slaves, at their owners' expense, before their compulsory repatriation to the colonies following training in specific trades.

The presence of Black people in Rouen is a social reality connected to colonial trade and the slave trade. In 1779, the Minister of the Navy, Sartine, established a "police for Blacks" to repatriate many of these forced migrants to the Antilles.

== Galleries ==
=== The gargoyles and their temperaments ===
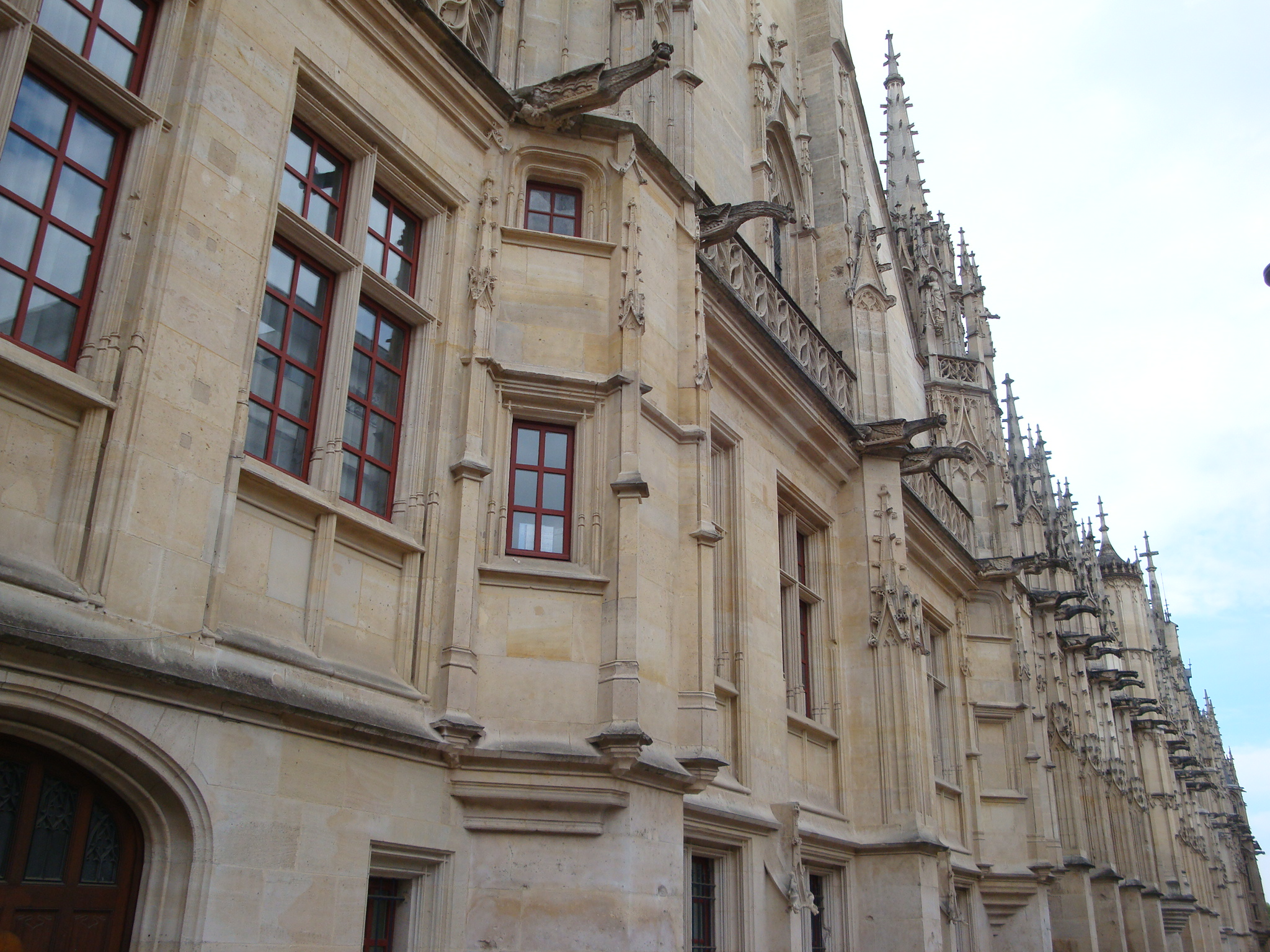
Detail of the alignment of gargoyles on the neo-Gothic facade of rue aux Juifs (late 19th century).

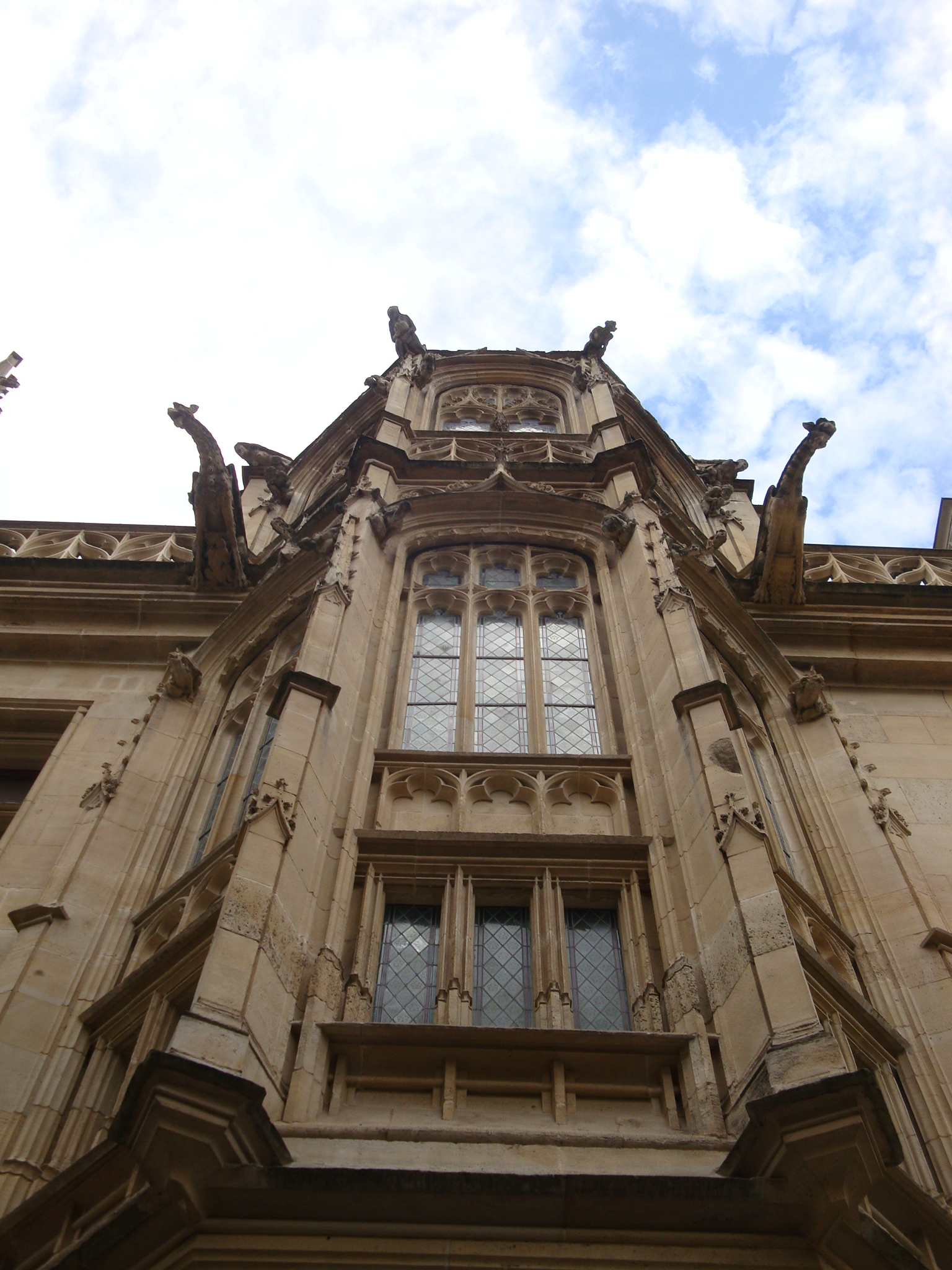
Gargoyles of the neo-Gothic staircase of rue aux Juifs (late 19th century).

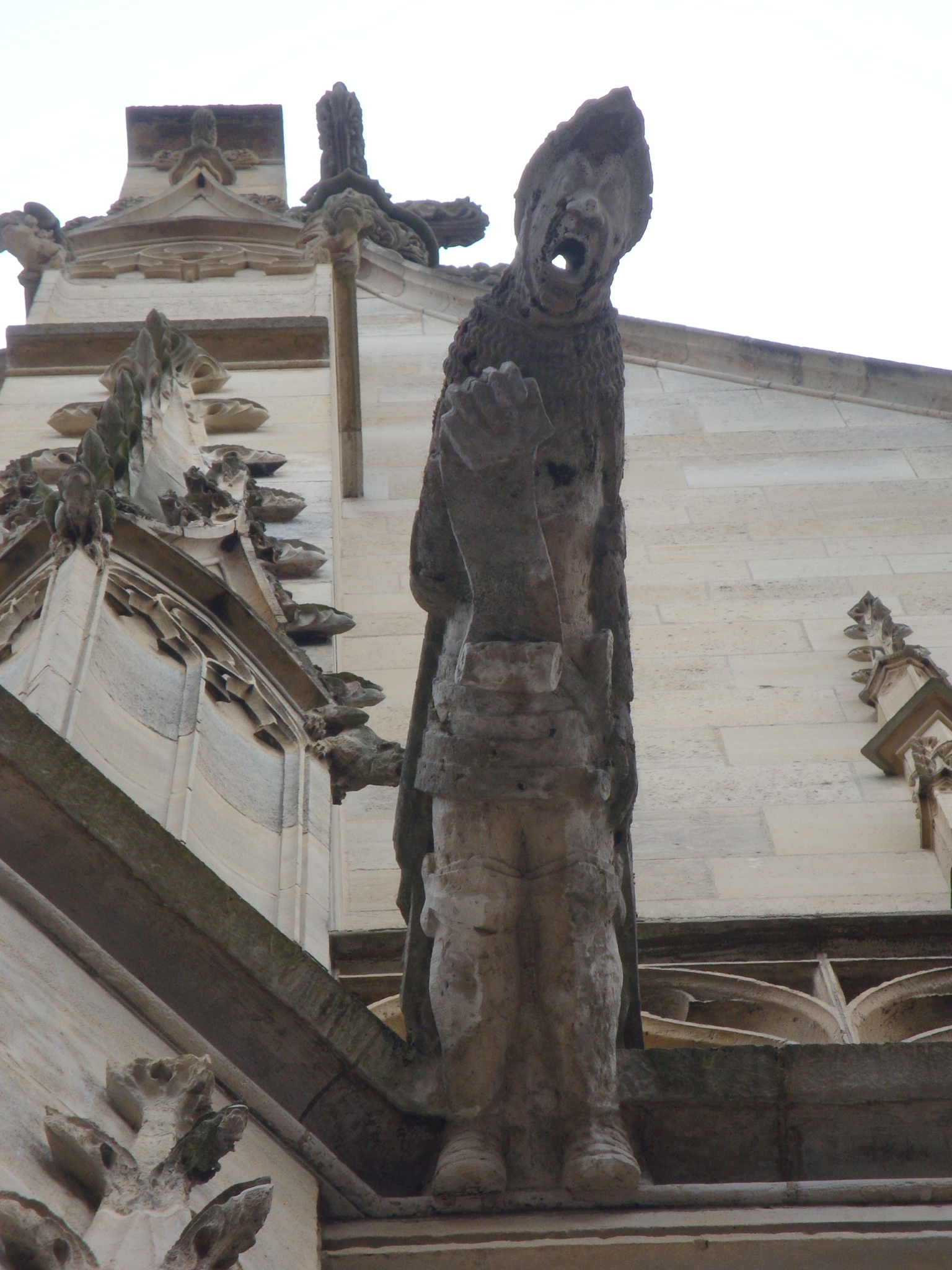
The Gargoyle known as The Herald.

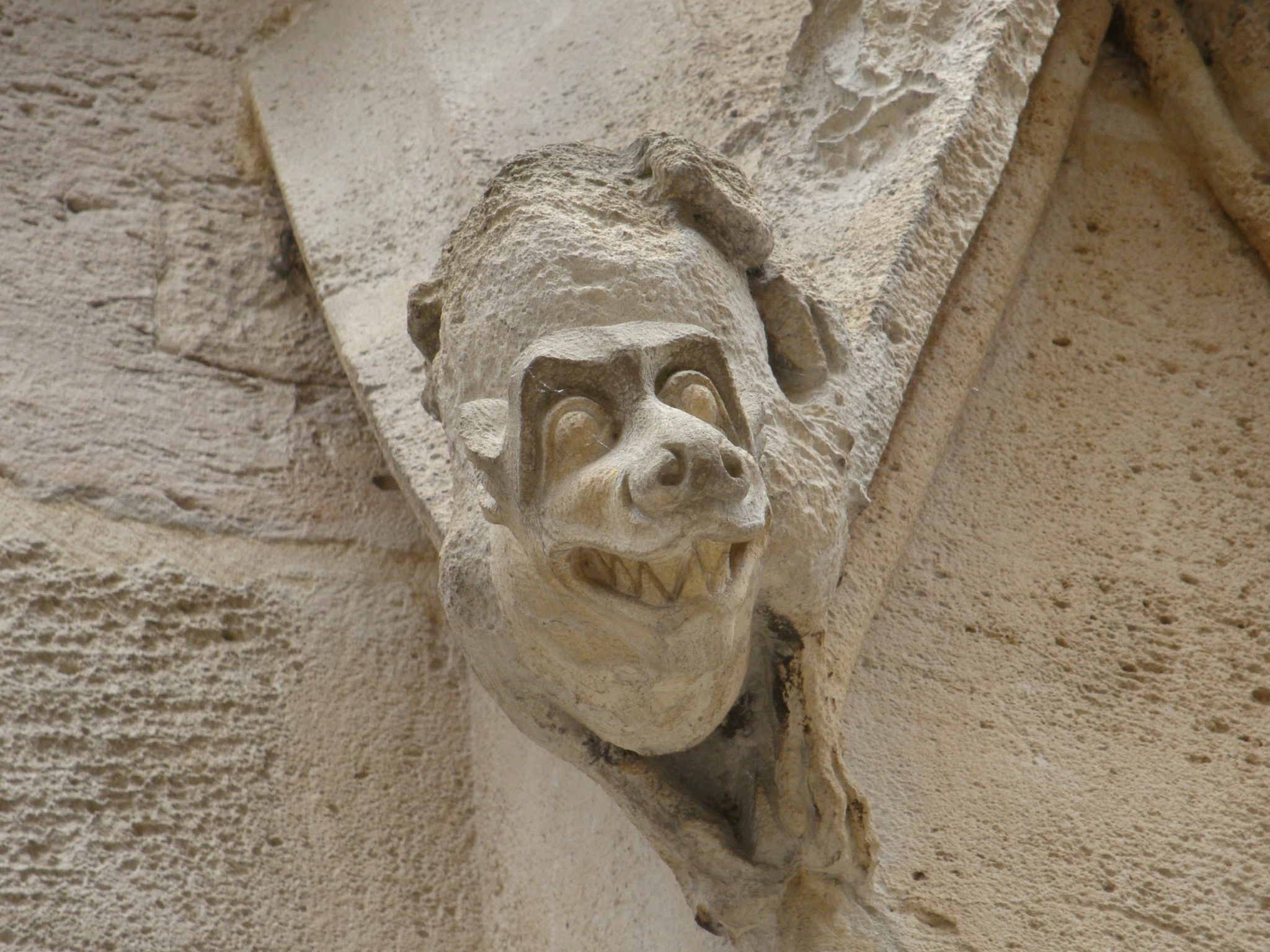
The Smile.

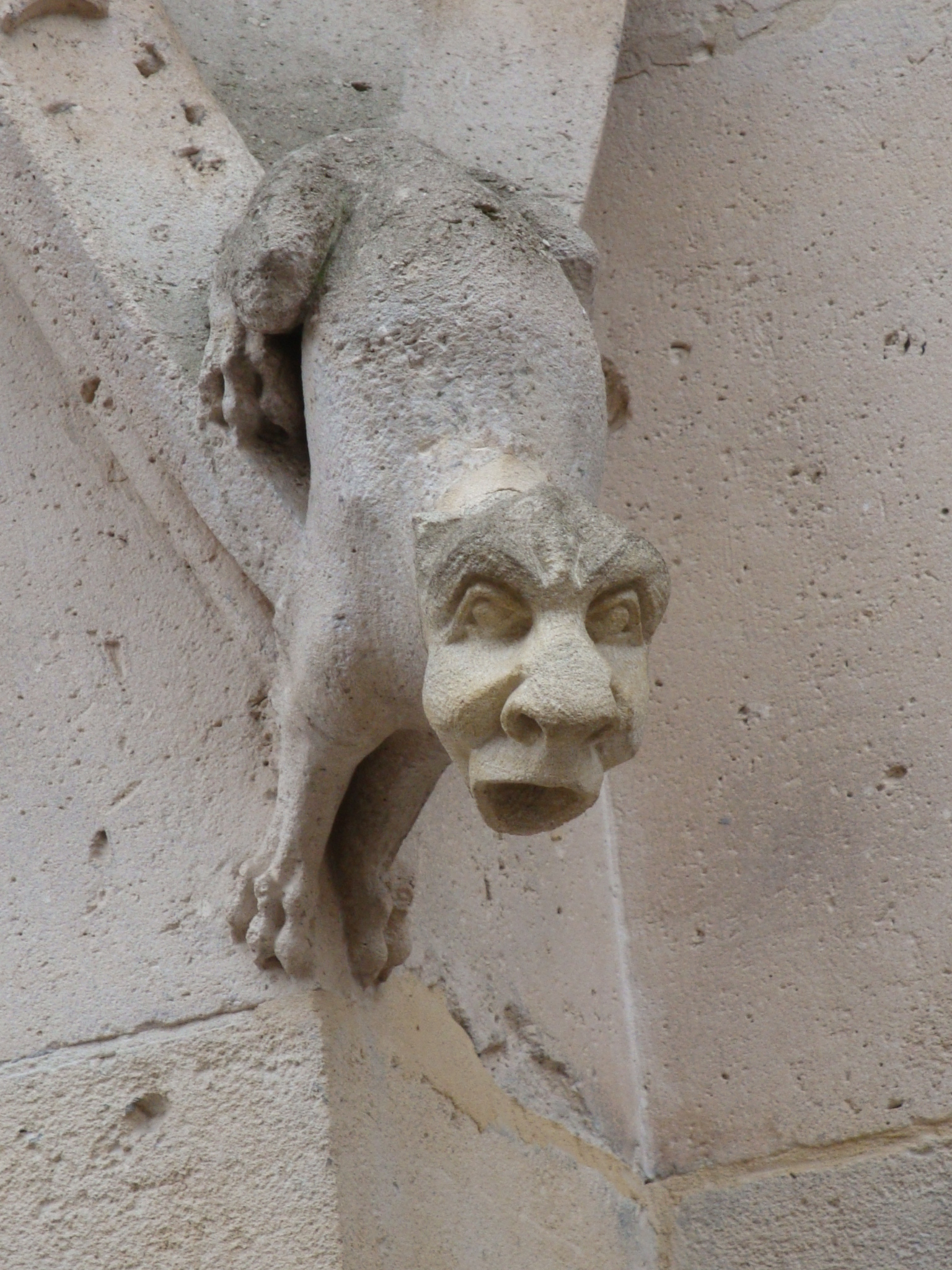
The Yawn.

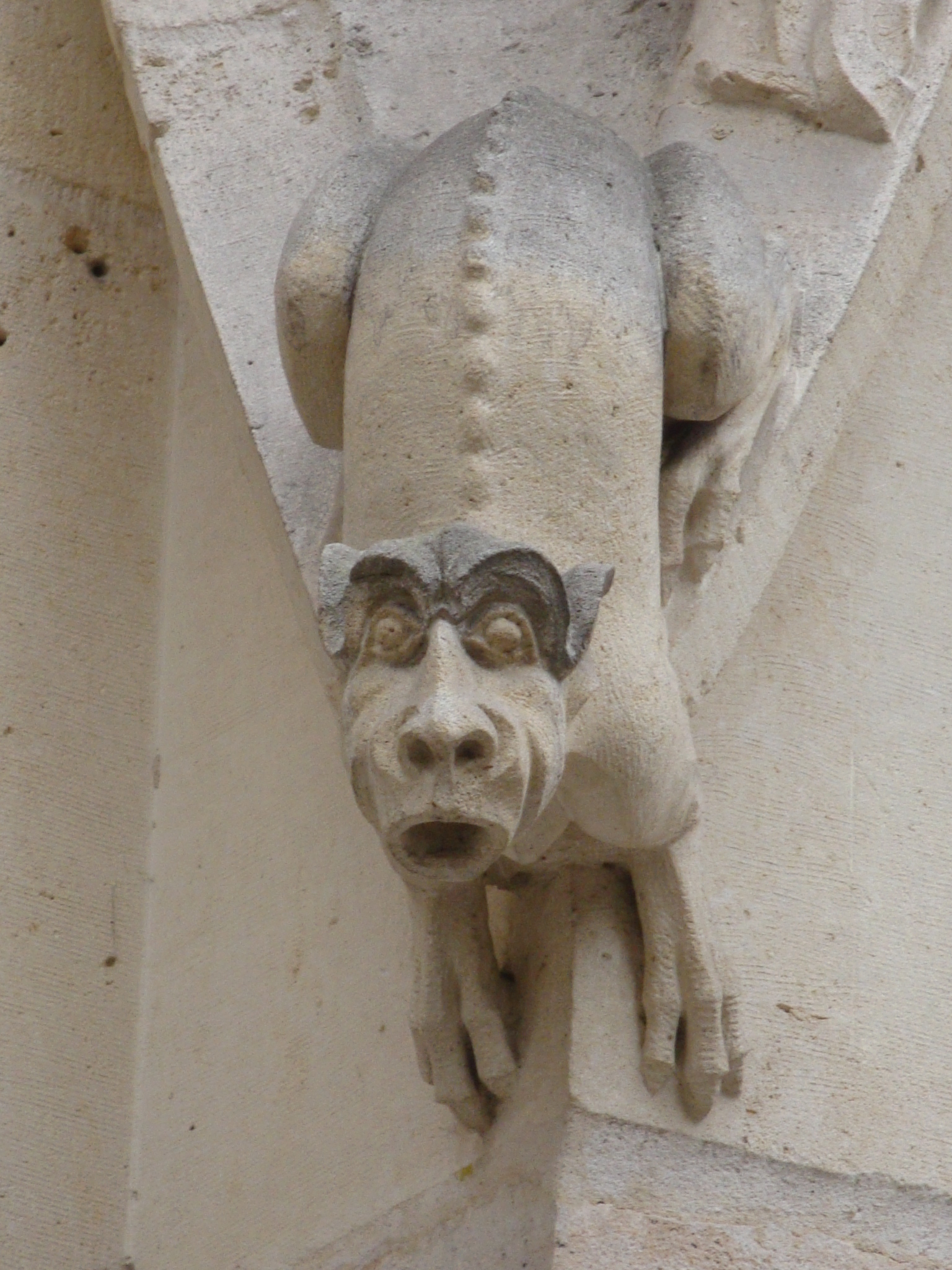
The Surprise.

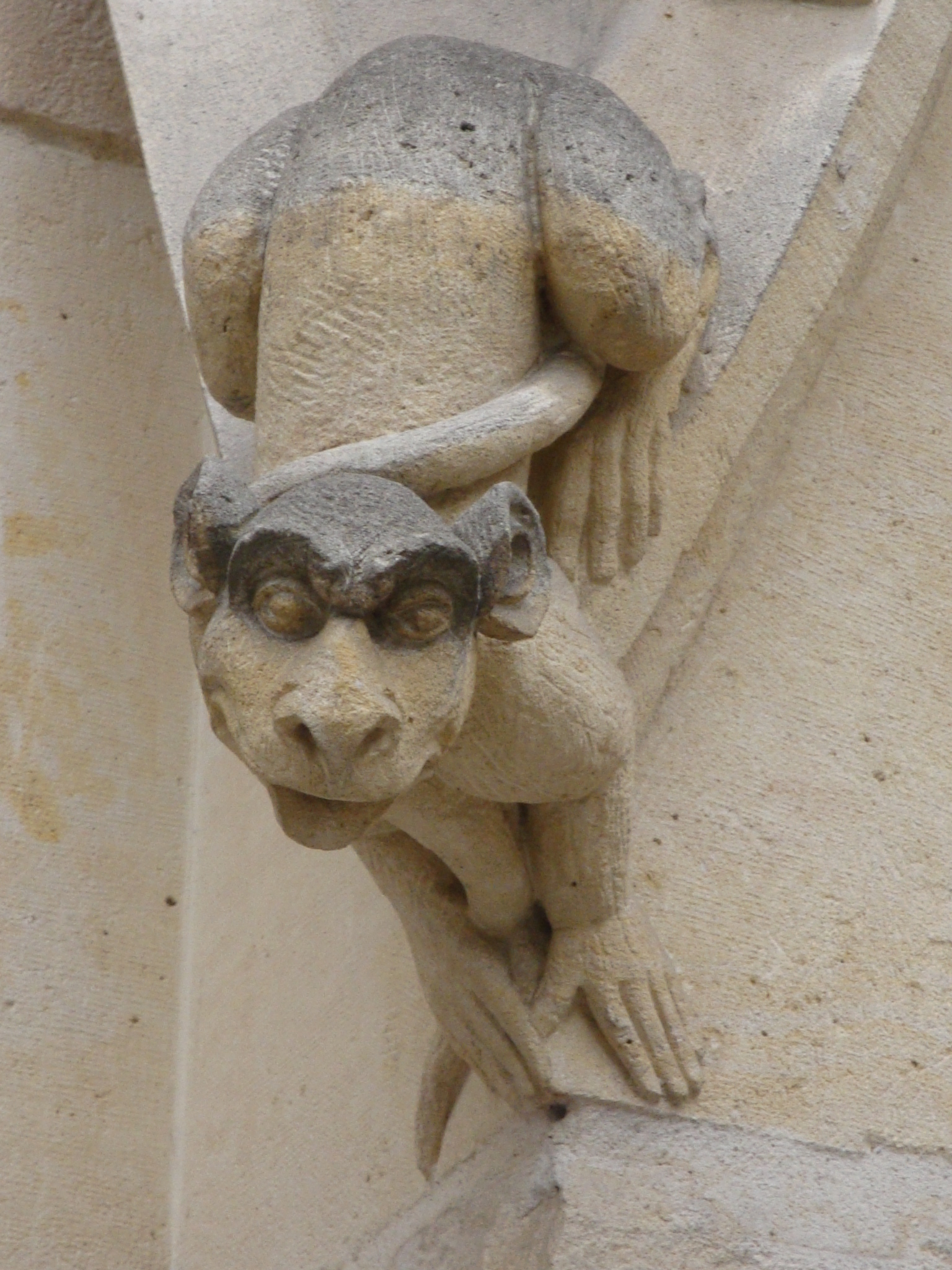
The Imaginary.

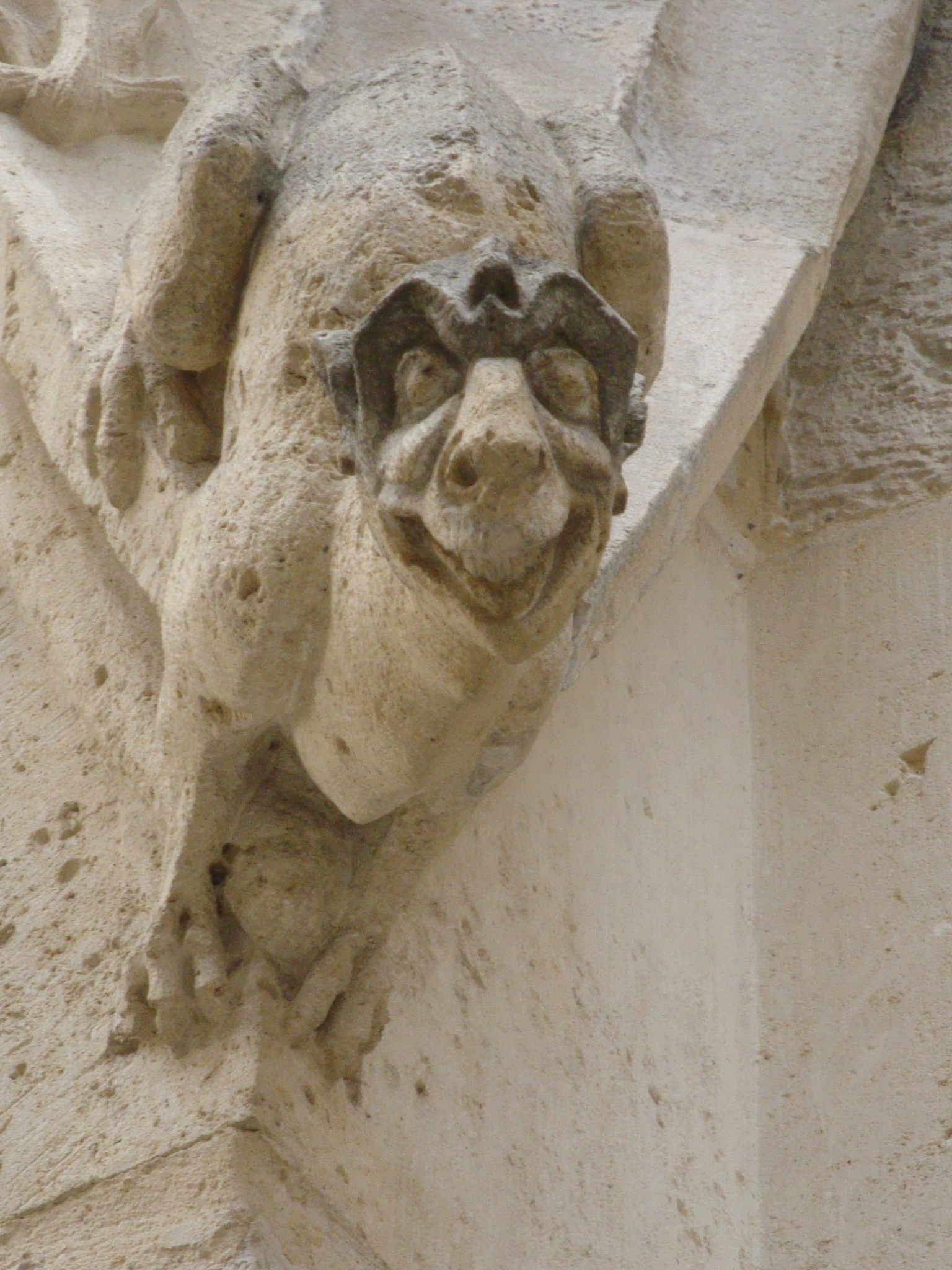
The Laughter.

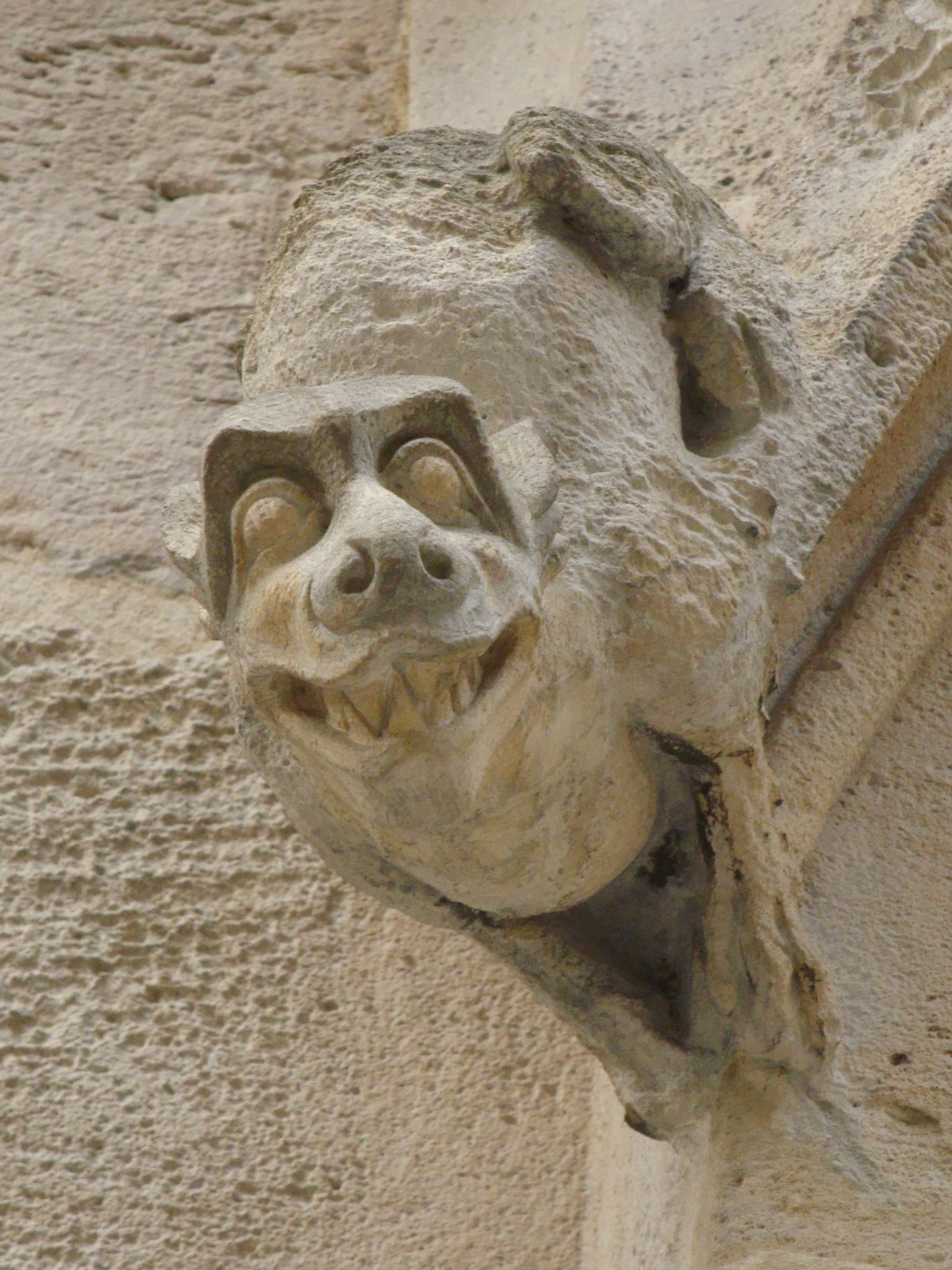
Another Laughter.

In July 2011, Mr. Fabre and Mr. Barbier from the Mainponte workshops resumed work on the bestiary of the Courthouse facades in Rouen, using leftover blocks. These chimeras were crafted from limestone sourced from St. Leu or St. Maximin, commonly found at the Palace of Versailles. The greasy and fine properties of these stones make them ideal for integrating into ancient walls.

=== Views ===
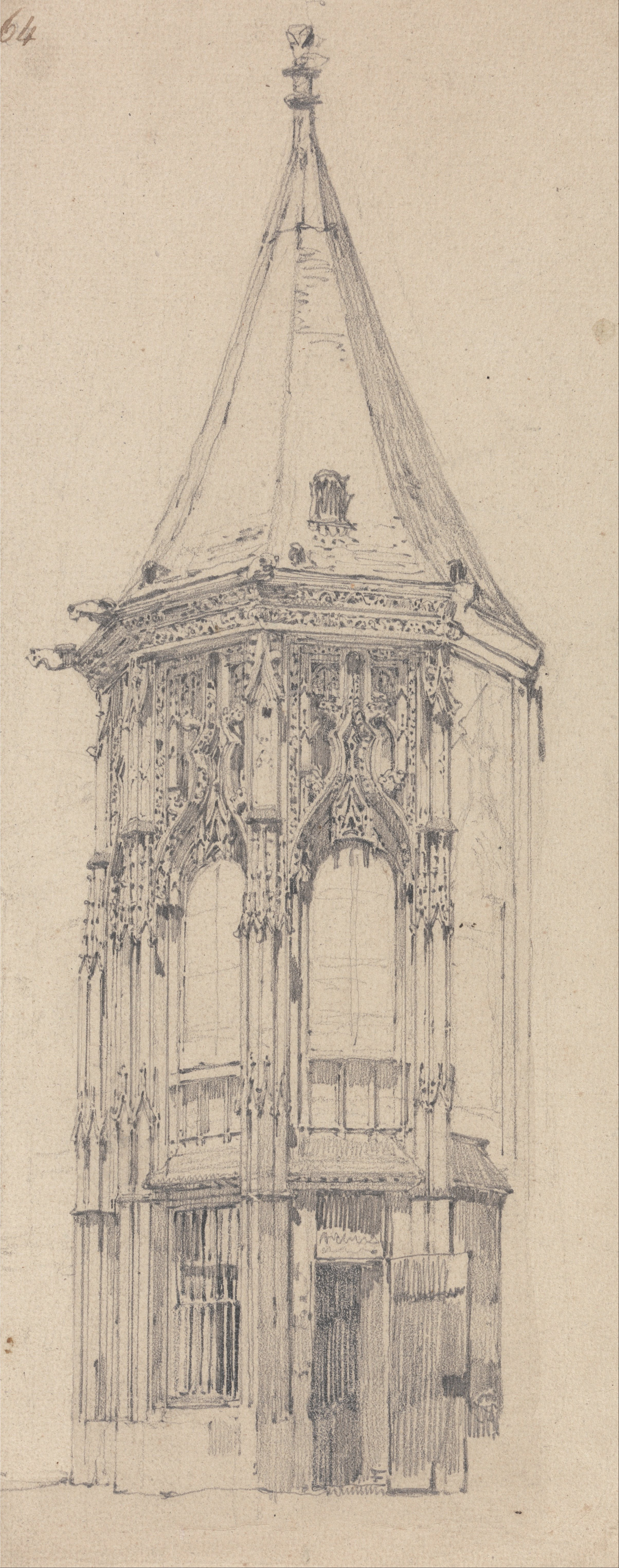
Drawing by Bonington (1824, Yale).

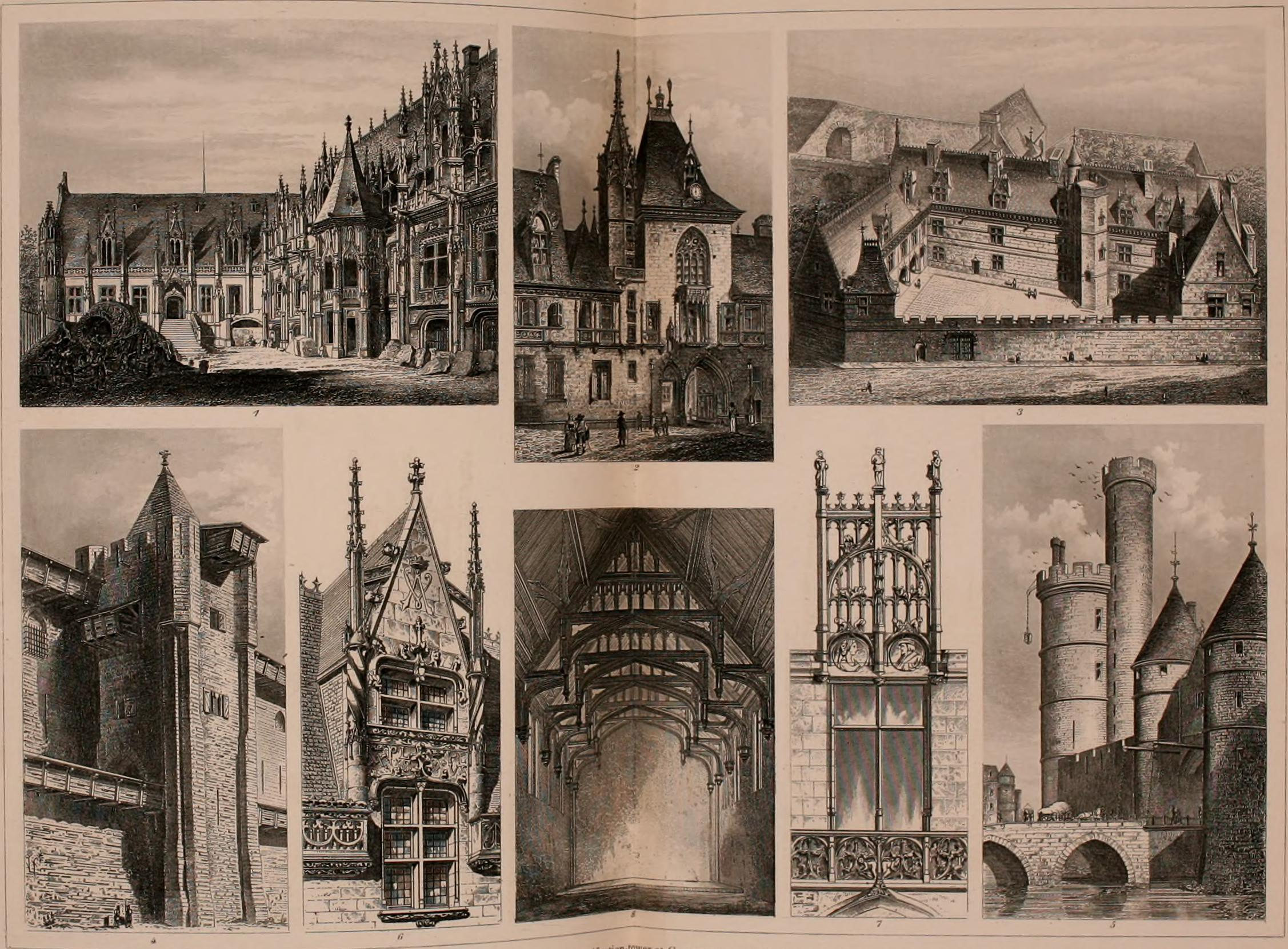
The Rouen Courthouse published in "The Iconographic Encyclopaedia of the Arts and Sciences" (1885).

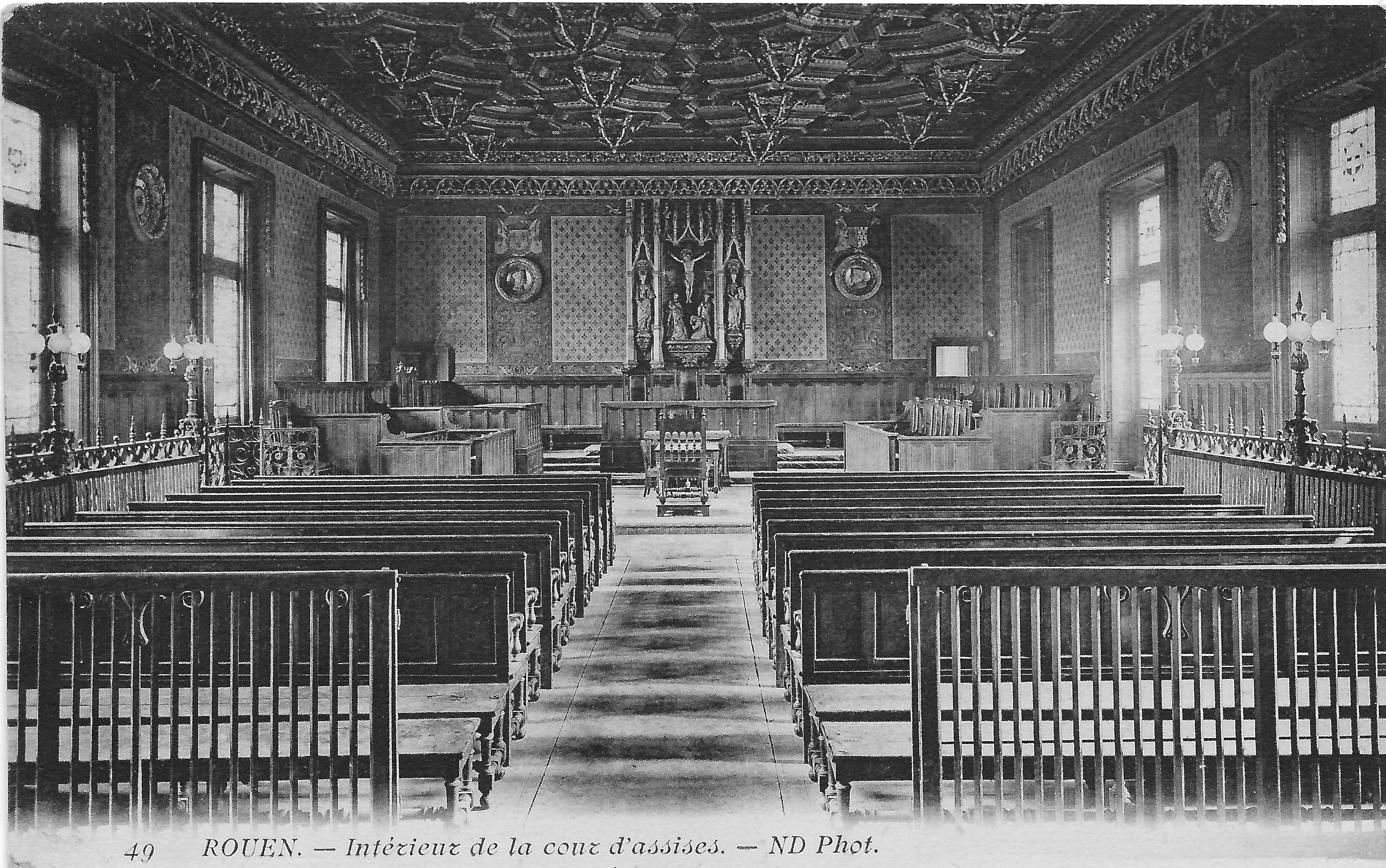
View of the Courtroom (early 19th century).

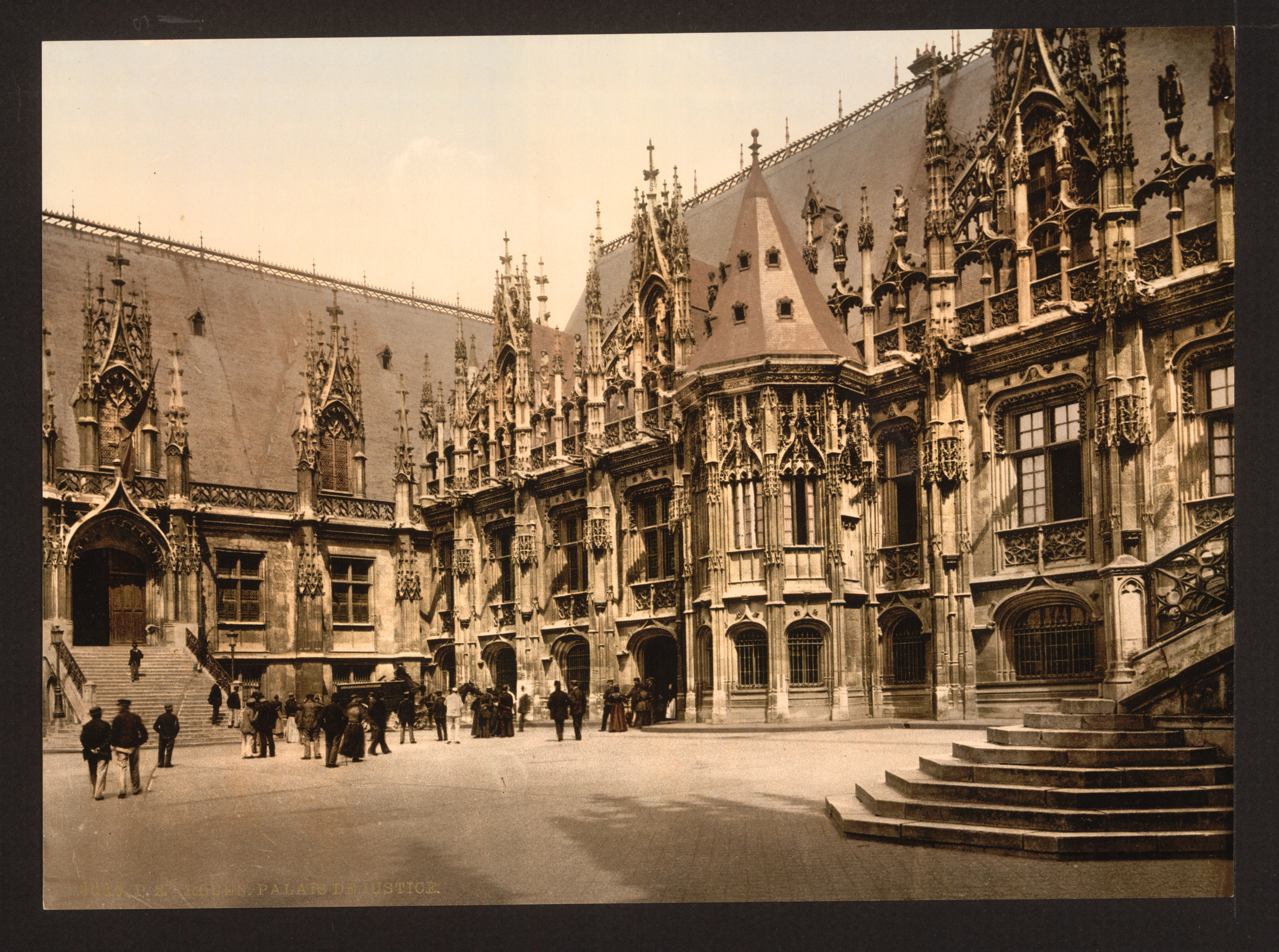
View of the neo-Gothic staircase by Henri Charles Grégoire (between 1890 and 1900).

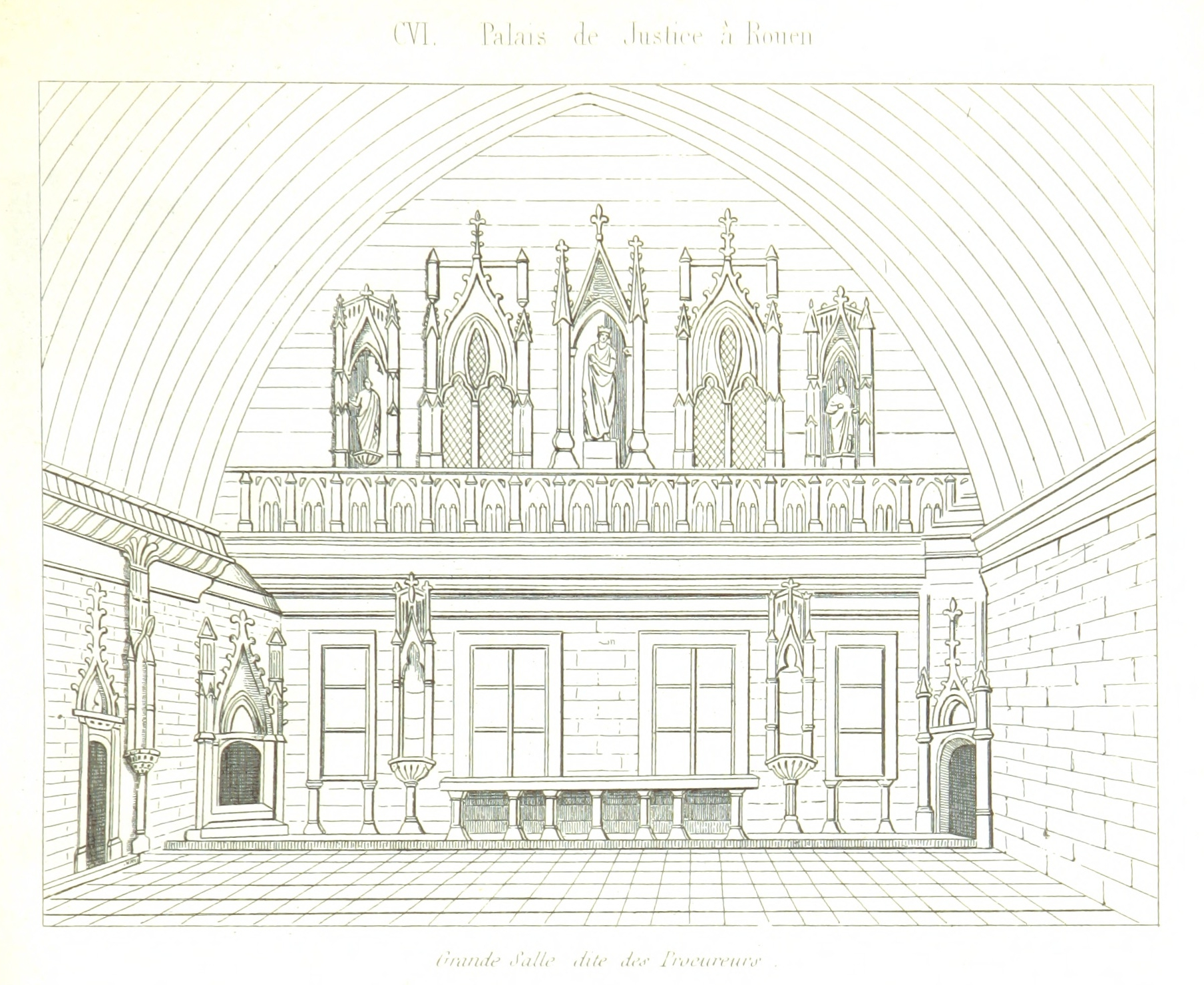
Grand Hall of the Prosecutors; engraving from "Historical and Monumental France" by Jean-Abel Hugo (1836).

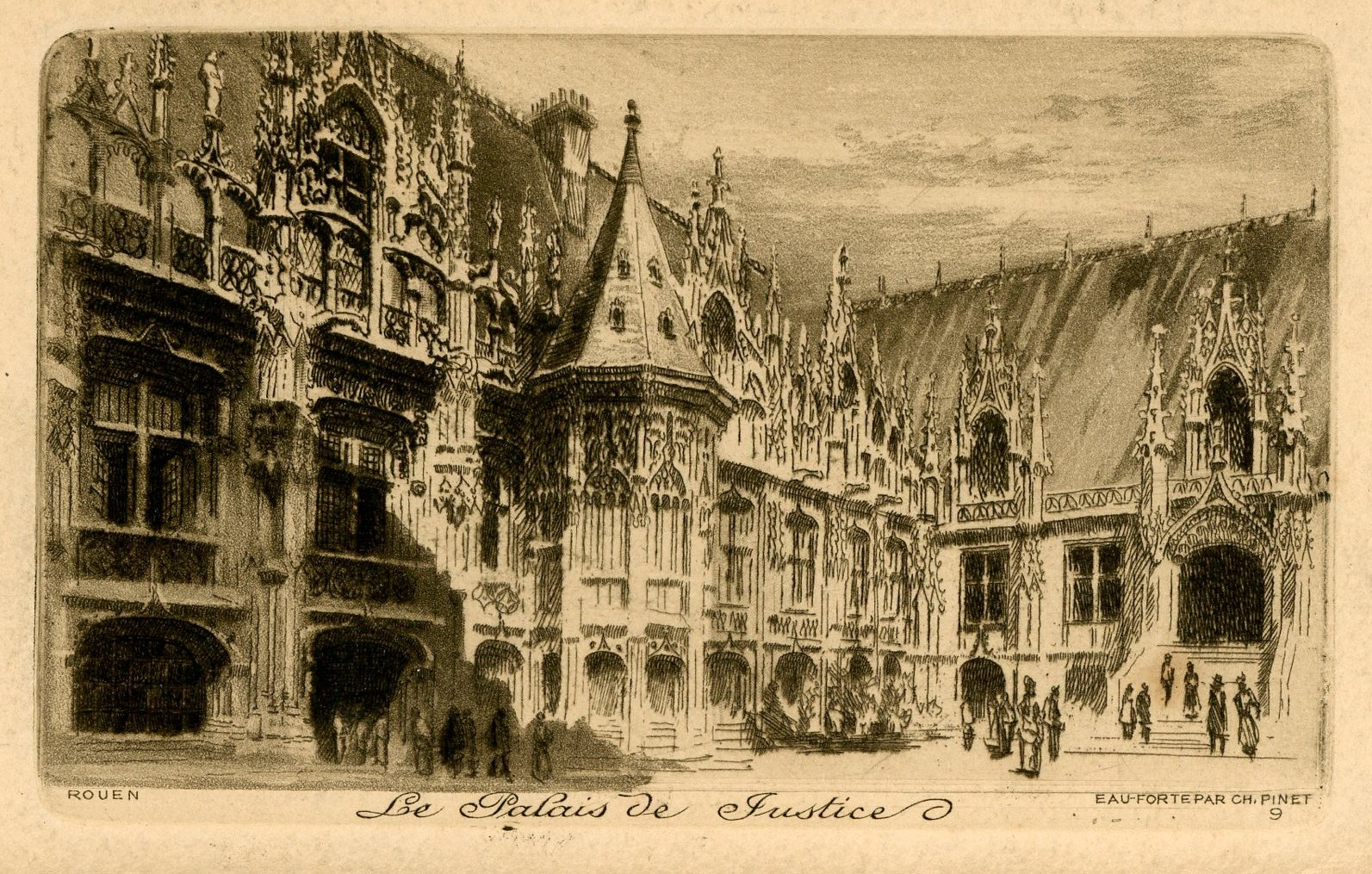
Etching by Charles Pinet (Rouen series no. 9, late 19th century).

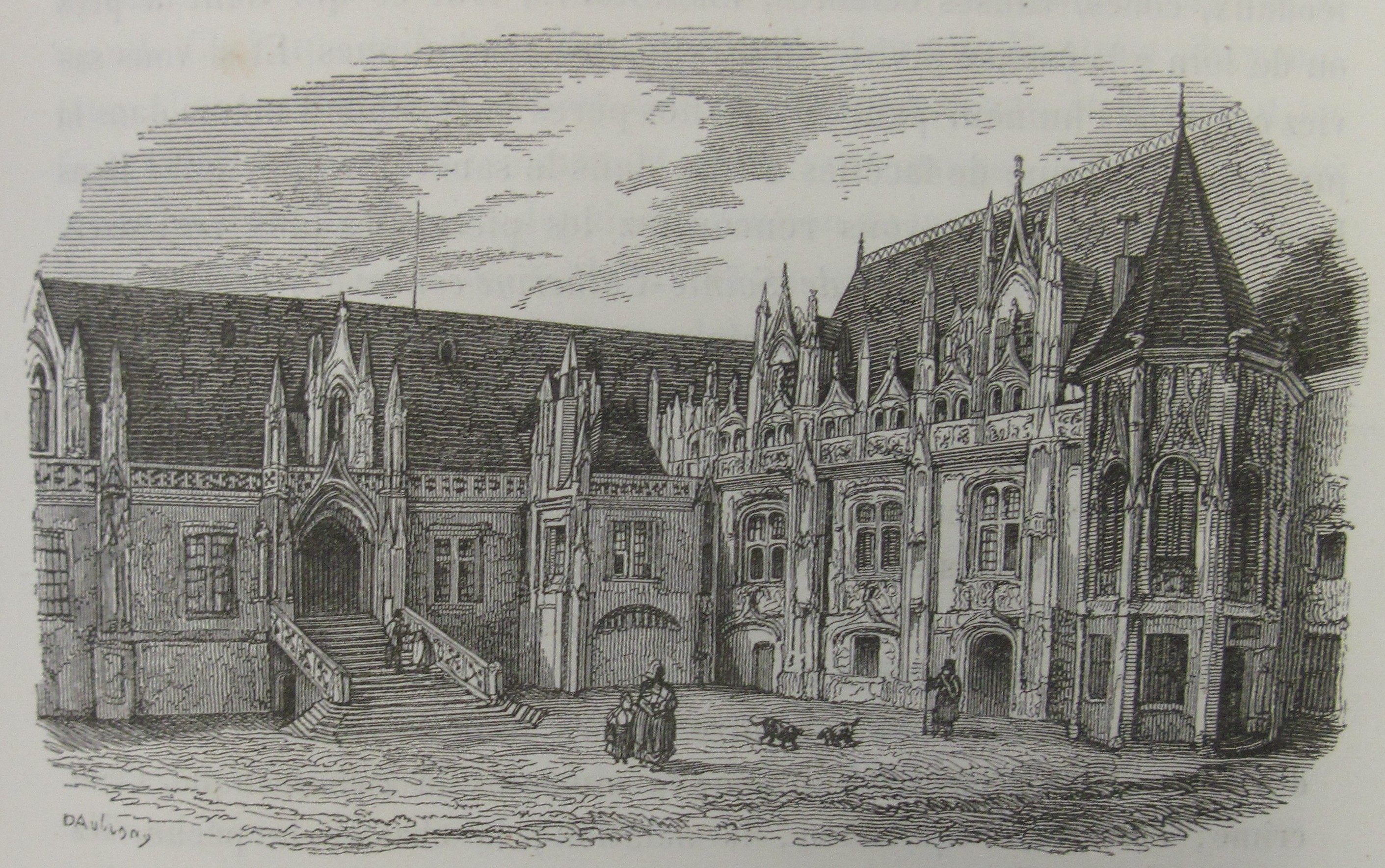
Engraving from La Normandie by Jules Janin (around 1880).

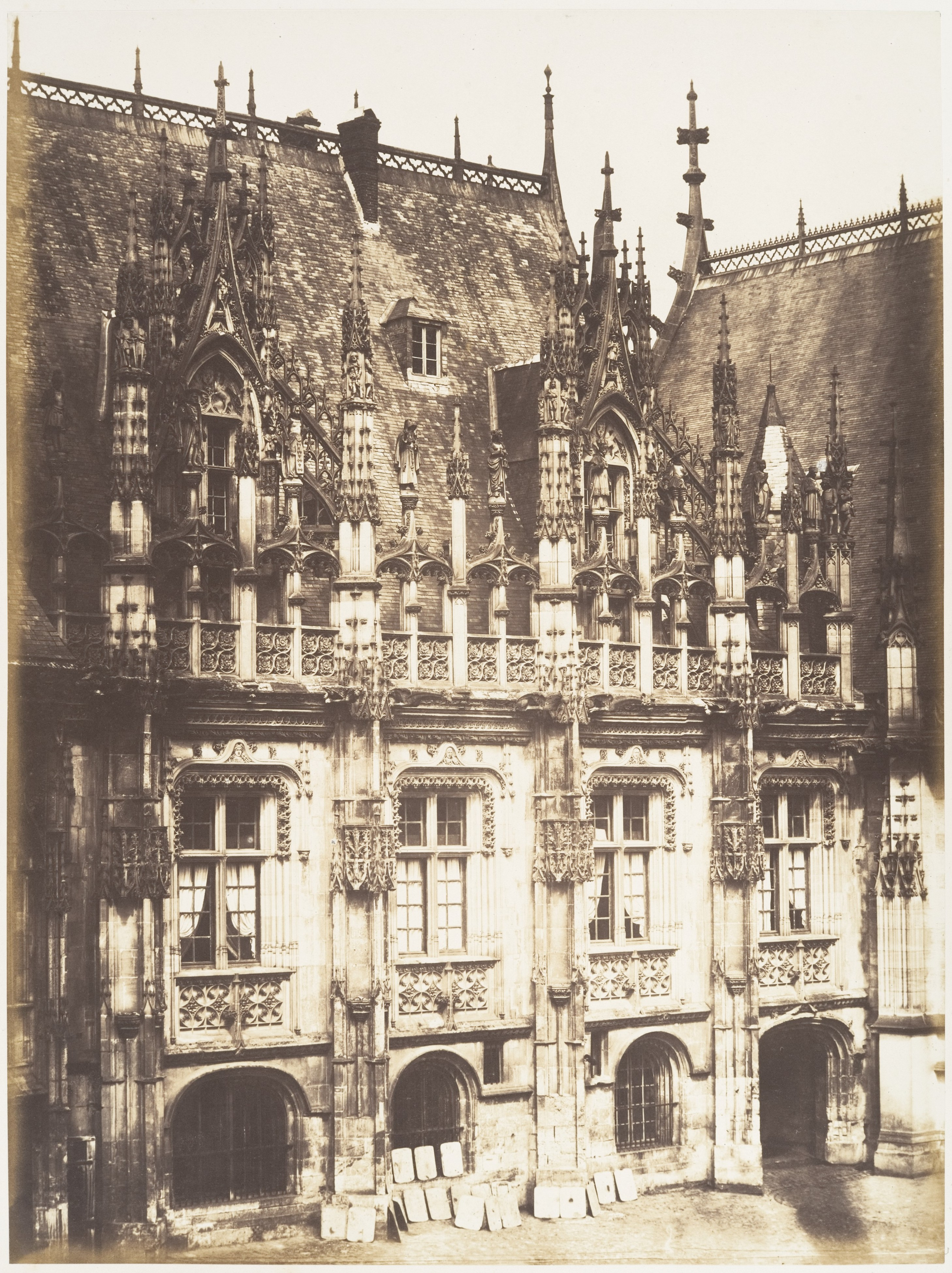
Photograph by Edmond Bacot (1852–54, Metropolitan Museum of Art in New York City).

The engraver Octave de Rochebrune (1824–1900) from Fontenay depicted the facade of the House in the courtyard in one of his large etchings.

== Annexes ==
=== Bibliography ===
- Adeline, Jules (1893). "Le Palais de Justice". La Normandie monumentale et pittoresque (in French). Seine-inférieure: Le Havre. pp. 13–20.
- Plantrou (1999). Du Parlement de Normandie à la Cour d'appel de Rouen 1499–1999 : Ve centenaire du Parlement de Normandie (in French). Rouen: Normandy Parliament Palace Association. ISBN 2-9514177-0-5.
- Spalikowski, Edmond (1939). Le Palais de justice de Rouen et son histoire (in French). Rouen: Maugard.

=== External links ===
- Ressources relatives à l'architecture: Mérimée • Structurae
- Photographies of Rouen Courthouse on Art Days Architecture archive (in French)
- Discover the history and heritage of the Rouen Courthouse archive (in French)
