= Bureau des Finances, Rouen =

Coordinates: 49°26′26″N 1°05′37″E

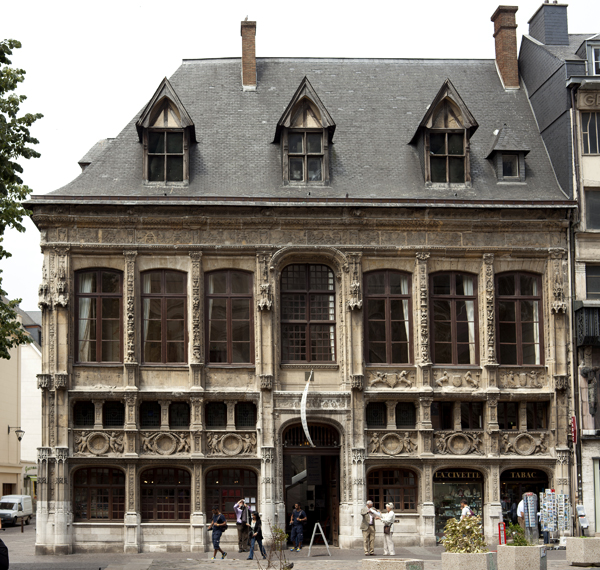

The bureau des Finances is a medieval building on place de la Cathédrale in Rouen. As examples of secular architecture in the Louis XII style of the first decades of the 16th century, its façades and rooves were made monuments historiques in 1926.

Its rich and full conception demonstrate the city's rediscovered prosperity at the end of the 15th century, which allowed the neglected municipal buildings to be renewed. Its style is similar to those of the city's Courthouse and hôtel de Bourgtheroulde, both built at the same time. It was damaged by bombing on 19 April 1944, but the worst damage was in that of 26 August the same year, just before the city's liberation, which destroyed part of its interior decoration.

Formerly a Court of Aids then a bureau des finances, since 1959 it has housed Métropole Rouen Normandie's tourism office at no. 26, whilst no. 27 has housed the "La Civette" tobacconist since at least the 19th century.

== History ==
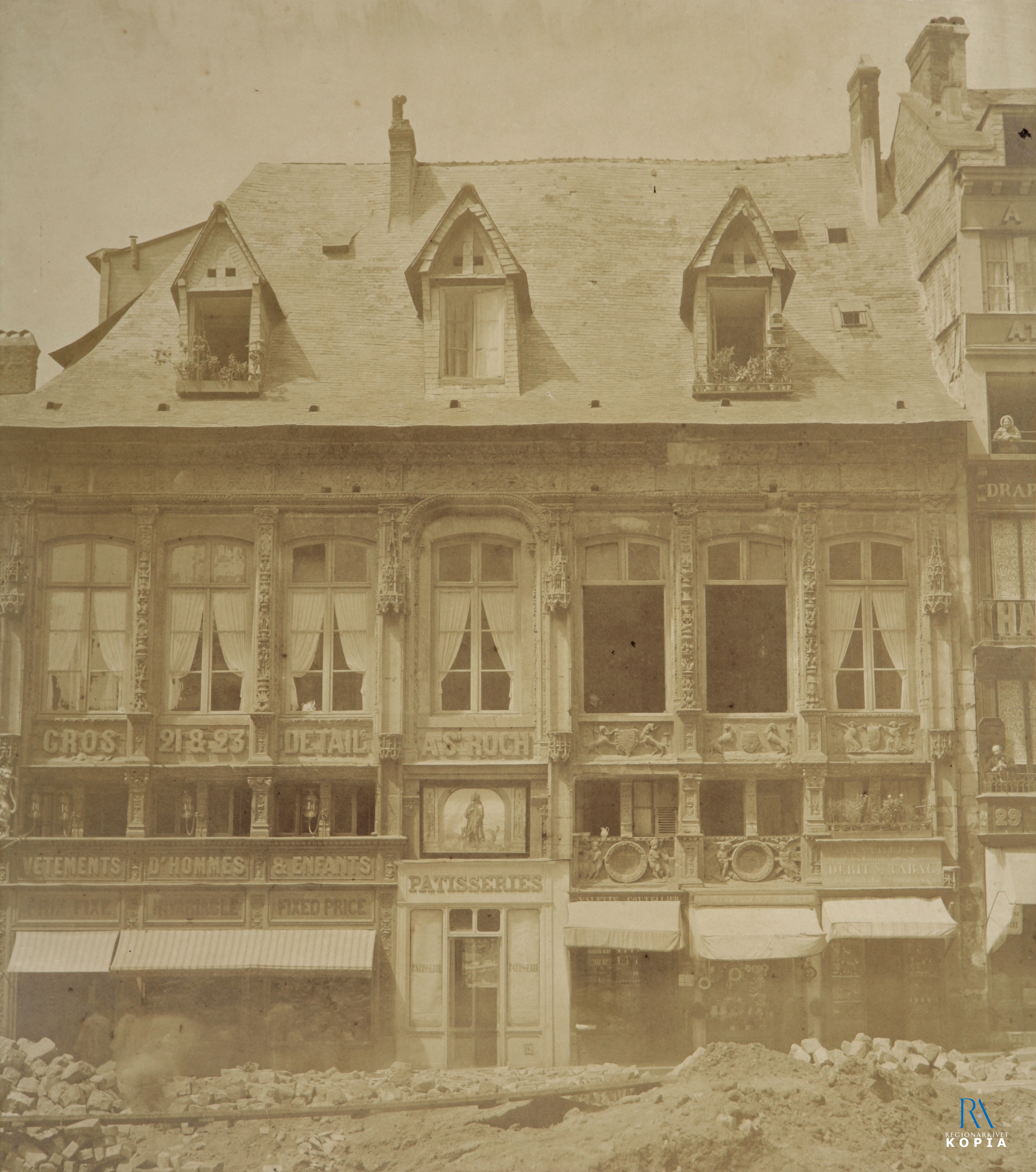
The Bureau des Finances survived the German bombardment during the First World War almost intact (c.1915, former collection of the Swedish architect Victor von Gegerfelt).

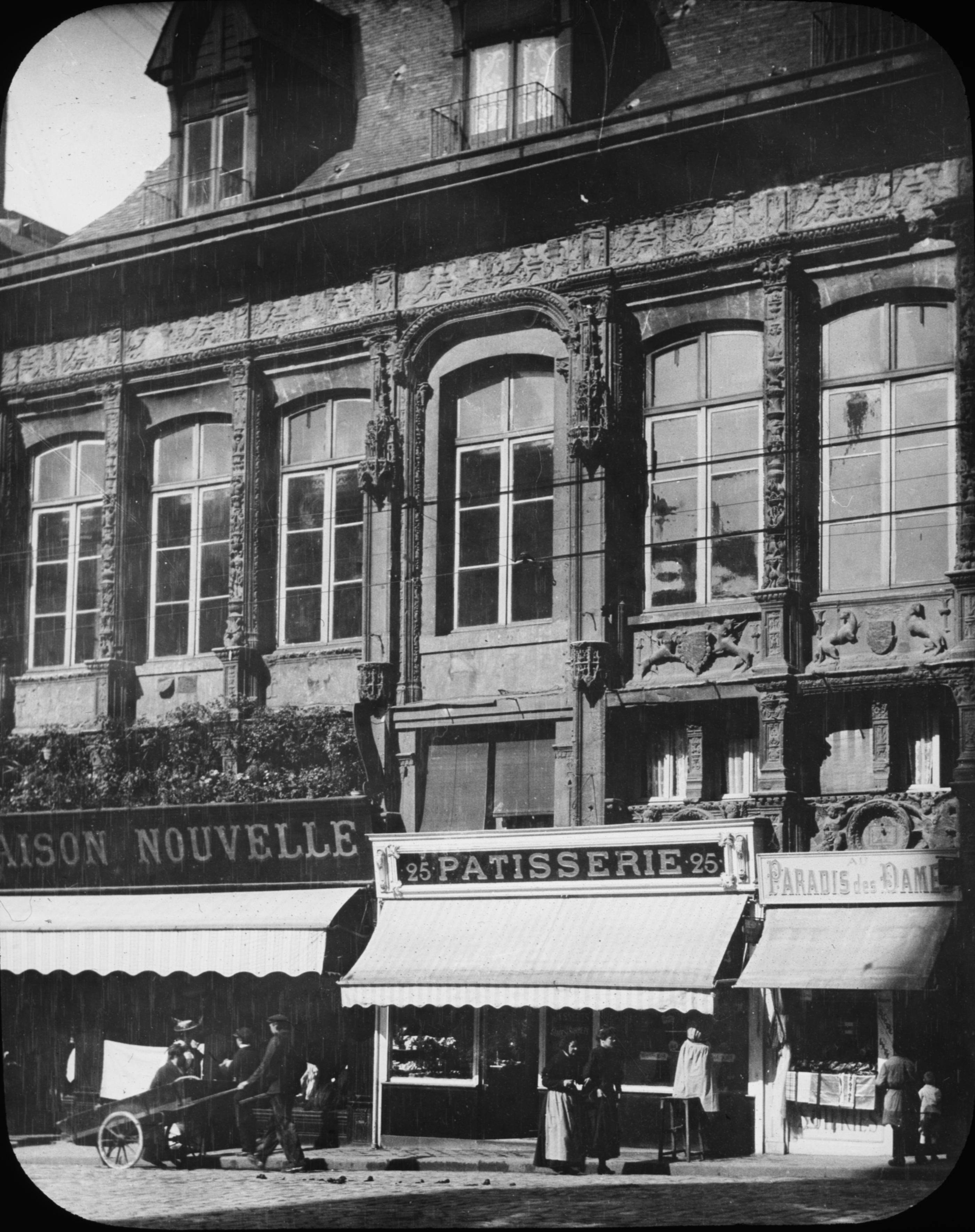
Photograph of the Bureau des Finances in 1908.

=== Context - the development of the Louis XII style in Rouen ===
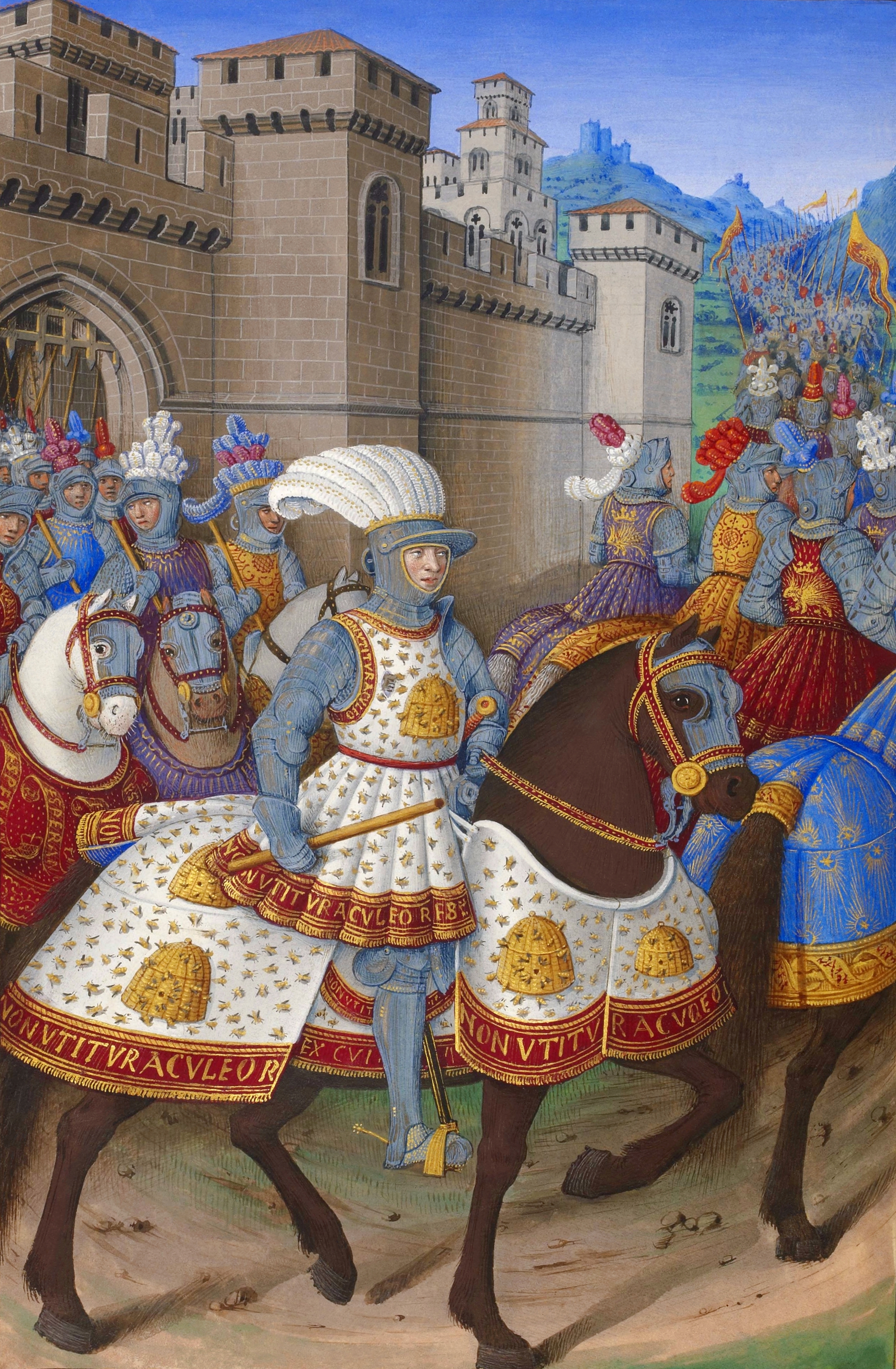
Louis XII and his Troops leaving Alexandria to confront the Genoese by Jean Bourdichon (1508, folio 15v, Bnf).

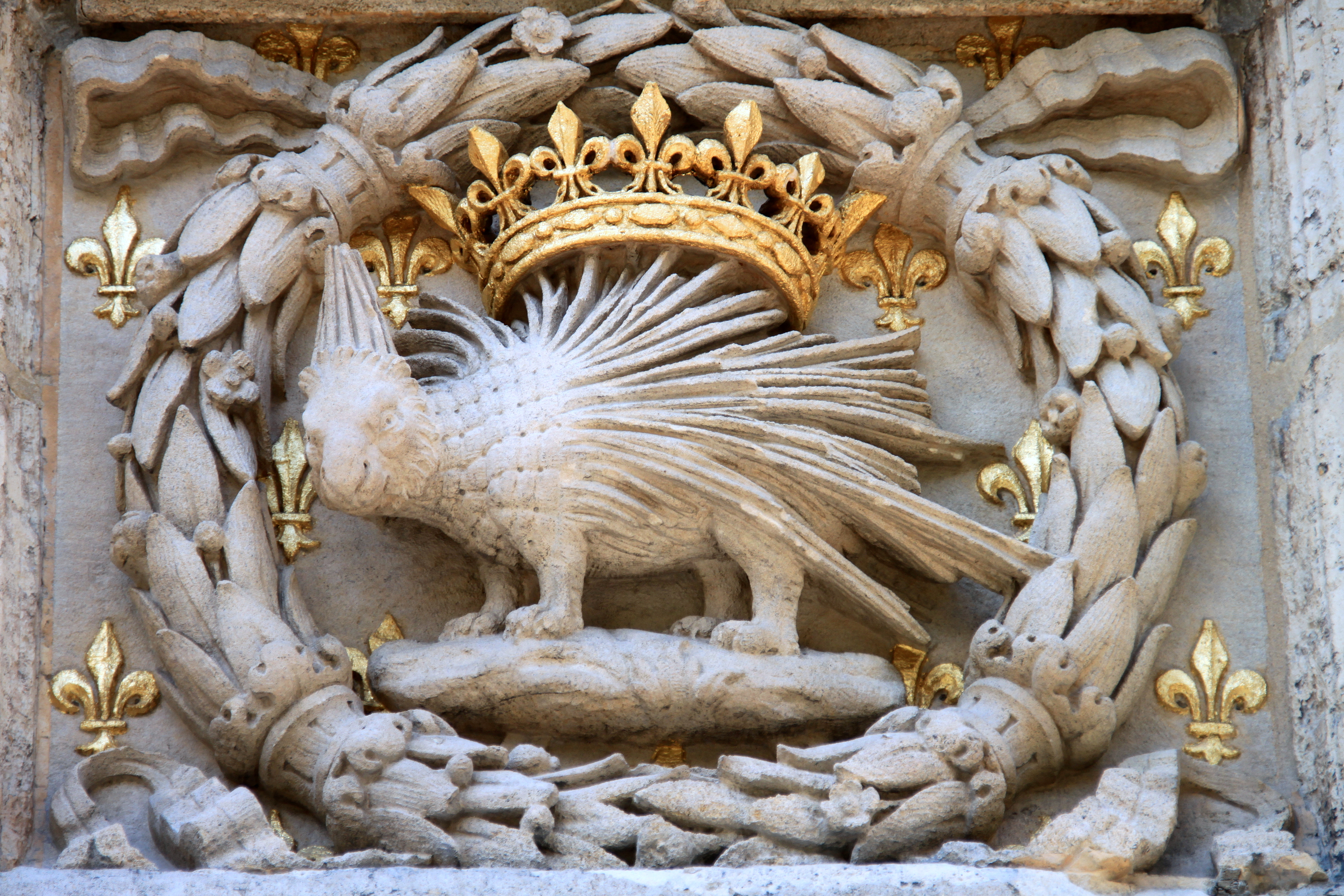
Louis XII's porcupine on the façadeof the hôtel de Bourgtheroulde (c. 1501).

=== Architecture ===
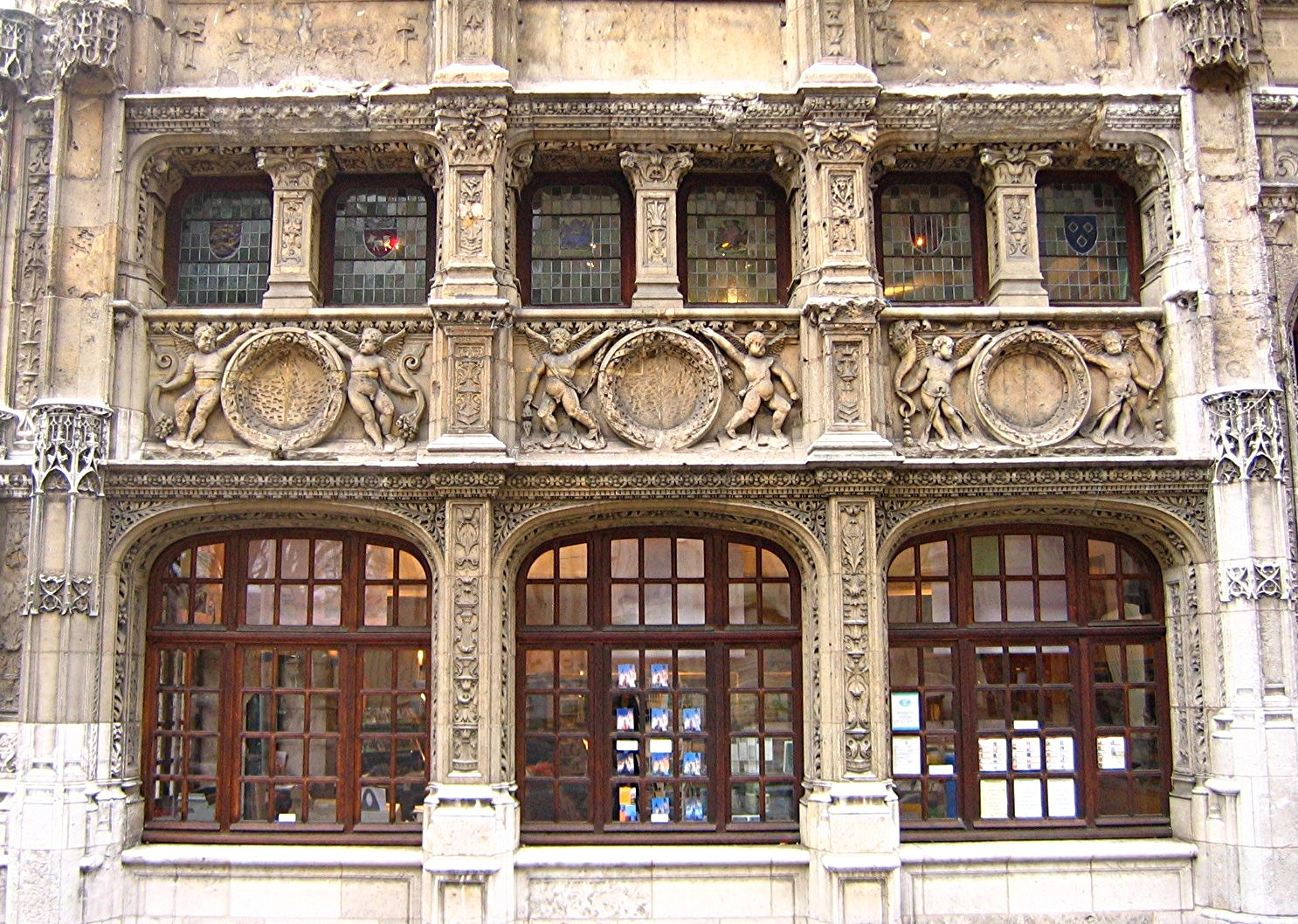
The façade of the Bureau des finances (1509) remains a belated manifestation of the Louis XII style.

It has two façades - one on the forecourt of Rouen Cathedral and the other, lesser-known one on rue du Petit-Salut. They were designed and built by the master builder Rolland le Roux.

Marking a new stage in the style compared to the Rouen Courthouse and the hôtel de Bourgtheroulde, it shows the transition between Gothic architecture and France's First Renaissance. The two façades are typical of the last phase of the Louis XII style, showing Louis XII's porcupine and Francis I's salamander.

As in the Louis XII wing of the château de Blois (contemporary with the Bureau), the broken ogive arch was replaced by the basket handle arch whilst windows were enlarged (as seen slightly earlier in the Courthouse) conveys a notion of luxury, whose abundance contributes to teh enchanting atmosphere of the building. As early as the end of the 14th century, the almost magical properties of the largely open palace were already apparent when Guillebert de Mets described the sumptuous Paris residence of Jacques Ducy, then a clerk in the Chambre des Comptes. Besides letting in light, these enlarged opening allowed the rooms to be better ventilated, reflecting a new concern for hygiene, whilst - under Italian Renaissance influence - it also included high windows linked by mouldings to make the facades' rhythm more regular, · thus foreshadowing the grid pattern of exteriors in the Early Renaissance.

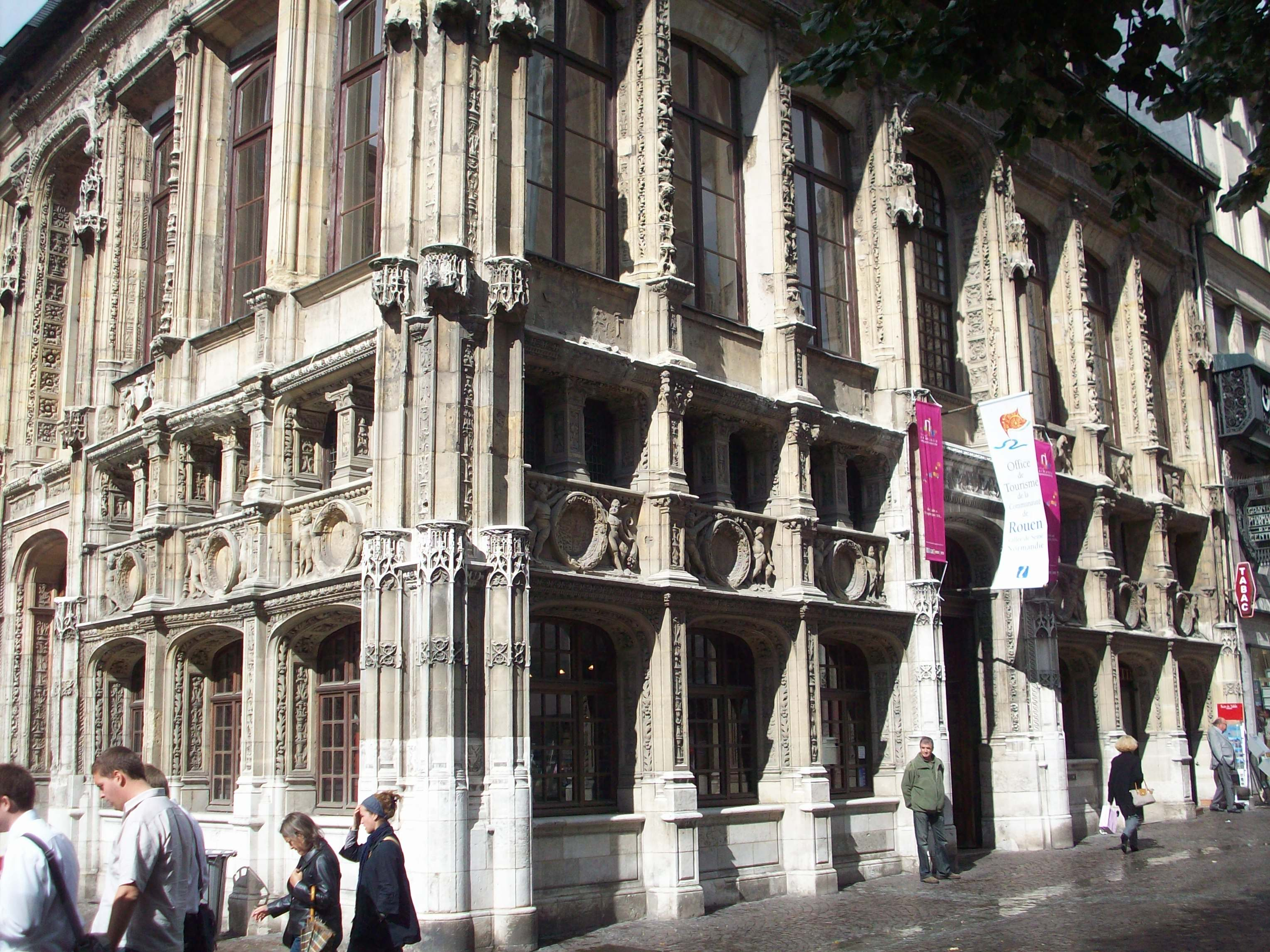
While no attempt was ever made to reproduce Italian buildings, as the Louis XII style developed it gradually imposed Early Renaissance forms, progressively diluting Gothic art and forms with Italian decorum..

== Bibliography (in French) ==
- Léon Palustre (editor), L'architecture de la Renaissance, Paris, 7 rue Saint-Benoît, ancienne maison Quentin, Libraires-Imprimerie réunies, 1892 ISBN 9781508701187
- Jules Adeline, Le Bureau des Finances, in La Normandie monumentale et pittoresque, Seine-Inférieure, Le Havre, Lemale et Cie, imprimeurs, éditeurs, 1893, p. 21-24.
- Robert Ducher (photographs by Pierre Devinoy), Caractéristiques des styles, Paris, Flammarion Éditeur, 1963, 410 pages ISBN 9782080113597
- Paul Rouaix, Histoire des beaux arts Moyen Âge renaissance, Paris, Librairie Renouard, Henri Laurens, 1906, 194 pages
- Eugène Viollet-le-Duc, Dictionnaire raisonné de l’architecture française du XI au XVI siecles, vol. 1, Paris, rue Mignon, Imprimerie de E. Martinet, 1854-1868 ISBN 9783849135973
- Actes du premier colloque international de l'association verre et histoire Paris-La Défense/ Versailles, 13-15 octobre 2005. Intervention de Sophie Lagabrielle, conservateur en chef, Musée du Moyen Âge, Paris.
- Jean-Pierre Babelon, Châteaux de France au siècle de la Renaissance, Paris, Flammarion / Picard, 1989/1991, 840 pages, ISBN 978-2080120625

== External links (in French) ==
- Rouen Normandie Tourisme & Congrès
