= Viane =

Viane may refer to:

- Denis Viane (born 1977), Belgian footballer
- Gray Viane (born 1982), New Zealand rugby league player
- Viane, Belgium, a village in Belgium
- Viane, Tarn, French commune
