= Callebaut (disambiguation) =

Callebaut may refer to:

== Companies ==
- Barry Callebaut, cocoa producer
  - Callebaut, Belgian chocolate brand, subsidiary of Barry Callebaut

== People ==
- Anna Callebaut, Belgian racing cyclist
- Doris Callebaut, Indonesian actress
- Jan Callebaut, Belgian market researcher
- Jelita Callebaut, Indonesian actress, daughter of Doris Callebaut
- Marijke Callebaut, Belgian football player
- Troely Callebaut, Indonesian actress
- Vincent Callebaut, Belgian architect
- Werner Callebaut, Belgian philosopher of science
