= Krakelingen and Tonnekensbrand =

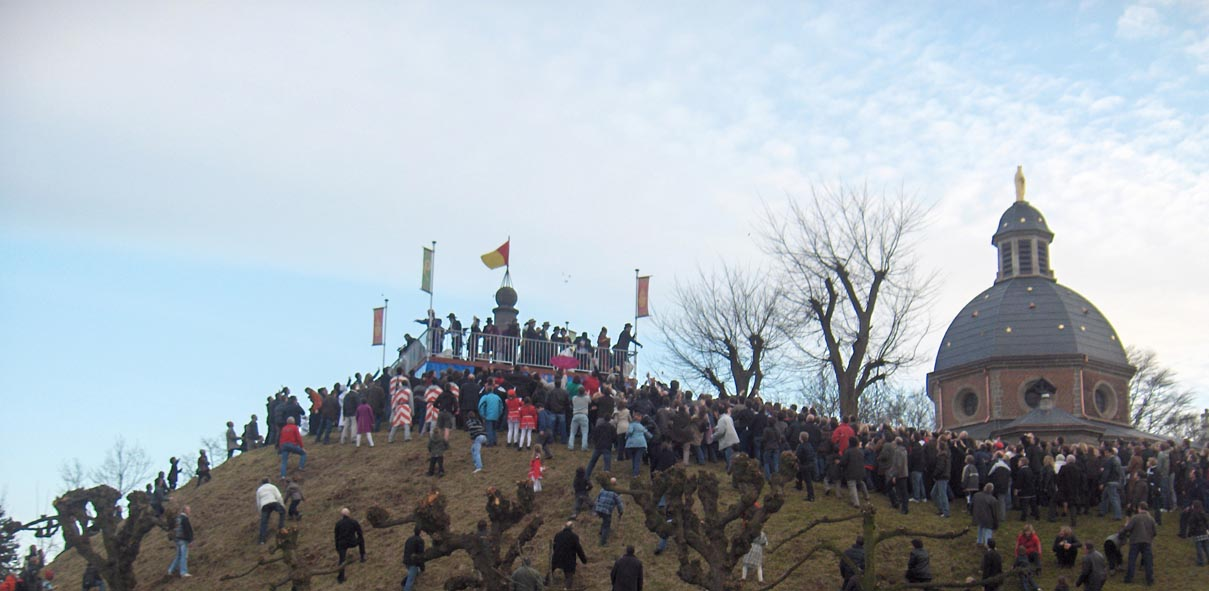
- Krakelingenworp
- Date: Last Sunday of February
- Frequency: Annual
- Locations: Geraardsbergen, Belgium
- Inaugurated: 1393

Krakelingen and Tonnekensbrand, end-of-winter bread and fire feast at Geraardsbergen
- UNESCO Intangible Cultural Heritage
- Country: Belgium
- Reference: 00401
- Region: Europe and North America

Inscription history
- Inscription: 2010 (5th session)
- List: Representative

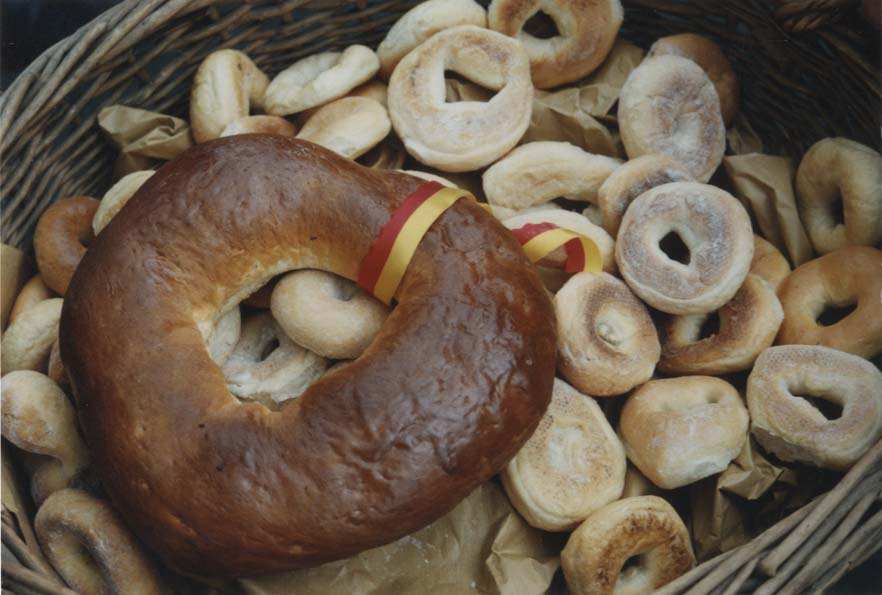
Geraardsbergen kringles or "mastellen"

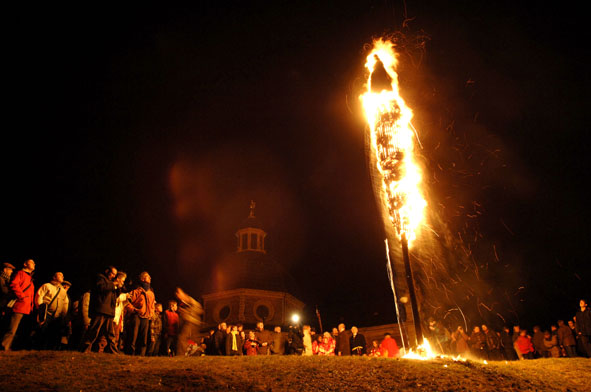
Tonnekensbrand

Krakelingen and Tonnekensbrand are the names of annual centuries-old festivities in Geraardsbergen. The summit of the event is the Krakelingenworp at the top of the Oudenberg hill. At the same day and place the Tonnekensbrand has place in the evening. The double festivity was inscribed in the Inventory of Immaterial Cultural Heritage of Flanders in 2009, and UNESCO's lists of Intangible Cultural Heritage in 2010.

The oldest saved city account of Geraardsbergen, of 1393, already lists the costs for the Tonnekensbrand. At that time this fire festival was already organised by the city council. Still in the city account, this firefeast was already called a centuries-old custom. Since that time there is continuous evidence of both Tonnekensbrand and Krakelingen in the town accounts of Geraardsbergen. This double feast still contains pre-Christian elements that may originate from the Celtic period such as fire, live fish, bread and the time of the party. The Tonnekensbrand belongs home in a broader tradition of pre-Christian firefalls and symbolizes the end of winter and the return of light and life. In addition, there are also Christian elements, such as the role of the pastor-dean.

The kringle (Dutch: "krakeling") that is thrown, also called mastel in Geraardsbergen, is a ring-shaped sandwich of about 10 centimetres (3.9 in) diameter. The shape refers to a cult bread and symbolises the cycle of seasons or life. The party is celebrated at the end of winter, usually on the last Sunday of February.

== Historical parade ==
Before the actual kringle throw on the Oudenberg, a historic procession starts in the city center, which gives a colourful picture of about 25 centuries of history of Geraardsbergen. The pastor-dean and the city council are dressed in historical clothing. The approximately 1000 extras are largely local volunteers who, whether or not in a school or association, make an annual effort to portray the historical procession. In here, historical facts (Celtic elements and the defeat of Geraardsbergen against the army of the count of Flanders led by Walter of Enghien) enter into a dialogue with the saga formation around the origin of the parties. This creates a broad reflection on their own cultural heritage. To promote this awareness among the population, each year, in addition to the substantial core of history, an aspect of the historical-folk heritage is specially highlighted. In recent years these have included the contacts of Geraardsbergen with Latin America (the mission work of Pedro de Gante, the move to Vera Paz in the 20th century), the role of women in the construction of the city, local medieval crafts and 19th-century industries (organ builders, lace, cigars), regional artists with international fame, the folk and cultural-historical input of the boroughs in the merger. The procession starts at 3 pm at the old Romanesque church of Hunnegem and ends at the Oudenberg.

== Krakelingenworp (Kringle Throw, popular name: "Mastellenworp") ==
At the end of the procession, the druids, the dean, the city council, the bread basket carriers and thousands of spectators go to the top of the Oudenberg (110 m). The dean (the spiritual government), together with the city administration (the worldly government), prays the litany of Our Lady in the Oudenberg Chapel while the crowd takes place around the stage to catch as many kringles as possible. Before they are allowed to throw the 10,000 or so kringles ("mastellen"), the dean, the mayor, the aldermen and the town councilors from a 400-year-old silver coupe have to drink a sip of wine with a live fish. Then the actual kringle throw starts. One sandwich contains a note that entitles you to the golden kringle: a unique jewel in the form of the famous sandwich, always designed by a different local jeweler. After the throw, everyone can catch their breath for a few hours on the fair in the city center.

== Tonnekensbrand, a fire feast ==
At 8 pm a straw doll is lit on top of the Oudenberg to chase away the winter and welcome the new spring while folk dancers create the atmosphere. In a few neighboring municipalities, the Tonnekens fire is "answered" with a smaller fire. On the Oudenberg, burning torches are handed out to the bystanders and they bring the fire to the Markt, where the fairground mills are running at full speed.

== Symbolics ==
The double festival contains both Christian (for example, the role of the dean) and pre-Christian elements (fire, live fish, bread, time). The pre-Christian dates probably from the Celtic period. The kringle is a ring-shaped roll of 10 centimetres (3.9 in) diameter. This form refers to a cult bread that symbolizes the cycle of the seasons or of life. The festival is also celebrated at the end of the winter: until 1960 the first Sunday of Lent, now the second to last Sunday before the first Monday of March. The Tonnekensbrand belongs to a broader tradition of pre-Christian fire festivals and symbolizes the end of winter, the return of light and life. The dean, the mayor, the aldermen and the municipal councilors each drink a small living fish, also a symbol of new life, in a bowl of wine, a sign of celebration and fraternity. The latter custom, described in detail by humanist Joos Schollaert in 1599, was indicted by the animal rights organization Gaia in 1997, but the city council was upheld by the various judicial authorities.

== Saga ==
Since the beginning of the 19th century, mention has been made of a historical saga about the origin of the Krakelingen festivity. When Geraardsbergen was surrounded by the troops of Walter van Edingen in 1381 and threatened with starvation, the city authorities would have come up with a ruse to escape the occupation: the last remains of bread and herring were thrown over the city wall as a "sign" of abundance and the besiegers drifted discouraged ... In the historical procession, this saga is tested against the historical reality, which was much less beautiful for Geraardsbergen: the city was captured and destroyed in no time. However, the legend continues to live stubbornly.

== Next editions ==
The event will take place on

- 21 February 2021
- 27 February 2022
- 26 February 2023
- 25 February 2024
- 23 February 2025
- 22 February 2026

.
