= Storm De Beul =

Belgian YouTuber (2002–2024)

- Born: 2001 or 2002; Belgium
- Died: 30 October 2024 (aged 22–23); Jokkmokk, Sweden
- Occupations: YouTuber; Hiking, Camping, Packrafting, ASMR
- Parents: Bout De Beul (father); Elisabeth Rademaker (mother)

YouTube information
- Channel: Storm Outdoorsy
- Years active: 2024
- Genres: Hiking, Camping, Packrafting, ASMR
- Subscribers: 13.2 thousand
- Views: 494 thousand
- Last updated: 7 December 2025

Storm De Beul (2001 or 2002 – 30 October 2024) was a Belgian YouTuber known for sharing silent, solo outdoor adventures in Northern Europe, who died of hypothermia in a severe blizzard near Jokkmokk, Sweden.

He was the only child to Elisabeth Rademaker and Bout De Beul who later divorced. Storm was 22 years old at the time of his death.

== Early life ==
Storm is from the Flemish part of Belgium, and grew up in Geraardsbergen. He was passionate about the outdoors, nature and wildlife. At some point, Storm had biked 6,000 kilometres (3,700 miles) in Sweden. Storm's mother mentioned he had been taking solo trips since he was 19 years old.

== YouTube channel ==
Storm began his channel on 3 August 2024, where he went on solo hiking, camping and packrafting adventures in the natural environment. His later videos, starting October 2024, incorporated ASMR elements, using nature sounds for relaxation. Storm never strayed too far from his car and often went on 2-4 day camping trips and solo hikes. He camped with a tent, a tarp or no shelter if the nights were clear. All of his videos follow the same pattern: park the car, and do a short pre-planned trip. Storm often made fires, boiled water and cooked over an open fire. He also read books such as “Tales of the North” by Jack London.

== Death ==
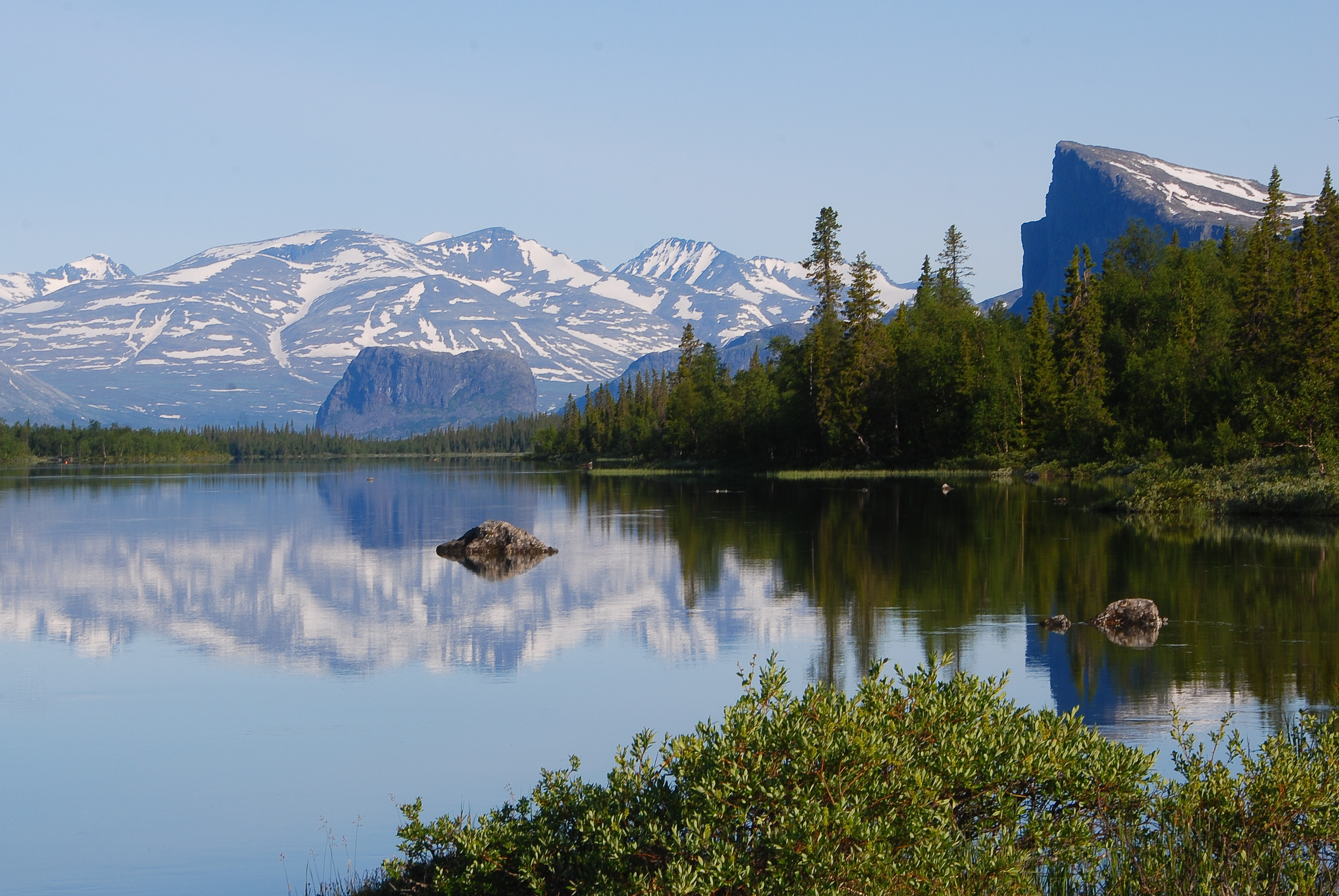
Sarek National Park near Jokkmokk, where Storm De Beul died in October 2024.

On 29–30 October 2024, Storm was hiking alone near Jokkmokk, Lapland, Sweden, when a severe blizzard struck with winds of 120 kmh (75 mph) and temperatures of −6 °C (21 °F) a wind chill below −18 °C (0 °F).

Between 2:00-2:36 a.m. on 30 October, he contacted SOS Alarm, Sweden's emergency service, reporting injuries, likely a broken nose, and requested help. His phone soon lost power or froze, cutting off further contact. SOS could not deploy rescuers overnight due to the storm's extreme conditions; winds exceeded the 93 kmh (58 mph) operational limit for AW139 helicopters, while near-zero visibility and heavy snow halted ground efforts in the remote Sarek National Park area. The service did not enlist local Sami assistance, as their protocol relies on formal emergency teams rather than community resources in such conditions. A helicopter launched at 10:00 a.m. when winds subsided slightly, locating his body at 10:45 a.m., 2–2.6 km (1.2–1.6 mi) from his campsite, suggesting he had walked toward his car, 14 km (8.7 mi) away. His death was attributed to hypothermia, with frozen feet and lower legs noted by his mother, Elisabeth Rademaker. Outdoor experts, including military personnel, have observed that such weather can overwhelm even well-equipped individuals, reflecting Lapland's volatile late-October climate. His mother speculated the storm's intensity, possibly with hypothermia-induced confusion, drove him to leave his shelter.

== Legacy ==
After Storm's death, his family expressed a desire to preserve his YouTube channel. His mother, Elisabeth Rademaker, and father, Bout, highlighted portraying him as a cautionary tale. The channel, StormOutdoorsy, saw posthumous growth, reaching over 1,700 subscribers by late 2024, with some estimates suggesting 12,000 by early 2025. Outdoor enthusiasts, including military personnel, praised his approach, noting that even well-equipped individuals can fall to Lapland's extreme weather, affirming his death as a testament to nature's power rather than a lack of skill.

Storm's passion for the outdoors was evident in a text he had sent to his dad: “Dad, it took me a long time to know what I wanted. But that's what I want.” His grandmother once asked him what was taking him there. His answer was “Very few people and a lot of nature.”
