= Geraardsbergen =

- Municipality
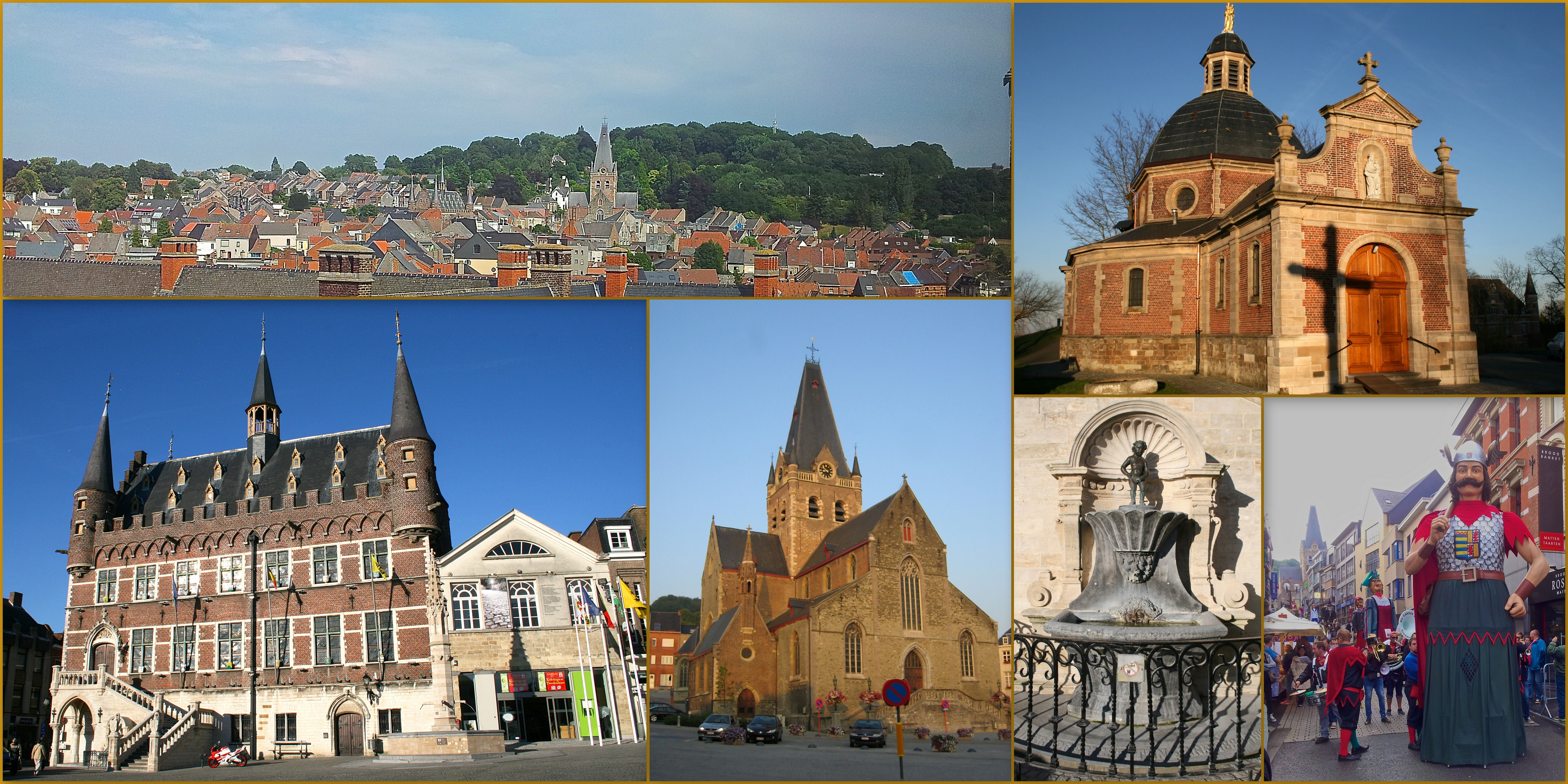
- Montage of Geraardsbergen

- Flag Coat of arms

- Location of Geraardsbergen in East Flanders
- Interactive map of Geraardsbergen
- Location in Belgium
- Coordinates: 50°46′N 03°52′E
- Country: Belgium
- Community: Flemish Community
- Region: Flemish Region
- Province: East Flanders
- Arrondissement: Aalst

Government
  - Mayor: Ann Panis (Open VLD)
  - Governing parties: CD&V, Open VLD

Area
  - Total: 80.05 km^{2} (30.91 sq mi)

Population (2018-01-01)
  - Total: 33,403
  - Density: 417.3/km^{2} (1,081/sq mi)
- Postal codes: 9500, 9506
- NIS code: 41018
- Area codes: 054
- Website: www.geraardsbergen.be

Geraardsbergen (Dutch: [ˈɣeːraːrtsˌbɛrɣə(n)]; French: Grammont [ɡʁamɔ̃]) is a city and municipality located in the Denderstreek and in the Flemish Ardennes, the hilly southern part of the Belgian province of East Flanders. The municipality comprises the city of Geraardsbergen proper and the following towns:

Goeferdinge, Grimminge, Idegem, Moerbeke, Nederboelare, Nieuwenhove, Onkerzele, Ophasselt, Overboelare, Schendelbeke, Smeerebbe-Vloerzegem, Viane, Waarbeke, Zandbergen and Zarlardinge.

In 2021, Geraardsbergen had a total population of 33,970. The total area is 79.71 km^{2}.

The current mayor of Geraardsbergen is Ann Panis, from the (liberal) party Open VLD.

== History ==
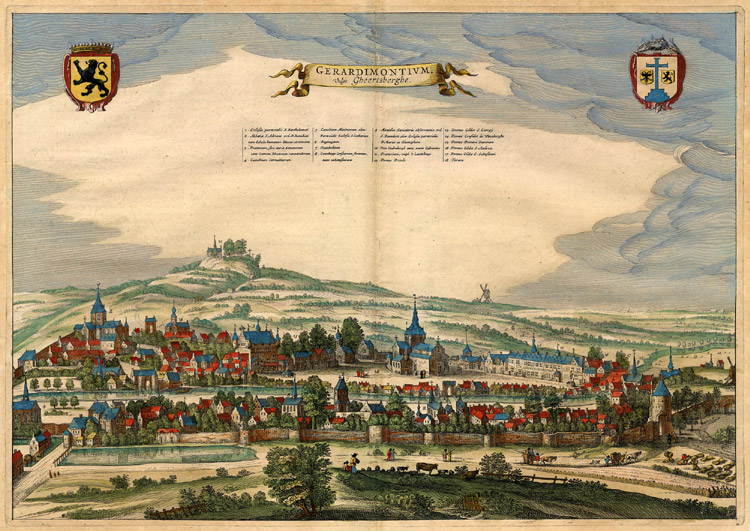
Geraardsbergen in 1649

Geraardsbergen is one of the oldest cities in Belgium. It came into existence close to the settlement of Hunnegem and in 1068 was one of the first communities in Western Europe to be granted city status.

The city was destroyed in 1381 by Walter IV of Enghien and his troops. According to legend, during the siege local people threw some of their left over food over the city wall to show that they had sufficient food to survive a long siege. This bravado notwithstanding, the city was still captured by Enghien's troops. Every year the city organizes the krakelingenworp carnival on top of the hill at Oudenberg (111 metres (364 ft)) to celebrate this historical event.

On 29 May 1815, shortly before the Battle of Waterloo, Wellington and Blücher reviewed the Allied cavalry here. Some 6,000 troops were paraded in meadows on the banks of the Dender between Geraardsbergen and Jedeghem.

== Places of interest ==
- Manneken Pis, possibly the oldest such statue, perhaps older than the more famous one in Brussels.
- The wall, a steep street paved with cobblestones, climbed every year by cyclists during the Tour of Flanders.
- Boelare Castle, seat of the former feudal domain Land (Barony) of Boelare.
- Overboelare Airfield, small glider airfield with a Douglas C-54A Skymaster (DC-4) as gate guard.
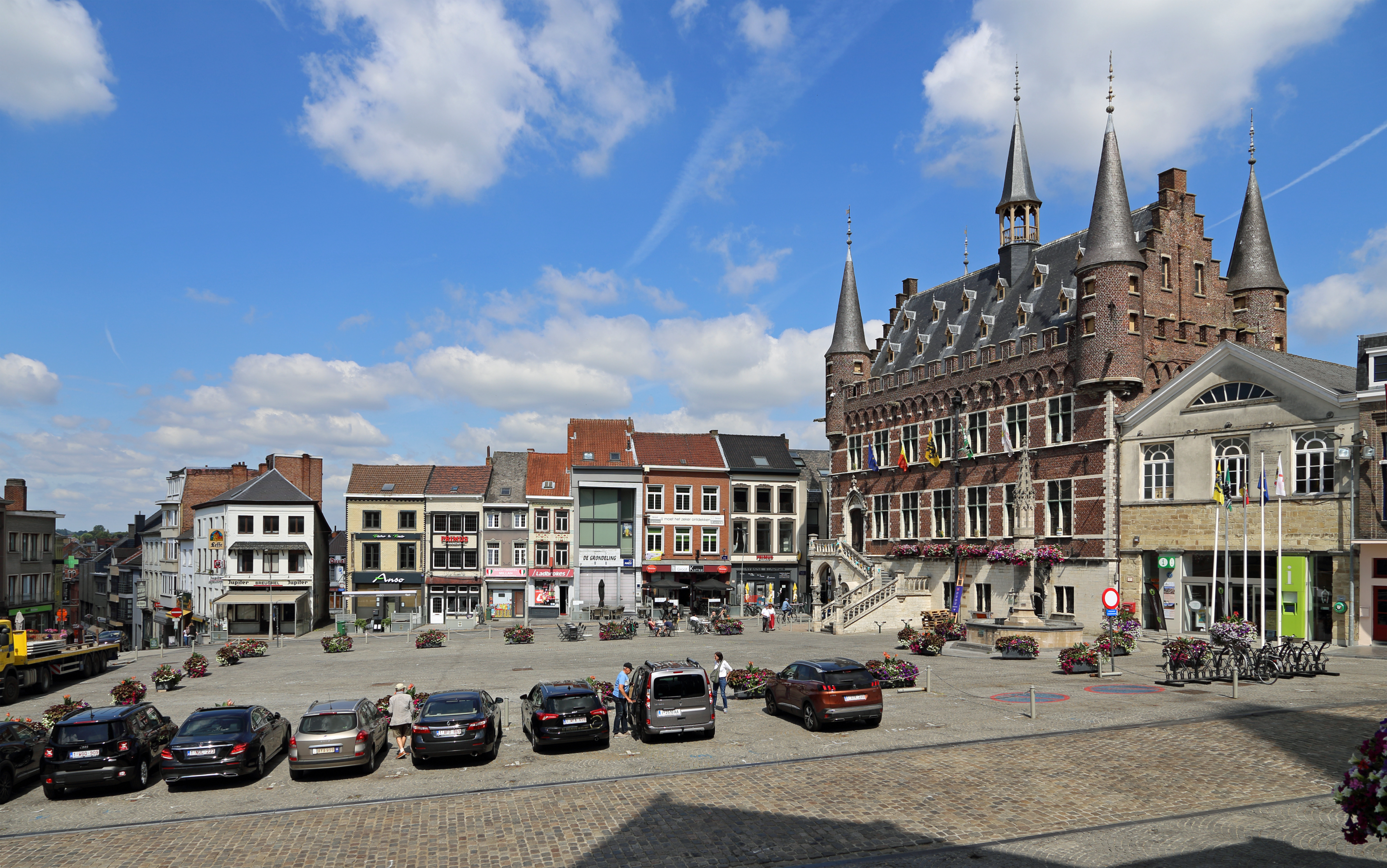
Market place

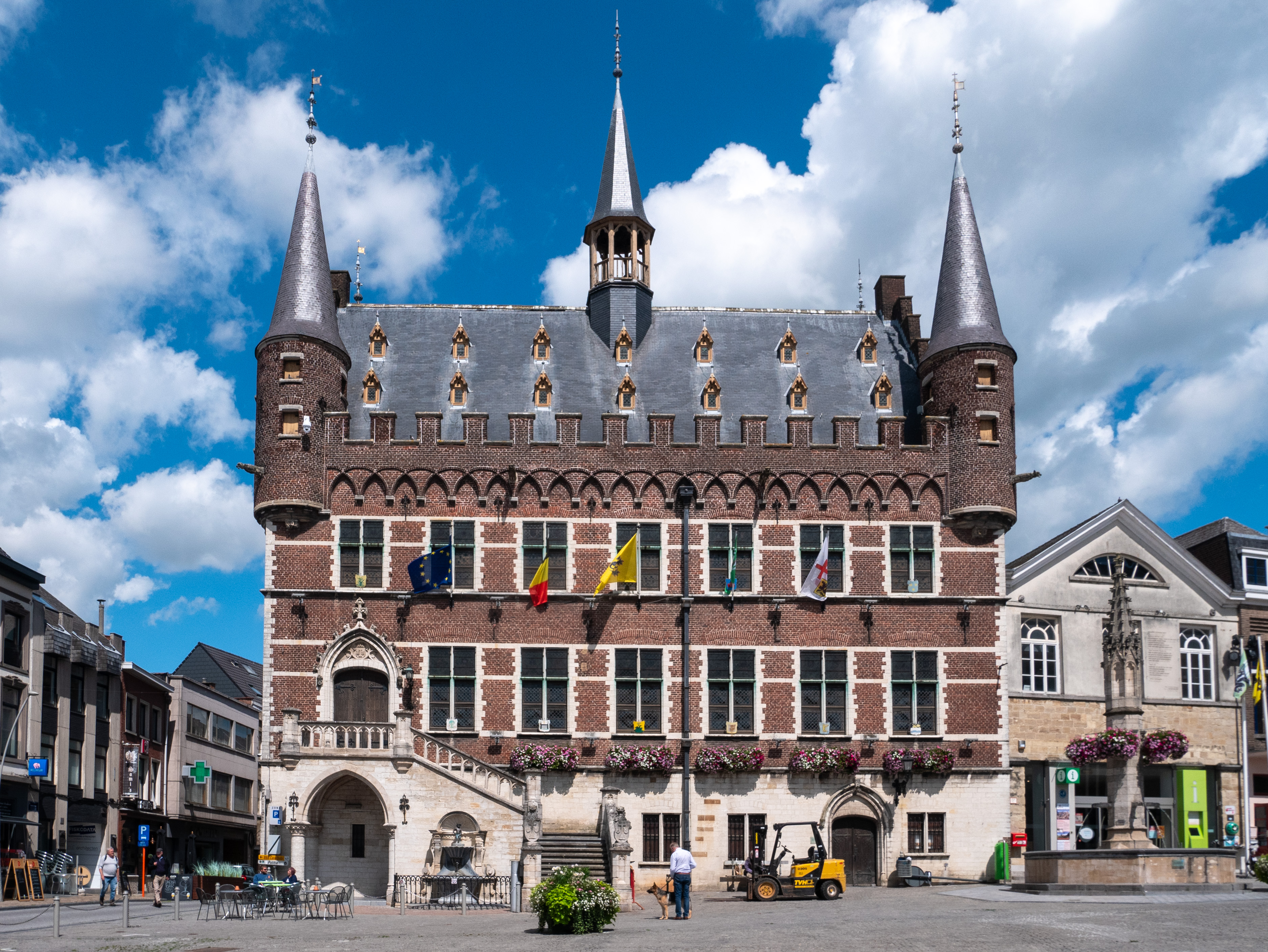
Town hall

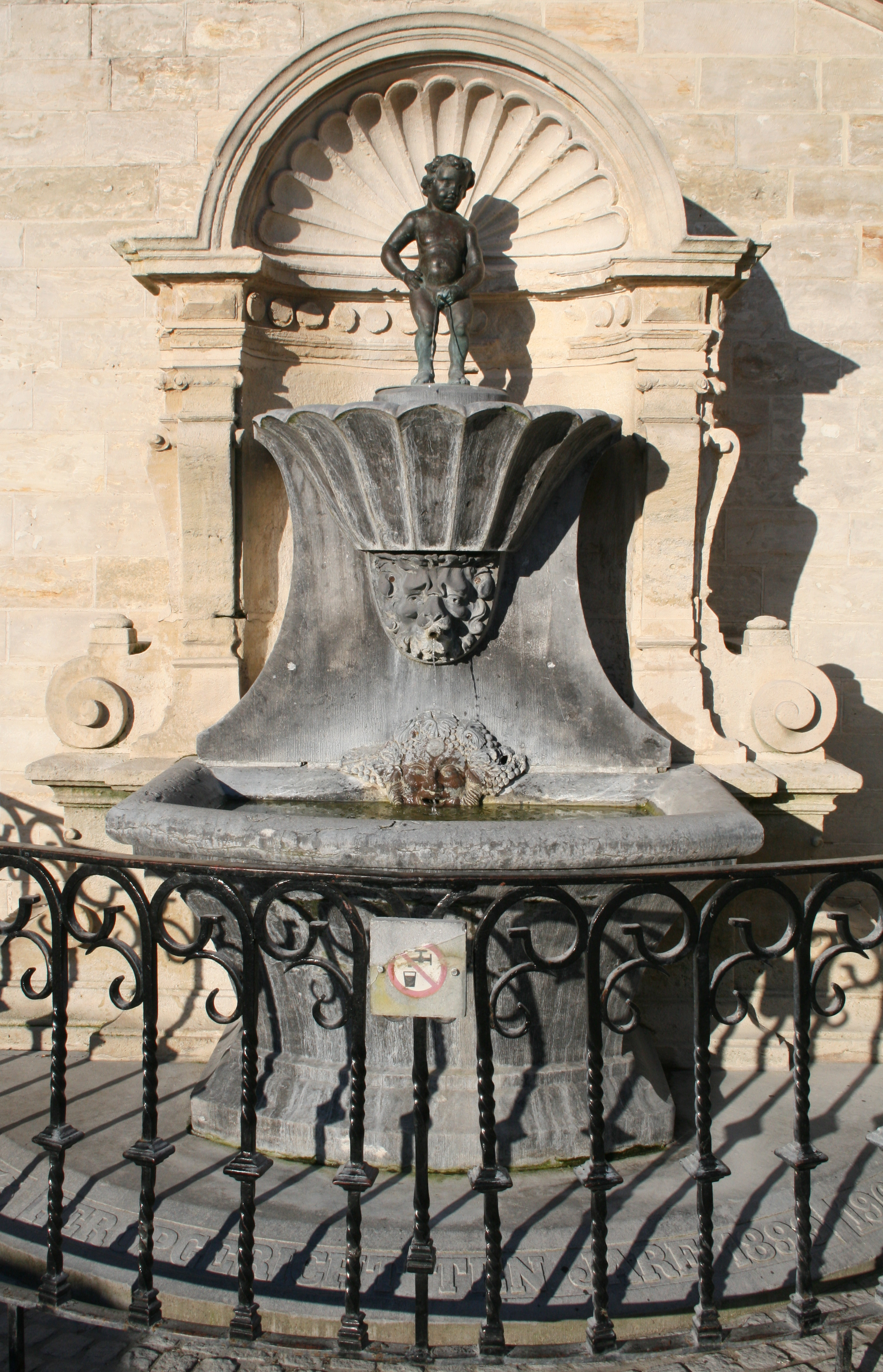
Manneke Pis is the most famous statue of Geraardsbergen

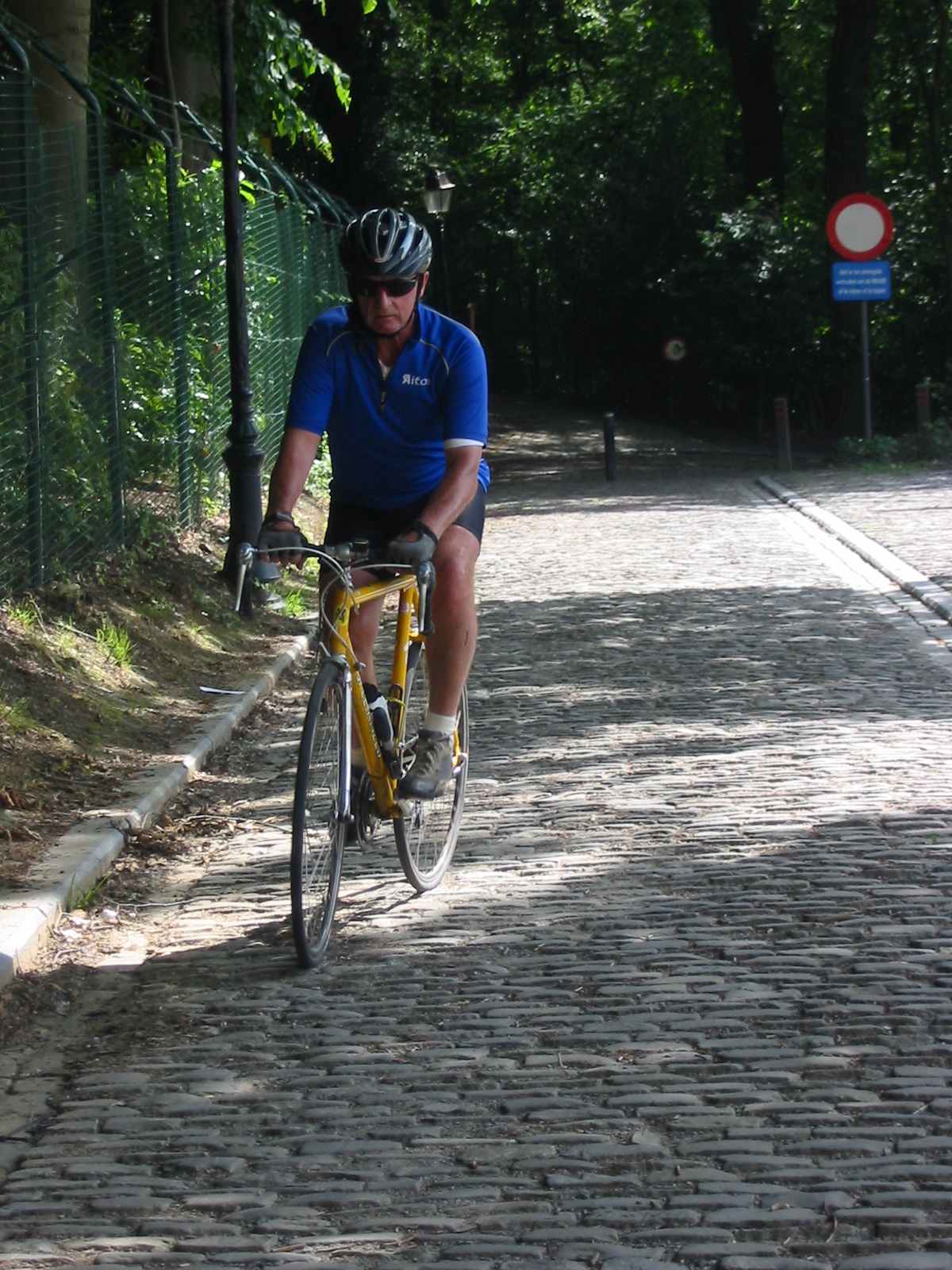
De Muur van Geraardsbergen (the Wall of Geraarsbergen)

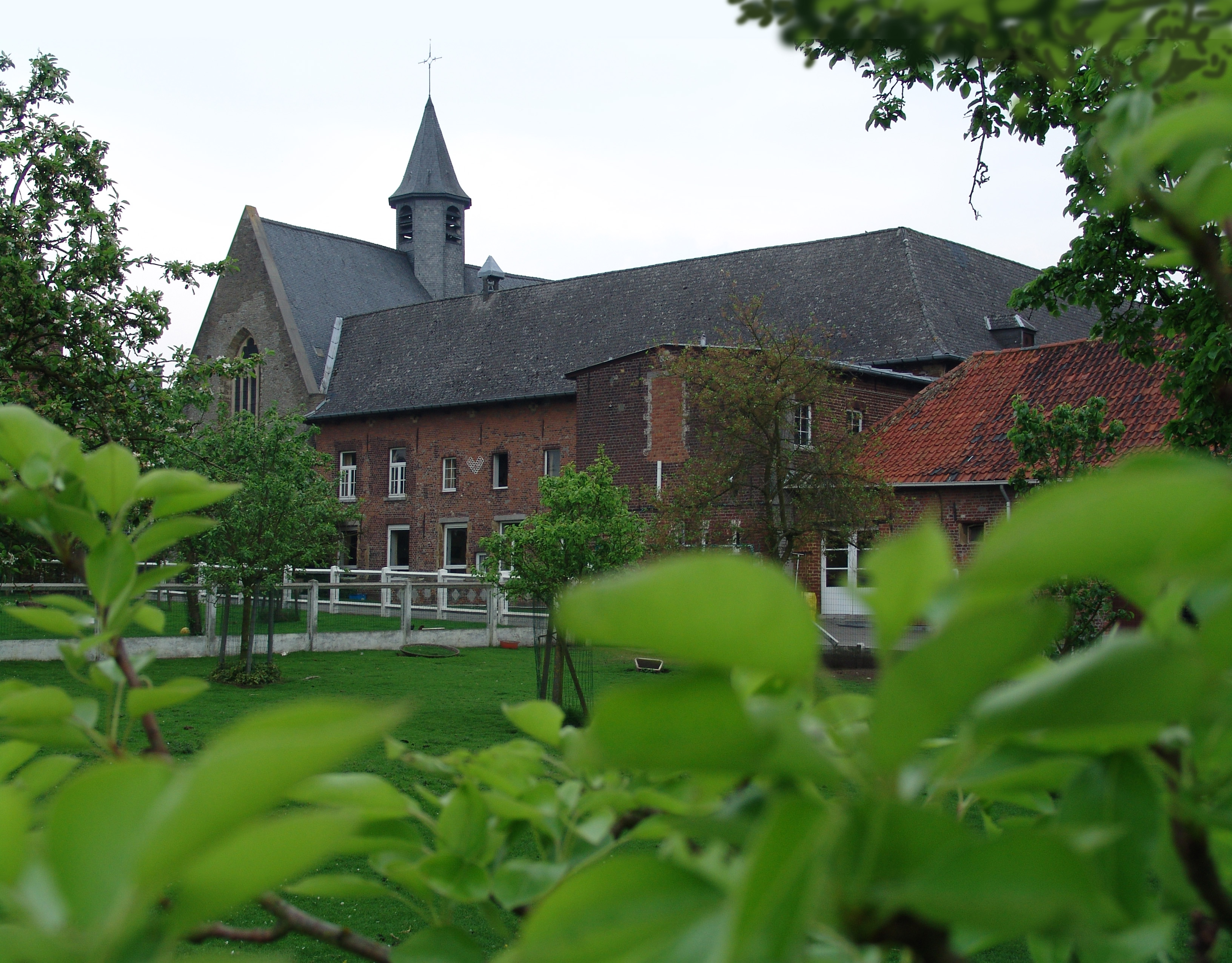
Priory of Hunnegem, 2005

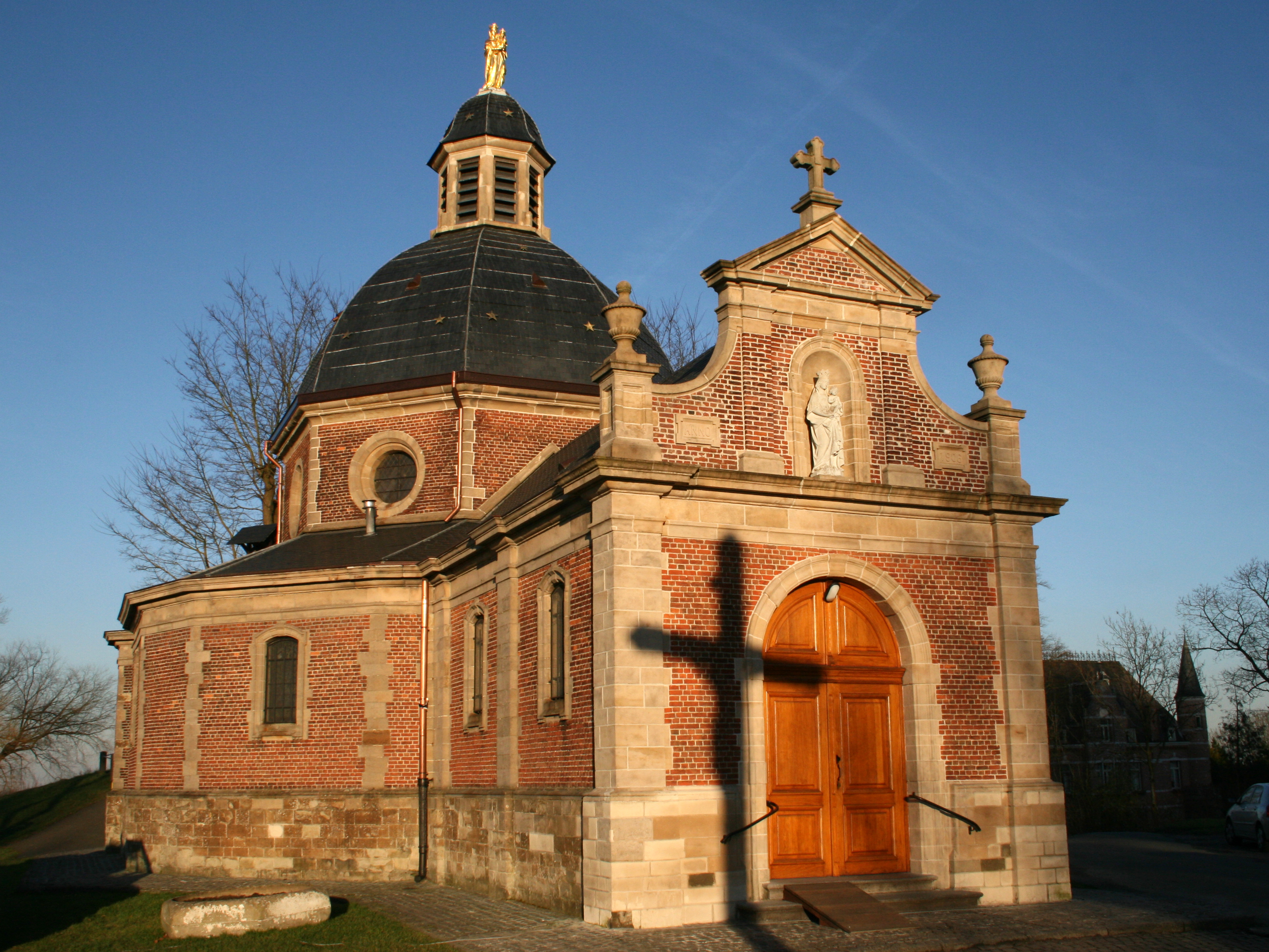
Chapel of Our Lady of the Oudenberg (1724)

== Mattentaart ==
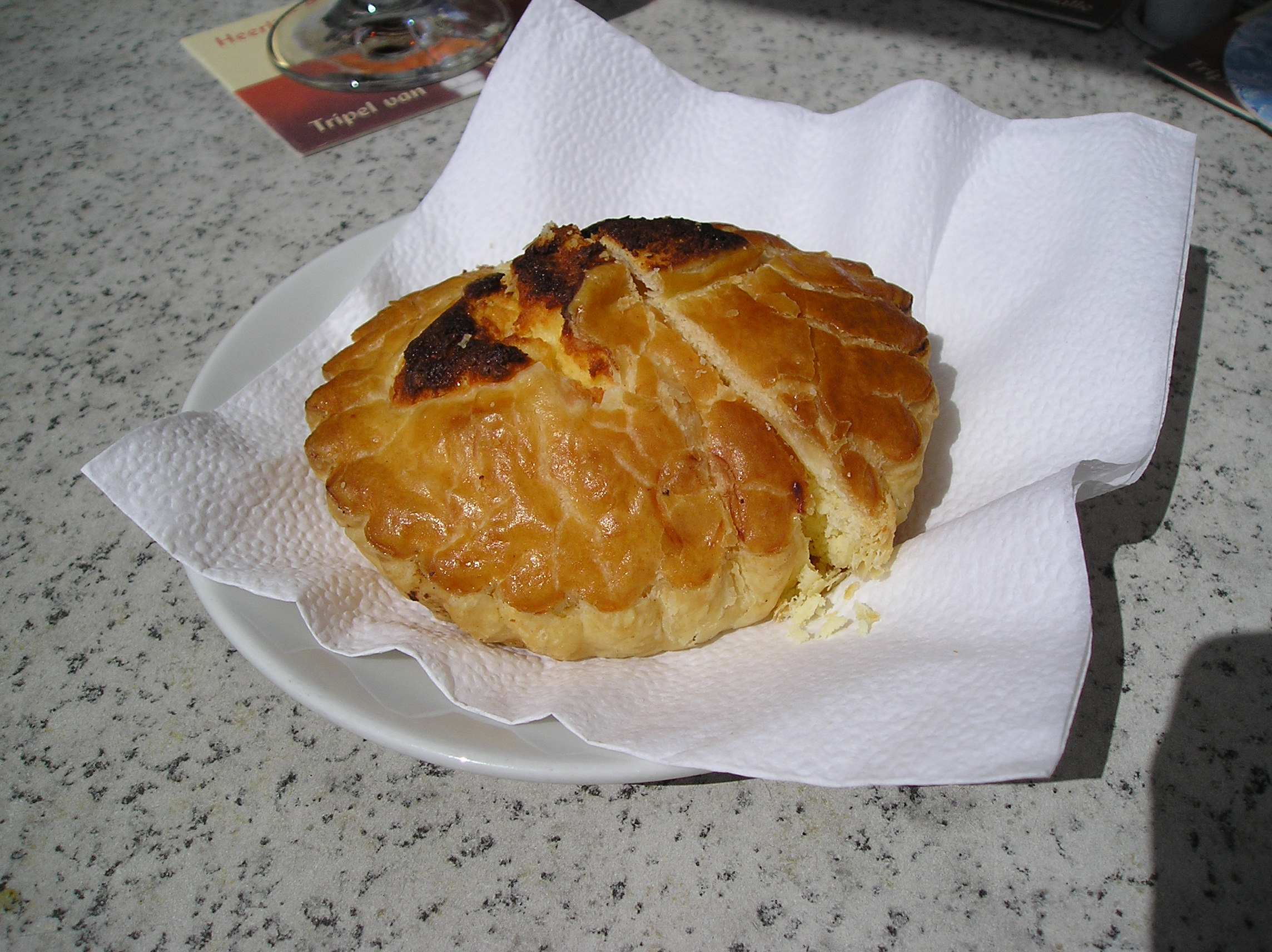
Mattentaart

Geraardsbergen is known for the mattentaart, a type of sweet pastry. This is made with matten paste or cheese curd.

The mattentaart was granted Protected Geographical Indication status by the European Union in 2006, indicating they can only be made in Geraardsbergen or in the nearby municipality of Lierde.

== Notable individuals ==
- Daniël van Geraardsbergen (1116–1196)
- William of Moerbeke (1215–1286), first translator of Aristotle's works into Latin
- Guillebert de Mets (1415–1460), scrivenist and scribe

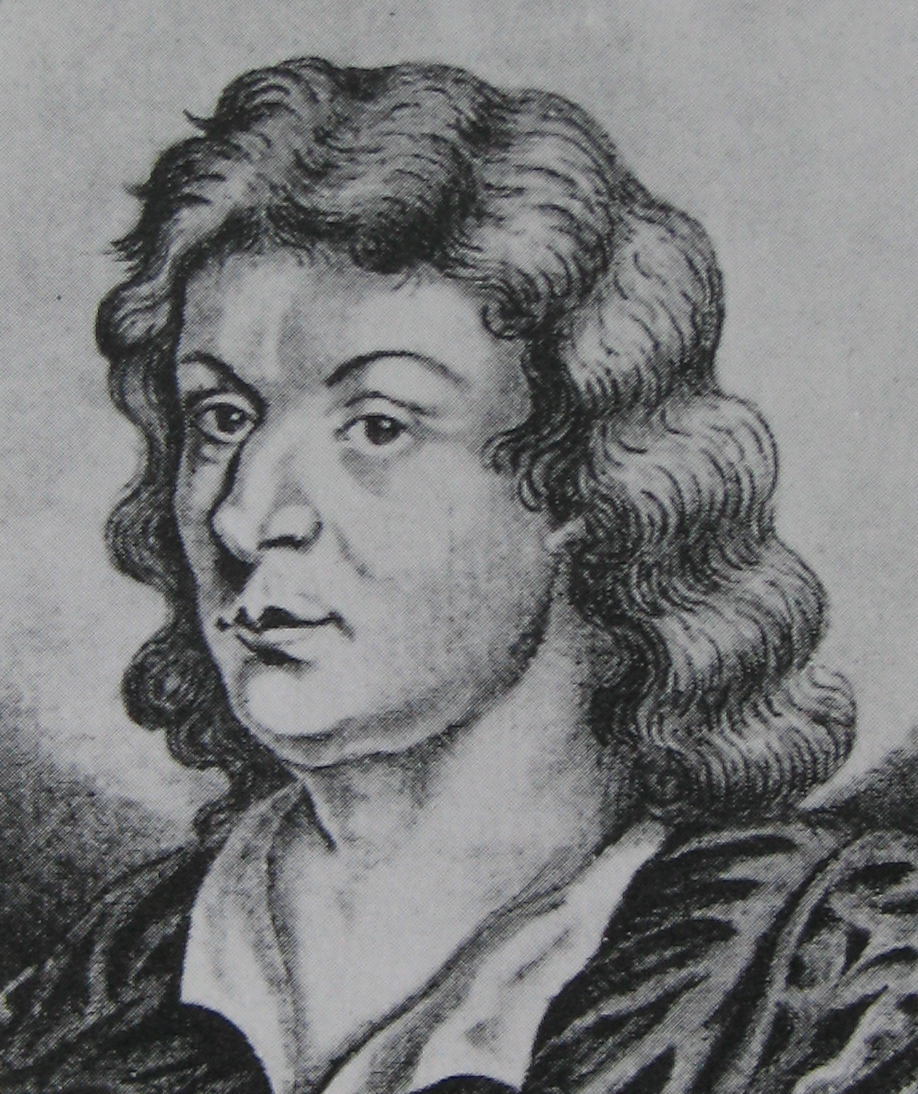
Gabriel Grupello

- Gabriël Grupello (1644–1730), Flemish Baroque sculptor
- Frans Rens (1805–1874), Flemish scholar, active in the Flemish Movement
- Robert de Foy (1893–1960), Belgian magistrate, and head of the Belgian State Security Service
- Jan De Cooman (1893–1949), painter
- Frans Van Coetsem (1919–2002), Belgian-born linguist and university teacher (Leuven, Leiden and Cornell )
- Cyriel Delannoit (1926–1998), boxer, European champion 1948
- Paul Van den Berghe (born 1933), Belgium Bishop in the Roman Catholic Church
- Ferdi Van Den Haute (born 1952), cyclist
- Guido De Padt (born 1954), politician
- Jan Callebaut (1955–2022), communication and marketing advisor and entrepreneur
- Marie-Christine Deurbroeck (born 1957), long-distance runner
- Michaël Borremans (born 1963), painter and filmmaker
- Alain Van Den Bossche (born 1965), cyclist
- Maarten Larmuseau (born 1983), genetic genealogist at KU Leuven
- Dean Delannoit (born 1989), singer
- Storm De Beul (2002–2024), Belgian YouTuber
- Eloi Sylva (1843–1919), operatic tenor
