= Boelare Castle =

Castle in Nederboelare, Belgium

Coordinates: 50.781°N 3.8825°E

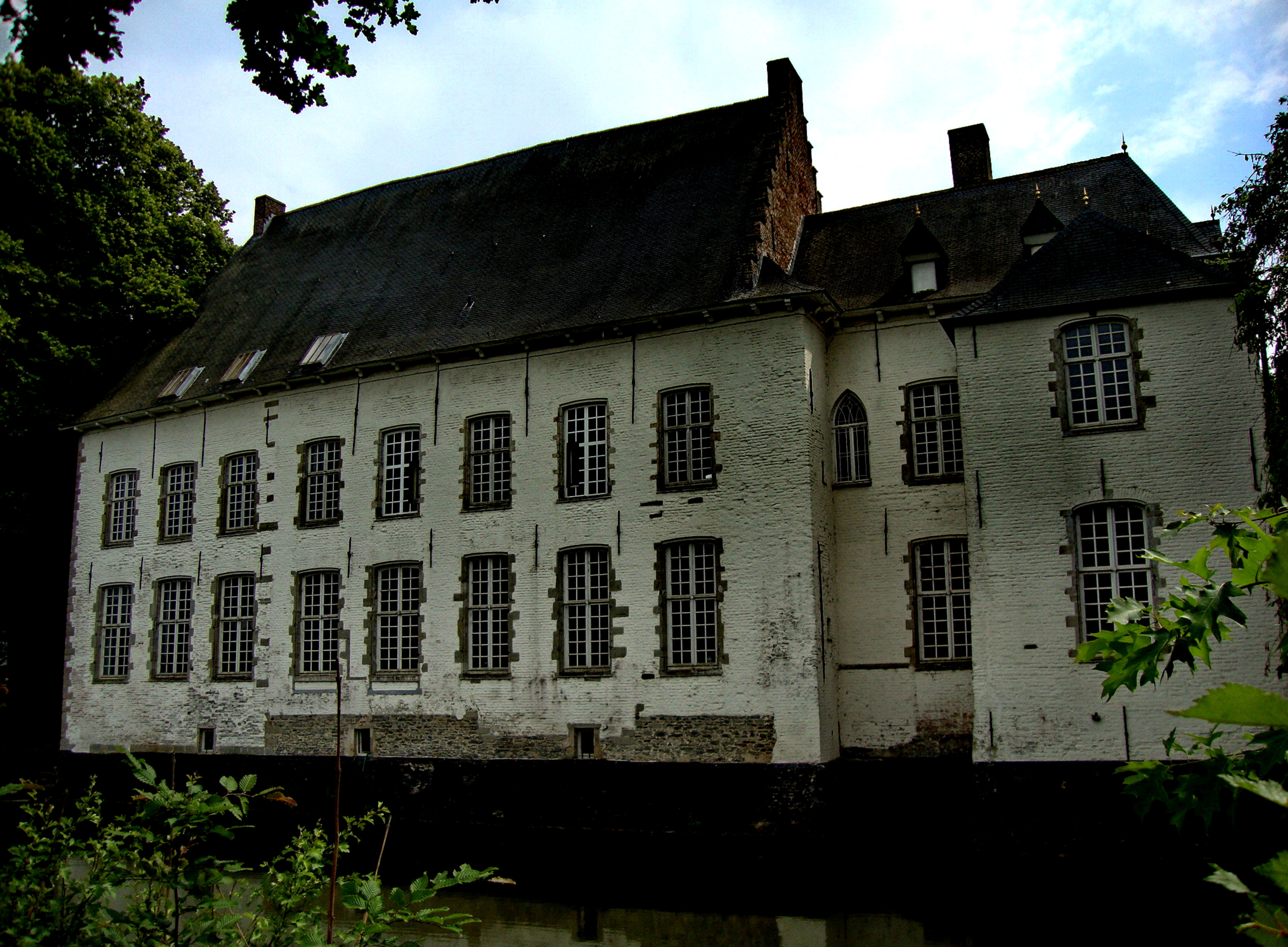

Boelare Castle is a castle near the village Nederboelare, Geraardsbergen municipality, in the province of East Flanders, Belgium. It used to be the seat of the feudal domain Land and Barony of Boelare. The oldest recording of the name Boelare dates back to the 11th century, but the domain is probably older.

Some indications point to a first castle in Boelare in the 9th century. However, the structure of the current castle buildings dates back to 1605. On 1 July 1987 the castle was classified as an important national treasure by the Belgian government. In 1983, the buildings were renovated, and are currently housing a home for elderly people.

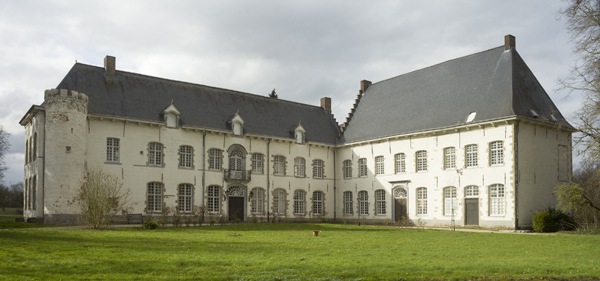

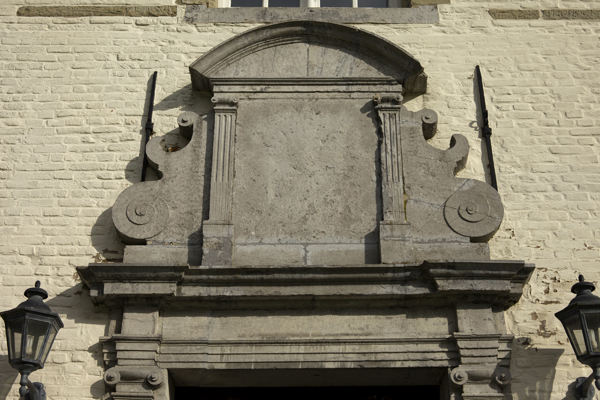

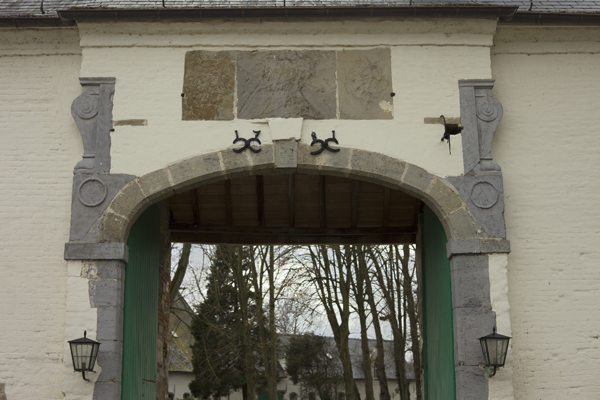

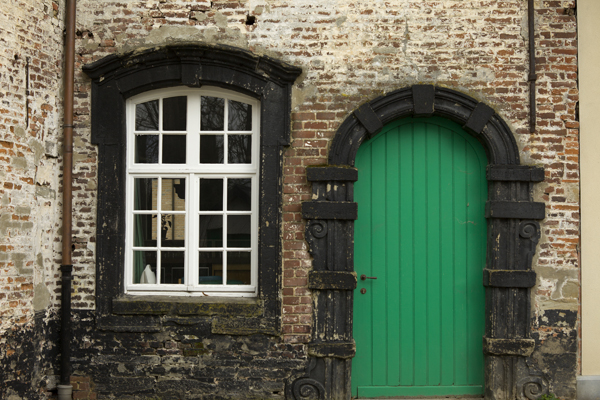

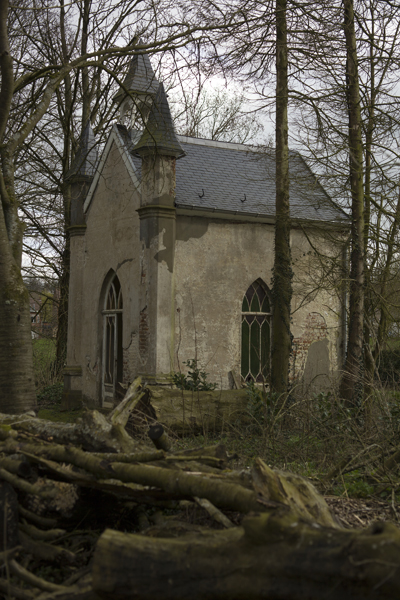
