= Jan Callebaut =

Belgian entrepreneur (1955-2022)

- Born: Jan Callebaut; 8 November 1955; Geraardsbergen, Belgium
- Died: 31 August 2022 (aged 66)
- Education: University of Ghent (M.A)
- Occupations: Communication and Marketing advisor, Entrepreneur
- Board member of: Why5Research (Affligem, Antwerp, Amsterdam), Callebaut&Co, Callebaut Collective
- Spouse: Gisele Keppens
- Children: 2

Jan Callebaut (Geraardsbergen, 8 November 1955-31 August 2022) was a Belgian communication and marketing advisor and entrepreneur.

== Education ==
Callebaut holds an MA in Marketing and Distribution and an MA in Diplomatics of the University of Ghent. As an academic researcher he developed psychoanalytical market research techniques to consumer behavior by applying the views of Alfred Adler.

== Career ==
In 1987, Callebaut co-founded Censydiam model (Center for Systematic Diagnostics in Marketing) now Ipsos Censydiam. He supplied qualitative marketing research and business strategies for companies like Coca-Cola, Heineken, Unilever, Volvo, InBev, Johnson & Johnson, Friesland and was engaged in the public sector with projects for Foster Parents Plan and Amnesty International.

Callebaut also introduced the brand approach into the VRT, the Flemish Radio and Television Network, Belgium's leading broadcasting and media concern. In 2007, Callebaut founded Callebaut&Co and became CEO of WHy5Research, an international diagnostic market research agency. More recently, Callebaut co-founded Callebaut Collective, an ecosystem of strategic advisors and partners in execution, where he currently acts as managing partner.

== Vision ==
Callebaut is one of the founders of the modern diagnostic market research. His insights on consumer behaviour based on a psychoanalytic approach is adopted by various marketing experts like Philip Kotler and Kevin Lane Keller and known as the censydiam model. The model is developed to understand better the mechanisms of human motivation.

== Personal life ==
Callebaut is married to Gisèle Keppens with whom he has two children.

== Bibliography ==
- The Naked Consumer (1994, Censydiam Institute)
- Never too late to grow old (1996, Censydiam Institute)

- Nooit te laat om oud te worden (1996, Censydiam Institute)

- Cross-Culturally Correct Marketing (1997, Garant)
- Motivational Marketing Research Revisited (1999, (Garant Uitgevers)
- Deux ou trois choses que je sais de la France (1999) – Lannoo )
- Cross-Cultural Window on Consumer Behaviour (2000, Garant )
- El Nuevo Modelo Diagnóstico Para El Márketing (2000, Garant )
- Understanding Chinese consumers (2000, Garant )
- Why yesterday tells of tomorrow (2001, Garant )

- Warum Gestern über Morgen erzählt (2001, Garant )

- The Naked Consumer Today (2002, Garant )
- Marketing is menselijk : collection of columns for the Belgian newspaper De Standaard (2004, Garant )
- Colour and Emotion: humanising the message (2005, Synovate)
- Consumentengeheimen (2009, Davidsfonds)
- Why you do what you do (2011, Why5 Research )
- Act Human. Waarom succesvolle organisaties investeren in langdurige relaties (2021, LannooCampus )
