= Viane, Belgium =

Viane
- Village
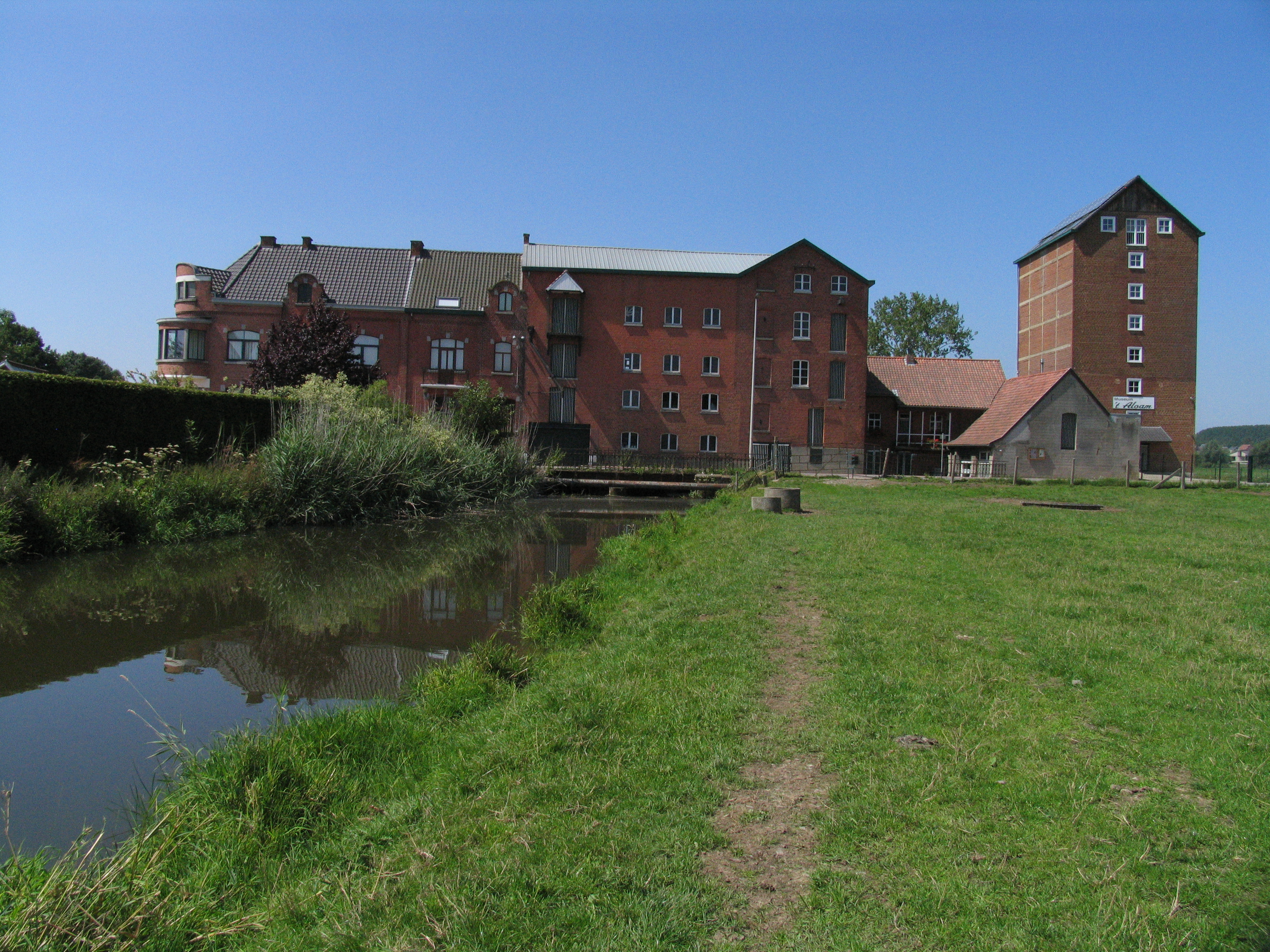
- Mertens Mill

- Location in Belgium
- Coordinates: 50.7428°N 3.9297°E
- Country: Belgium
- Region: Flemish Region
- Province: East Flanders
- Municipality: Geraardsbergen

Area
  - Total: 6.64 km^{2} (2.56 sq mi)

Population (2021)
  - Total: 1,948
  - Density: 293/km^{2} (760/sq mi)
- Time zone: CET

Viane is a village in the Geraardsbergen municipality of the East Flanders province in the Flemish Community of Belgium. The village is situated in the Denderstreek in the south east of the province, on the border with Flemish Brabant and Hainaut. The river Mark separates the village from the rest of Geraardsbergen.

== History ==
The village was first mentioned in 1220 as Vienne. The village was a heerlijkheid (landed estate) initially controlled by the lords of Viena and ultimately changed hands to the family De Blondel de Beauregard. In 1962, the municipality was enlarged with the hamlets Donkerstraat and Haie-de-Viane. In 1977, the municipality merged into Geraardsbergen. The village has become mainly a commuter village.

== Places of interest ==
- The church of Saint Amand, a neogothic church from 1843
- The castle de Blondel de Beauregard and its environment are protected heritage. The original castle was first mentioned in 1545. The current castle dates from 1762. On 31 January 2020, a severe fire destroyed a large part of the castle.

== Gallery ==
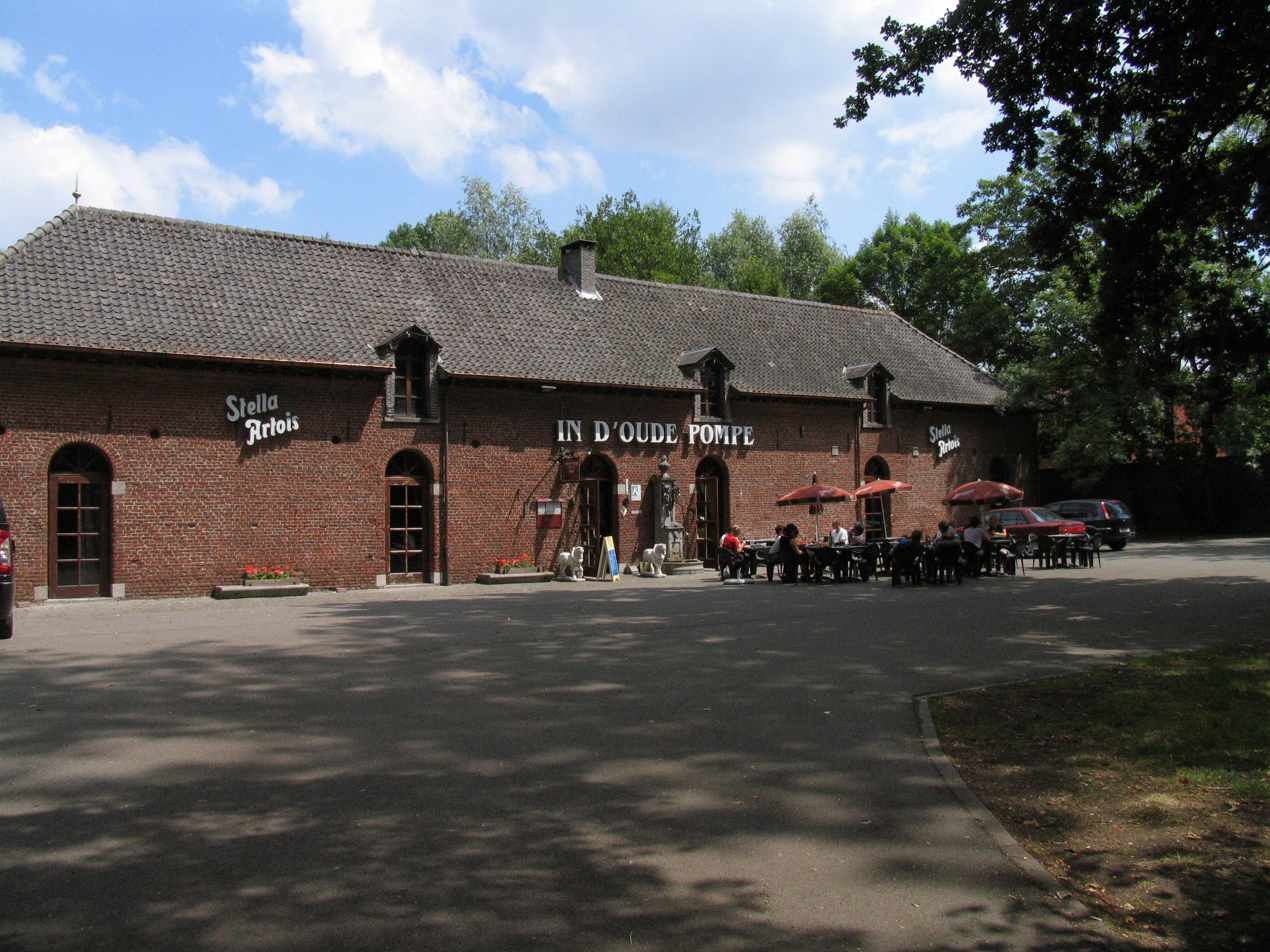
Brasserie in Viane

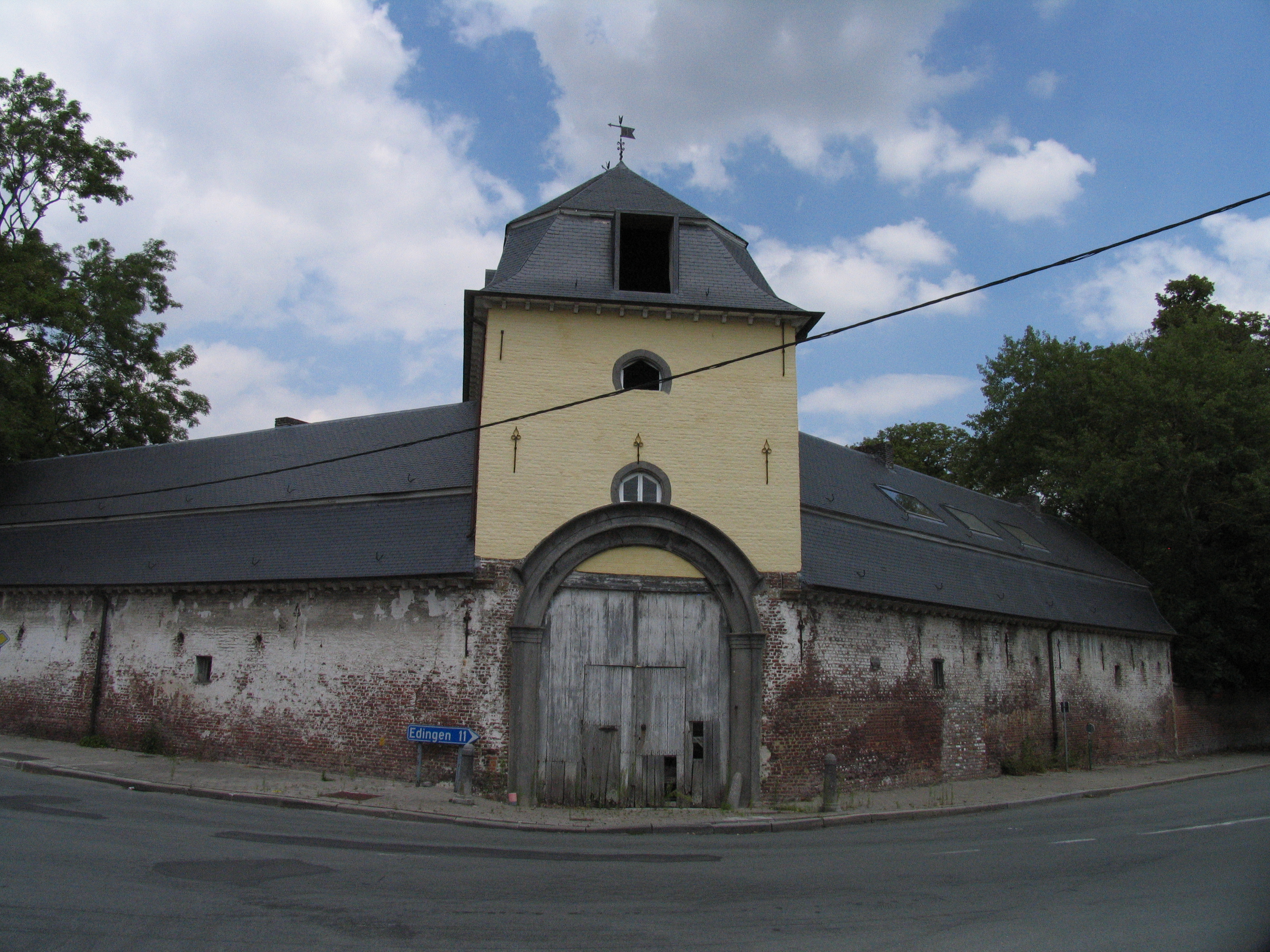
Castle De Blondel De Beauregard

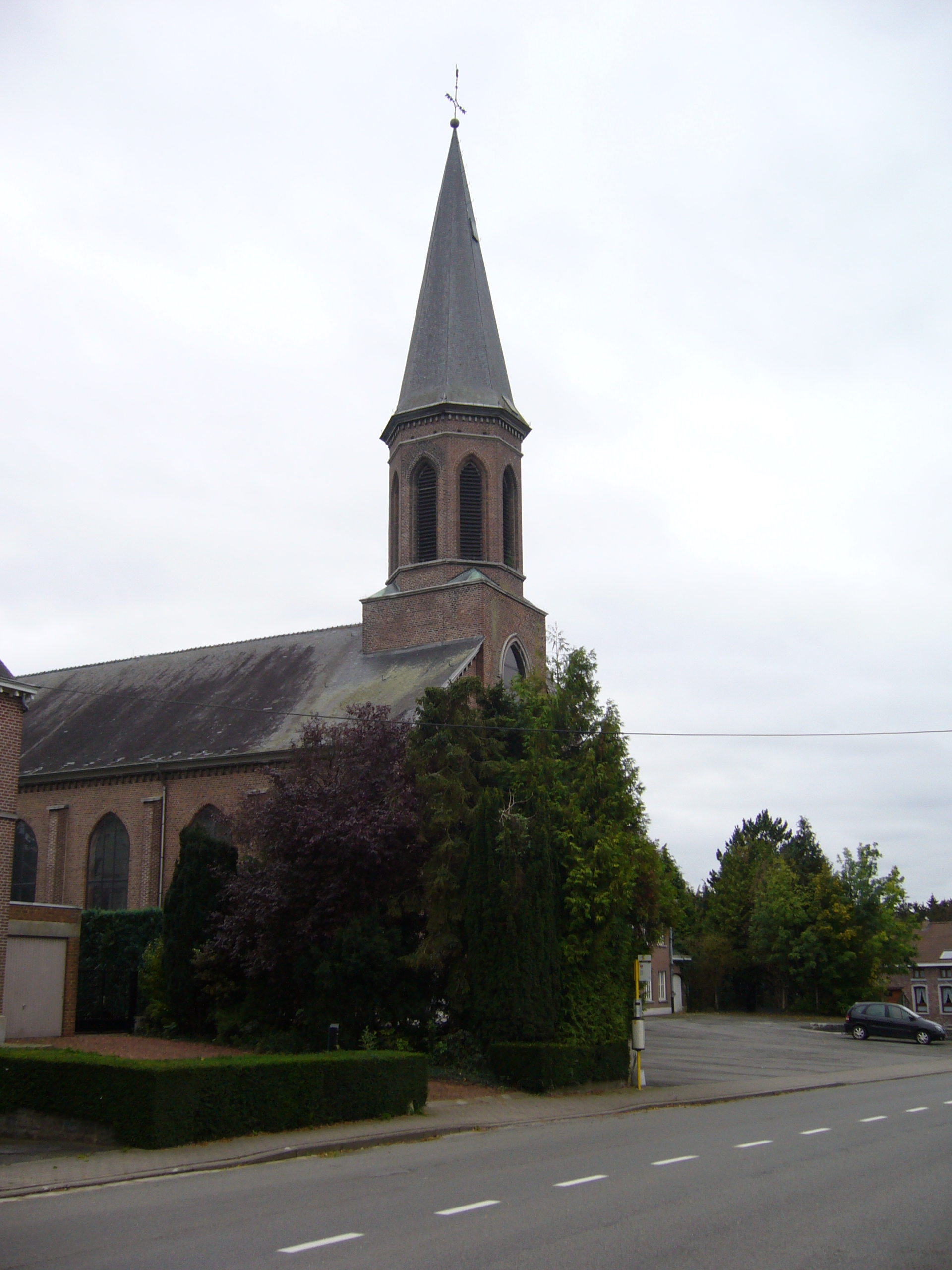
St Amandus Church

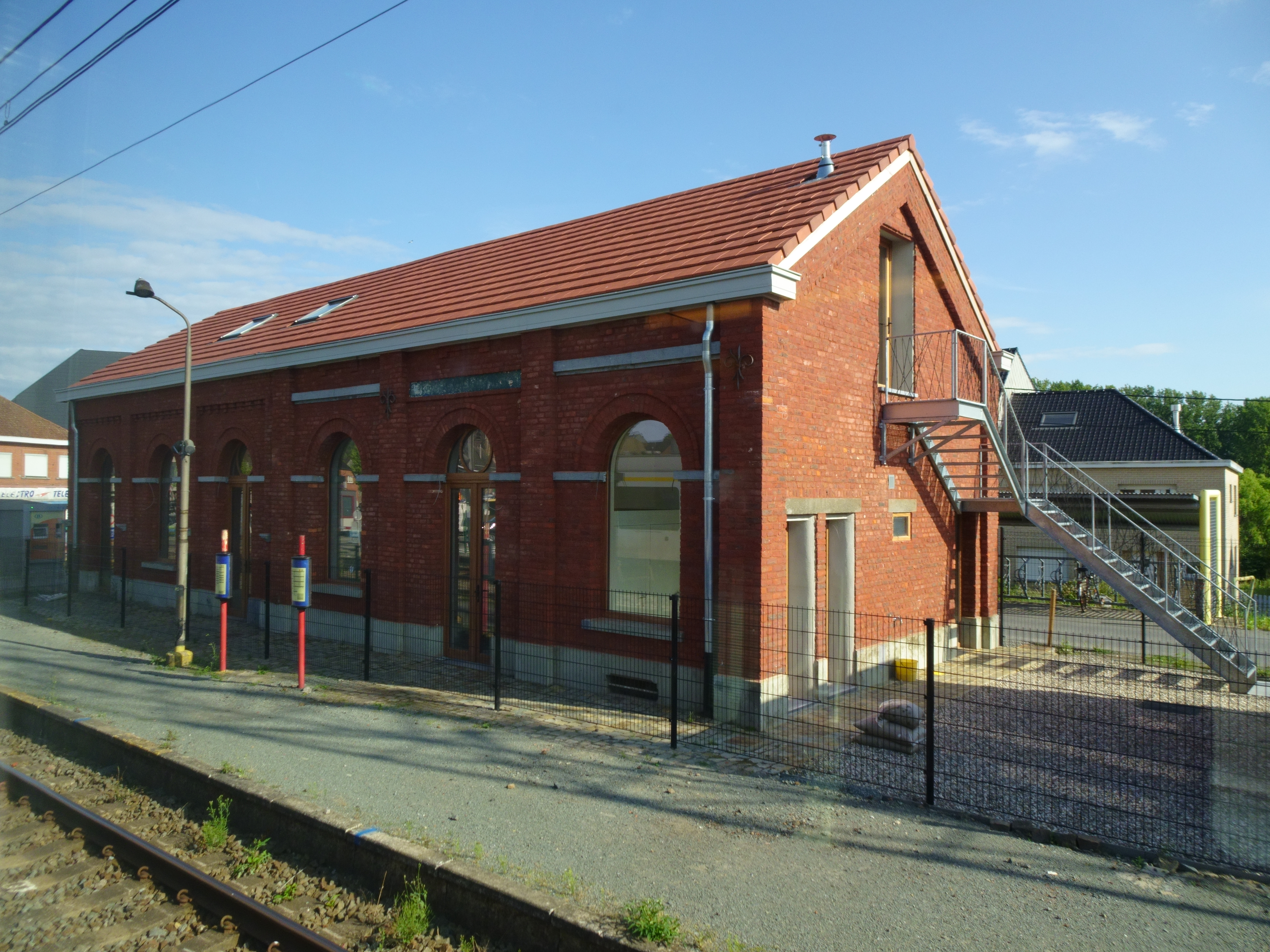
Railway station Viane-Moerbeke
