= Guillebert de Mets =

Medieval Flemish scribe and chronicler

Guillebert de Mets (c. 1390 – c. 1438) was a Flemish scribe who wrote a 1434 chronicle of medieval Paris, Description de Paris, commissioned by the Duke of Burgundy, Philip the Good. The chronicle is one of the few 15th century histories of Paris and it describes contemporary events as well as the early history of the city, including the Roman campaign of Gaul and the later Merovingian period.

Little is known about de Mets' life, but he was recorded as being a scribe for John the Fearless before John's assassination in 1419. He was also recorded as a municipal tax collector in 1430 in Grammont (Geraardsbergen), Flanders.

Guillebert de Mets copied a number of Christine de Pizan's works, based on a 1441 inventory of his estate to his children.

He is not to be confused with the Master of Guillebert de Mets, an anonymous illuminator whose work appeared in de Mets' manuscript of the Decameron.

== Works ==
- Description de la ville de Paris au XVe siècle, c. 1434, Royal Library of Belgium, LIV, 104 p. ; 19 cm.
- Transcription of Laurent de Premierfait's French translation of The Decameron, Bibliothèque de l'Arsenal, MS-5070, 263 B. F.
