= Bureau des finances =

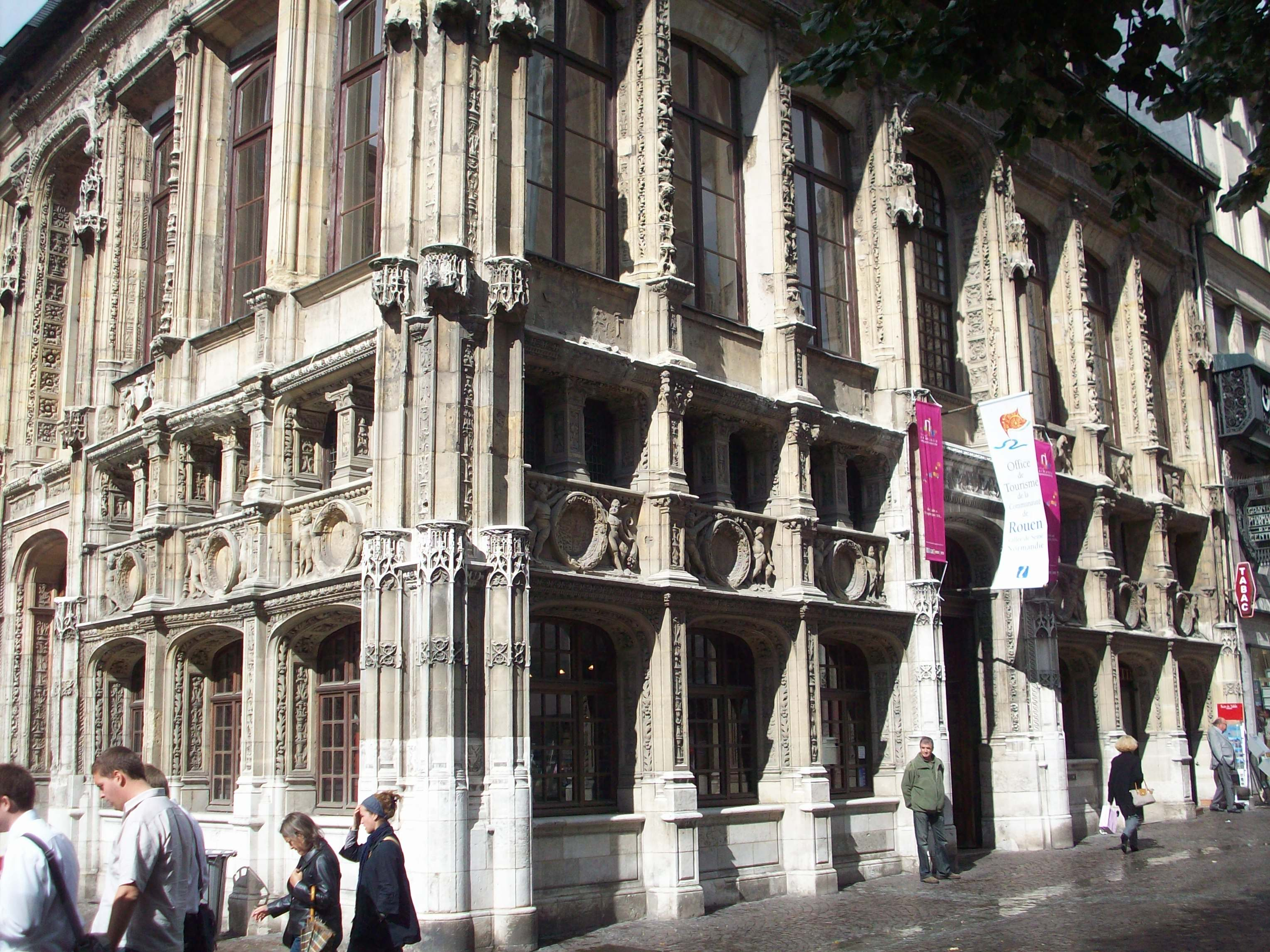
Détail bureau des finances

The bureaux (singular bureau) des Finances were regional financial administrations in France during the Ancien Régime. They were set up after the merger of the offices of Treasurer of France and général des finances into Treasurer General of France. They existed from 1577 until 1789 and underwent several modifications during that time.

== History ==
By the Edict of Poitiers in July 1577, the King of France, Henri III, created the bureaux des finances. In a ruling by the Council on July 8, 1578, he provided for their organization.
