= Roulland Le Roux =

French architect

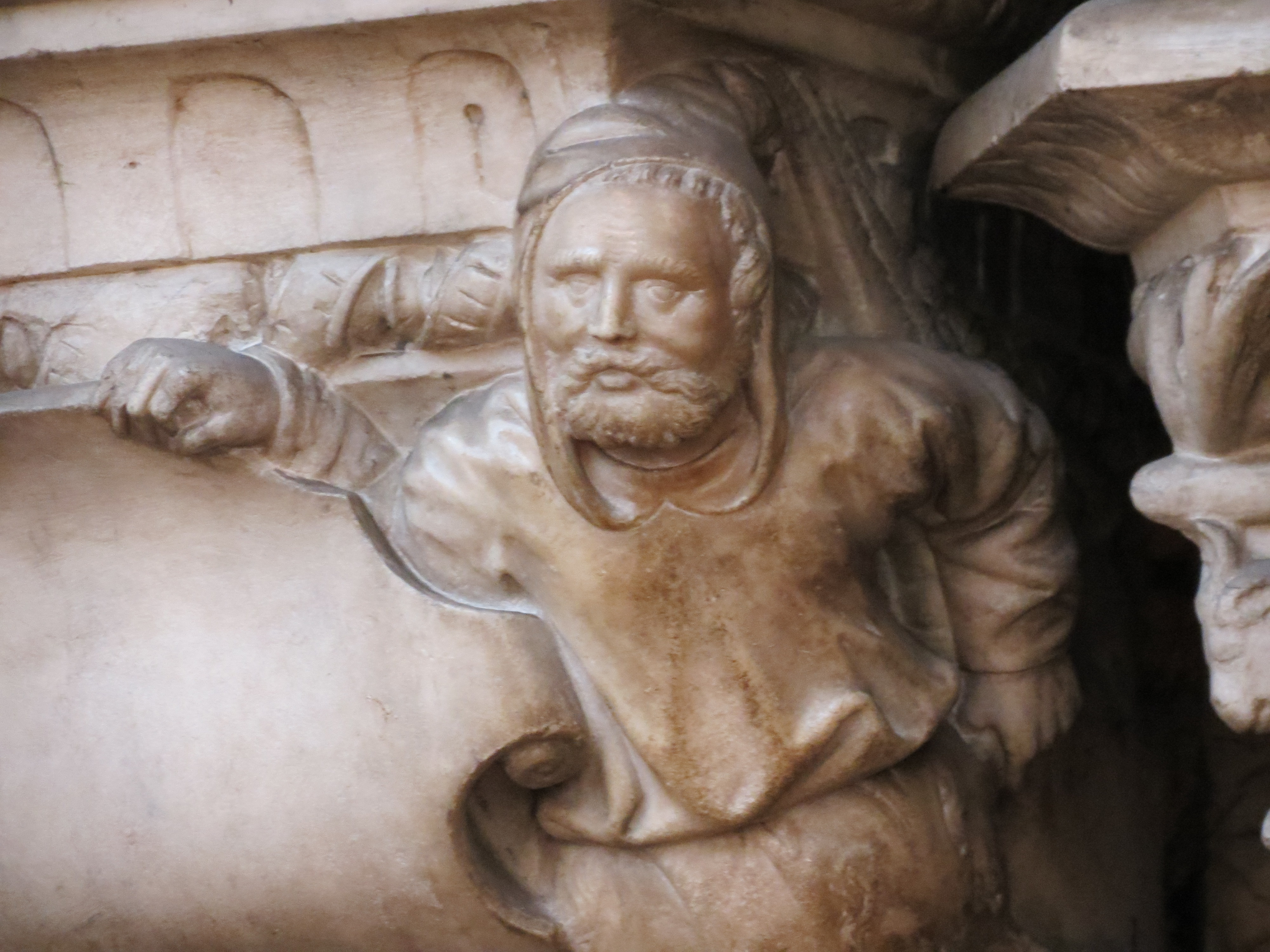
- Sculpture there representing Roulland Le Roux on the mausoleum of Amboise
- Occupation: Gothic Architect
- Years active: 1508-1527
- Known for: Rouen Cathedral, Bureau Des Finances, Palais De Justice
- Notable work: West facade and Tour De Beurre of Rouen Cathedral
- Style: Flamboyant Gothic

Roulland Le Roux (fl. 1508 – 1527) was a French gothic architect responsible for the Flamboyant west façade and the Tour De Beurre of Rouen Cathedral, and the Bureau Des Finances in Rouen. He also contributed to the Palais De Justice of Rouen.

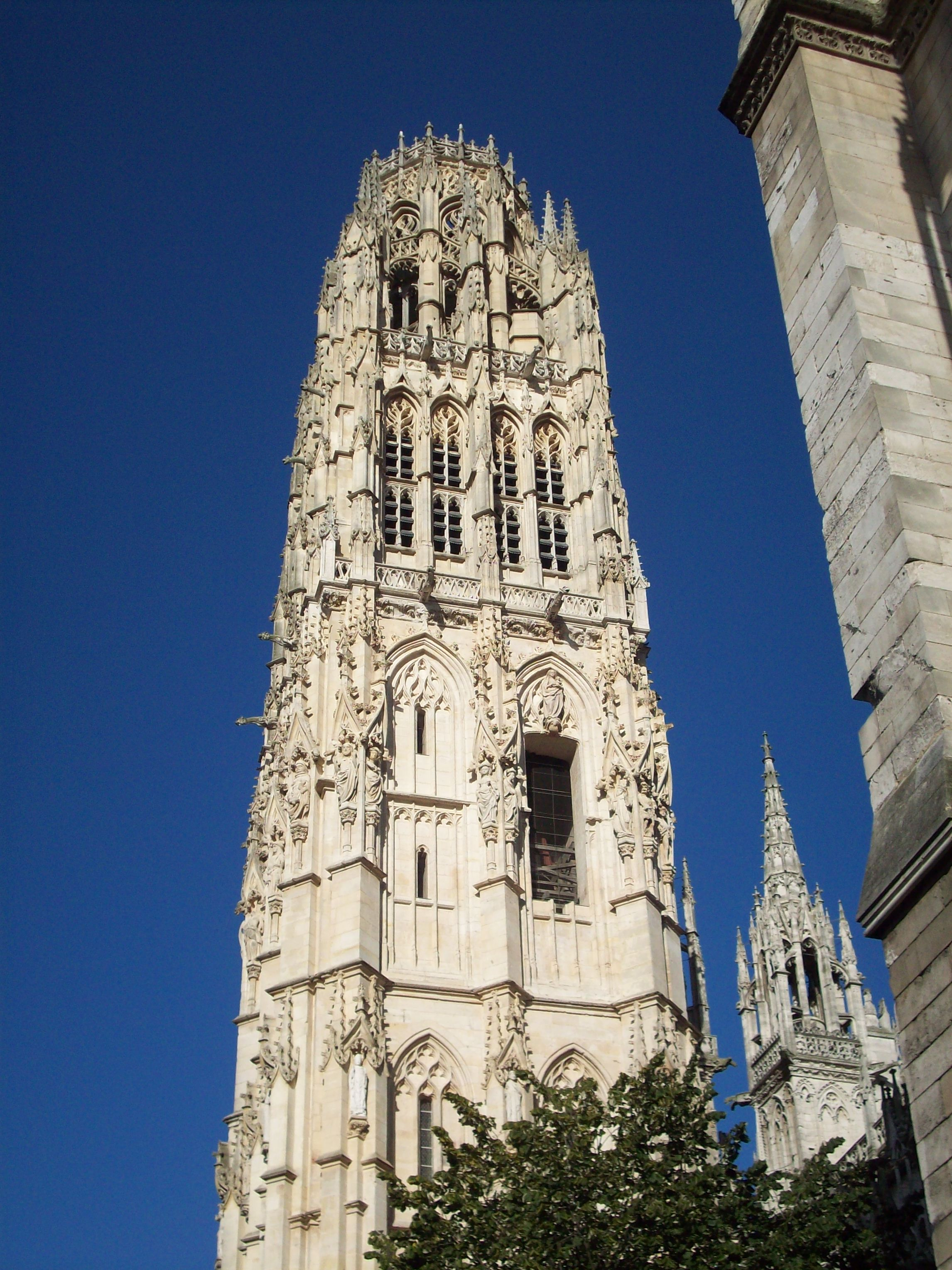
The "Butter Tower" of the cathedral of Rouen

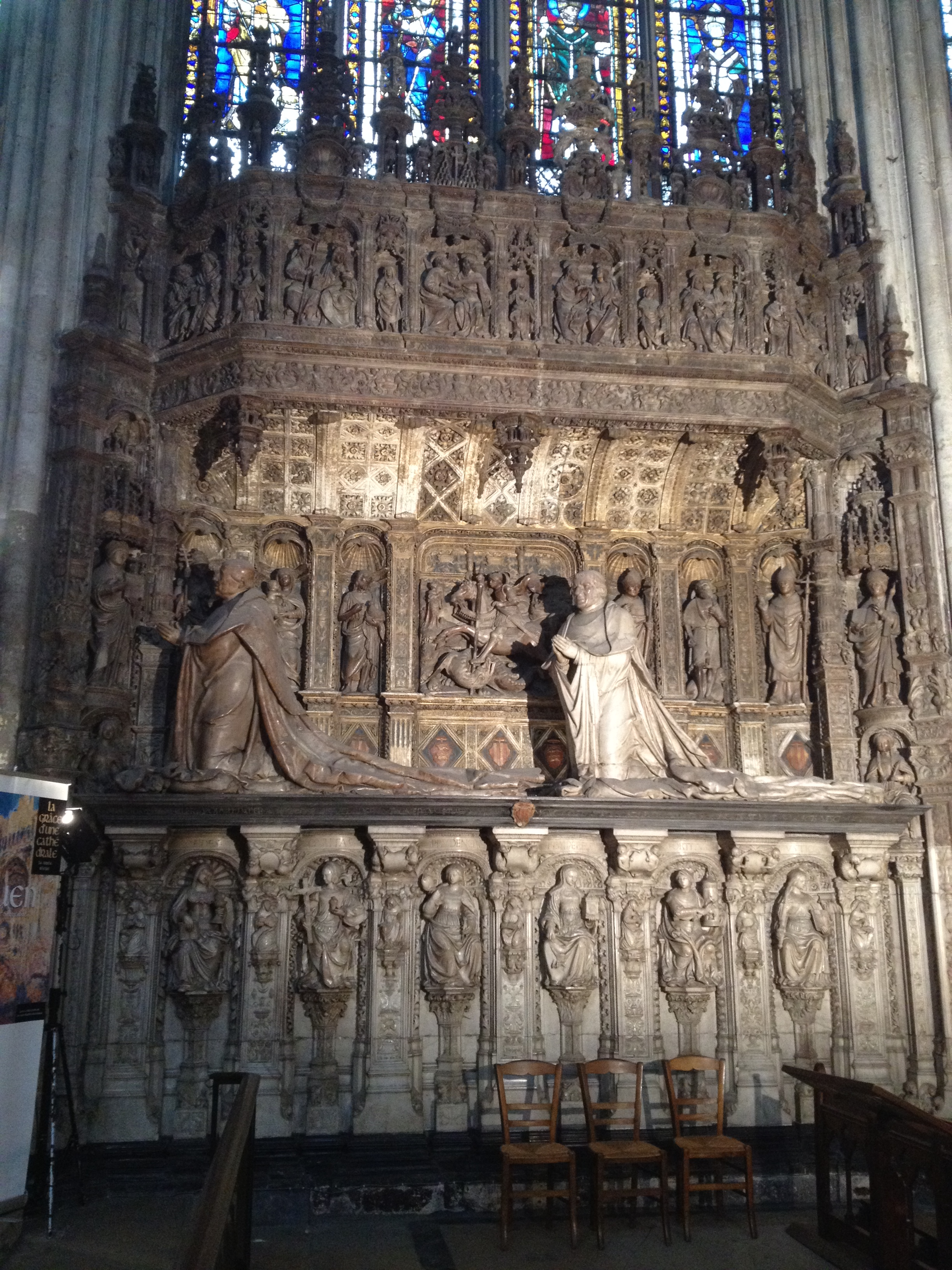
Mausoleum of Amboise in the chapel Our Lady of the cathedral of Rouen

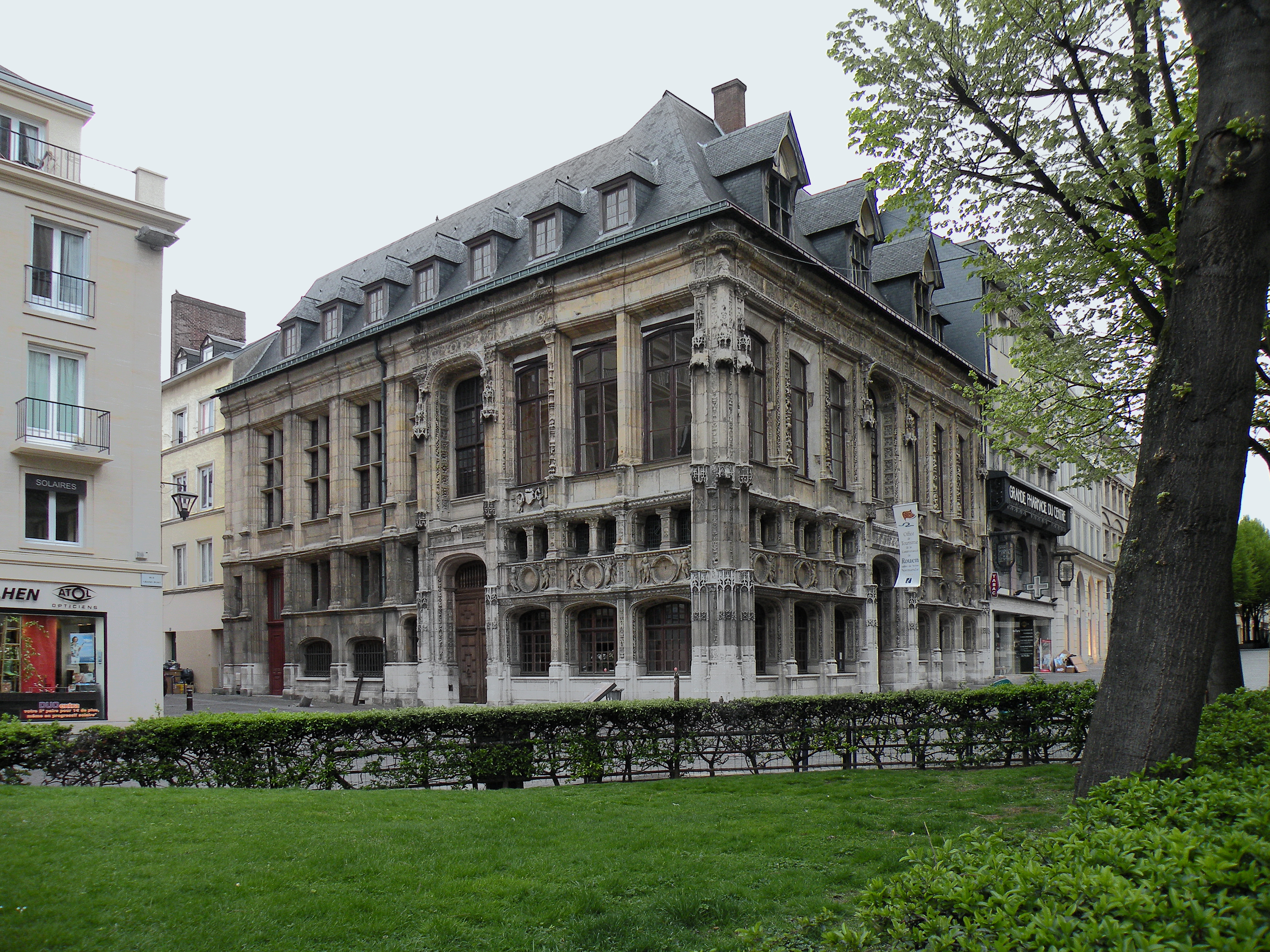
Bureau des Finances of Rouen

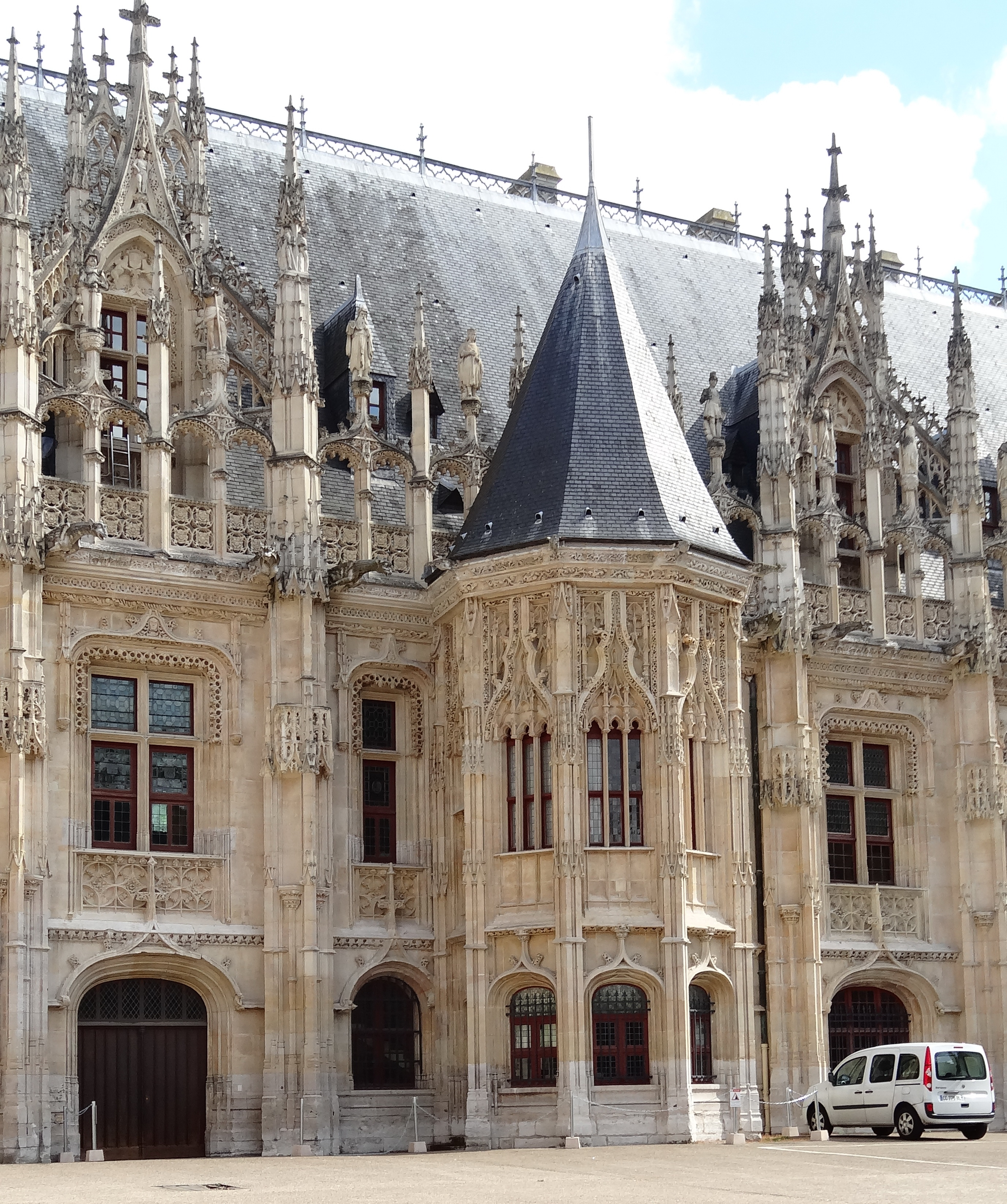
Courthouse of Rouen
