= Amis des monuments rouennais =

French historic structure organization

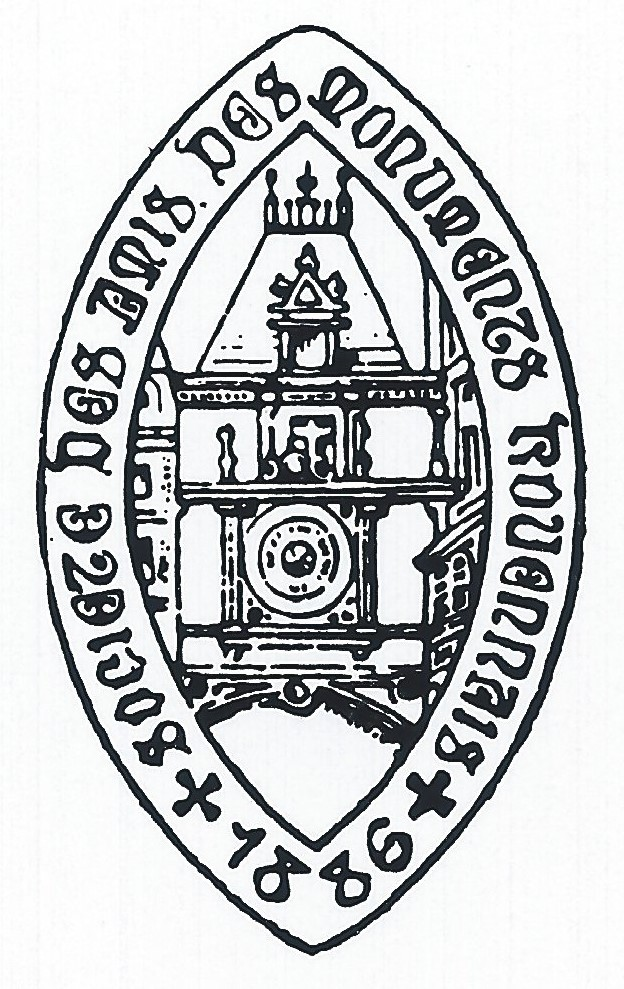
The AMR's logo.

The Amis des monuments rouennais (A.M.R.; Friends of Rouen Monuments) or Société des amis des monuments rouennais (Society of Friends of Rouen Monuments) is an association in the French city of Rouen, with the main aim of saving threatened historic buildings there. It was established in 1886 and is now based in the city's Hôtel des sociétés savantes at 190 rue Beauvoisine. In French law it is an 'association loi de 1901'.

== Presidents (honorary and actual) ==
=== Honorary presidents ===
- Charles Garnier (1825-1898), honorary president and architect
- Charles Normand (1858-1934), honorary president, architect, historian, archaeologist
- Gaston Le Breton (1845-1920), first president [1886-1898], honorary president (1901), curator of the musée de la céramique de Rouen
- Eugène Lefèvre-Pontalis (1862-1923), architectural historian and archaeologist
- Georges Lanfry (1884-1969), archaeologist, collector, philanthropist, patron and entrepreneur
- Paul Hélot (1901-1964), medical doctor

=== Presidents ===
Name	Born - Died	Term of office	Notes
Gaston Le Breton	1845 - 1920	1886 - 1898	First president of the AMR, curator of the musée de la céramique de Rouen
André Dubosc	... - 1935	1899	Businessman, chemist
Louis Deglatigny	1854 - 1936	1900 - 1901	Businessman
Georges Dubosc	1854 - 1927	1902	Editor of the Journal de Rouen
Ferdinand Coutan	1852 - 1952	1903	Medical doctor
Édouard Pelay	1842 - 1921	1904	Book collector
Édouard Duveau	1839 - 1917	1905-1906	Civil engineer
Eugène Fauquet	1850 - 1926	1907 - 1908	Architect
Raoul Aubé	1846 - 1921	1909 - 1910	Librarian
Pierre Derocque	1872 - 1934	1910	Medical doctor
Ferdinand Coutan	1852 - 1952	1911	Medical doctor
Édouard Delabarre	1871 - 1951	1912 - 1913	Architect
Georges de Robillard de Beaurepaire	1863 - 1941	1914 - 1920	Lawyer at Rouen's Court of Appeal
Léon Alfred Jouen	1864 - 1933	1920 - 1922	Canon
Charles Renard	... - 1942	1923 - 1925	Honorary advocate
Raymond Quenedey	1868 - 1938	1926 - 1928	Historian and captain of the 39th Infantry Regiment
Louis Dubreuil	1873 - 1943	1929 - 1931	Conseiller général, former mayor of Rouen
René Morin	1887 - 1943	1932	Mayor's assistant with portfolio for the fine arts, director of the Morin-Beaussart trading house
Maurice Allinne	1868 - 1942	1933 - 1934	Curator of the Musée des antiquités et des monuments historiques de la Seine-Inférieure
Pierre Chirol	1881 - 1953	1935 - 1937	Architect
Jean Lafond	1888 - 1975	1938	Journalist and art historian
Georges Lanfry	1884 - 1969	1939 - 1947	Archaeologist, collector, philanthropist, patron, entrepreneur.
Gustave Robert Piclin	... - 1973	1948 - 1949	Commissaire-priseur (public auctioneer)
Paul Hélot	1901 - 1964	1950 - 1953	Medical doctor
Robert Flavigny	1904 - 1959	1954 - 1957	Architect
Paul Hélot	1901 - 1964	1958 - 1961	Medical doctor
Élisabeth Chirol	1915 - 2001	1961 - 1970	Curator of the Musée départemental des antiquités
Philippe Deschamps	1920 - 1994	1970 - 1975	Professor of literature
Élisabeth Chirol	1915 - 2001	1975 - 1993	Conservator of the Musée départemental des antiquités
Jean-Pierre Chaline	1939 -	1993–present	Historian

== Members ==
=== Current ===
Michel Benoist - Nicole Benoist - Jean-Pierre Chaline (1939-) - Danielle Claveau - Henry Decaëns (1942-) - Christiane Decaëns - Jean-Paul Hellot - Jacques Petit - Yvonne Néel-Soudais - Jacques Marchand - Françoise Marchand - Alain Loos - Daniel Duval - Isabelle Cipan - Valérie Krowicki - Dominique Samson - Jérémy Vivier - Monique Delabarre - Michel Garraud - Bernard Marinier - Marylène Champalbert - Jacques Calu - Marie-Claire Crozatier - Guillaume Gohon - Valérie Krowicki - Jacques Lebret - Jacques Lefort - Jacqueline Prévost - Stéphane Rioland - Dominique Samson - Paul-André Sement

=== Founder ===
Ernest Fauquet (1830-1906) - Julien Félix (1827-1900) - Jules Adeline (1845-1909) - Octave Fréret - Lucien Lefort (1850-1916) - Jules Hector Despois de Folleville (1848-1929) - Jules Hédou (1833-1905) - Georges Dubosc (1854-1927) - Jules de la Querrière (1827-1889) - Barre - Hippolyte Cusson (1814-1899) - Ferdinand Marrou (1836-1917) - Charles Touzet (1850-19?) - Narcisse Beaurain (1843-1941) - Charles Maillet du Boullay (1829-1891) - Émile Frédéric Nicolle (1830-1894) - Edmond Lebel (1834-1908) - Jean-Baptiste Foucher (1832-1907) - Émile Janet (1838-1920) - Wallon - François Devaux (1840-1904) - Louis Loisel (1843-1894) - Louis-Gabriel Bellon (1819-1899) - François Depeaux (1853-1920) - E. Pineau - Raphaël Garretta (1851-1930) - Valérius Leteurtre (1837-1905) - Edmond Bonnet - Albert Fromage (1843-1904)

=== Former ===
Gaston Le Breton (1845-1920) - Léon de Vesly (1844-1920) - André Dubosc (-1935) - Georges Dubosc (1854-1927) - Raoul Aubé (1846-1921) - Édouard Duveau (1839-1917) - Narcisse Beaurain - Edmond Bonet - Émile Bellon - Charles Collette - G. Debray - Louis Deglatigny (1854-1936) - François Depeaux (1853-1920) - F. Devaux - Ernest Fauquet - Eugène Fauquet (1850-1926) - J. Félix - J.-B. Faucher - A. Fleury - Albert Fromage (1843-1904) - R. Garreta - Onésime Geoffroy - Émile Janet - Jules Lecerf - Lucien Lefort (1850-1916) - Legrip - Ferdinand Marrou (1836-1917) - G. Moïse - V. Quesné - Paul Toutain - A. Witz - Marie - Raoul Brunon (1854-1929) - Balley - Antonio Keittinger (1855-1902) - Henri Delamare - Paul Brunon - Gustave Leseigneur - Ruel Martin - René Martin - François Hue - Levesque - Élie Percepied - Édouard Pelay (1842-1921) - Ferdinand Coutan (1852-1952) - Leverdier - Desmonts - Guérin - Jean Lafond (1888-1975) - Émile Schneider - Georges Lemeilleur - Henri Gadeau de Kerville (1858-1940) - Le Testu - Émile Bellon - Marcel Cartier (1861-1926) - Émile Fauquet - Chivet - Julien Loth (1837-1913) - Héron - Paul Pinchon - Roncero y Martinez - Lamain - Paul Piquet - Henri Hie - Marcel Nicolle (1871-1934) - G. Laurent - Lancesseur - Lassire - Héaullé - Denize - J. Fontaine - Brunet-Debaines - A. de Rothiacob - Albert Lambert - Chédanne - Lestringant - Raymond Loisel - Delarue - G. Vallée - Le Villain - Laborde - Latouche - Heurion - Lefèvre-Mézand - Ernest Delaunay (1854-1939) - Armand Descande - Paul Barre - E. Simon - A? Boutrolle - Julien Robert - Montier - Morel - Dardel - Lamy - Léon Coutil (1856-1943) - Richard Waddington (1838-1913) - François-Xavier Knieder (-1904) - Lucien Deglatigny - C. Caill - Louvet-Renaux - G. Girieud - Lambard - Thénard - Édouard Delabarre (1871-1951) - Abel Blanchet - Georges de Robillard de Beaurepaire (1863-1941) - Verpillot - Keittinger - Daniel Lenoir - Calippe - Paissard - Stanislas Villette - Mainnemare - Charles Leblond - Robert Lesage - Louis Dupendant - Laurent Trévoux - Pierre Le Verdier - Bernard Héronchelle - Lesourd - Giraud - Augé - Robert de Pomereu (1860-1937) - G. Chavoutier - Ridel - Gaston Lévy - Bonet-Paon - Le Plé - Le Bocq - Auguste Jeanne - Wilhelm - Ravenez - Henri Cavrel - Maurice Lemarchand - Paul Baudoüin (1844-1931) - Sevin - Augustin Le Marchand - A. Chevalier - Martin - Allais - Auguste Leblond - Georges Ruel (1860-1942) - Georges Privey - Gaston Bertel - Armand Le Corbeiller - Vaumousse - Hoffman - Georges Monflier - Georges Drouet - Achille Manchon - Louis Prévost - H. Godron - Manfred Wanckel - Georges Delacaisse - Pierre Derocque (1872-1934) - Maurice Nibelle (1860-1933) - Foucher fils - Henri Geispitz - Octave Marais - Henri Huet - G.-A. Godillot - André Dubosc - Joseph Dépinay - Taupin - Laquerière - Ch. Sahut - Pierre Chirol (1881-1953) - Albert Letourneur - Roussel - Bourgeois - Cartier - Maurice Allinne (1868-1942) - Jean-Pierre Bardet (1937-) - Louis Boucher (1857-1940) - Raymonde Bouttier (-1997) - Charles Brisson (1890-1979) - Alfred Cerné (1856-1937) - Élisabeth Chirol (1915-2001) - Louis Dubreuil (1873-1943) - Jeanne Dupic (1901–1984) - Henri Labrosse (1880-1942) - Daniel Lavallée (1925-1989) - Paul Le Cacheux (1873-1938) - Georges Liebert (-1951) - Raymond Quenedey (1868-1938) - Patrice Quéréel (1946-2015) - René Rouault de la Vigne (1889-1985) - Georges Vanier (1877-1961) - Pierre-René Wolf (1899-1972) - Lucien-René Delsalle (1935-2018)

== Publications ==
The AMR has an annual bulletin which looks further into themes from past conference and from diverse articles on Rouen's heritage as well as giving accounts of meetings, actions and commissions' activities.

=== Les Cahiers des monuments rouennais ===
The AMR also publishes "Les Cahiers des monuments rouennais", a collection of thematic books on timber-framed houses, hôtels particuliers, monumental cemeteries and other topics.

- Nadine-Josette Chaline and Arlette Gaspérini, L'église Saint-Patrice de Rouen et ses vitraux, 1994, 48 pages.
- André Lefort, Rouen avant 1940, souvenir de pierres disparues, 1995, 168 pages.
- Jean-Pierre Chaline (ed.), Mémoire d'une ville : le Cimetière Monumental de Rouen, 1997, 128 pages.
- Jacques Petit, Défense et illustration des armoiries de Rouen, 1998, 48 pages.
- Jacques Petit, Au fil des rues : l'histoire rouennaise, 2001, 68 pages.
- Olivier Chaline, Les Hôtels particuliers de Rouen, 2002, 224 pages.
- Jean-Pierre Chaline (ed.), Demeures rouennaises du XIXe siècle, 2006, 220 pages.
- Jean-Pierre Chaline, Quand Rouen fêtait le millénaire normand, 2011, 68 pages.
- Jean-Pierre Chaline (ed.), Rouen, les maisons à pans de bois au fil des siècles et des rues, 2013, 236 pages.
- Jean-Pierre Chaline (ed.), Églises et chapelles de Rouen, un patrimoine à (re)découvrir, 2017, 252 pages.
