= Jules Adeline =

French art historian (1845–1909)

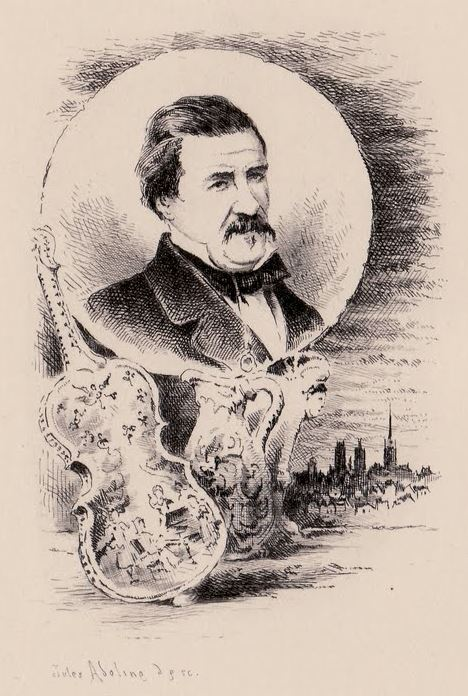
Jules Adeline; self-portrait from La légende du violon de faïence (1895)

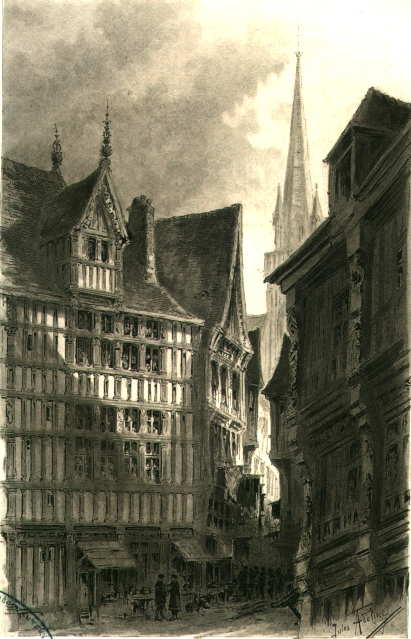
Illustration from Maisons Normandes (1888)

Jules Adeline (28 April 1845 in Rouen – 24 August 1909 in Rouen) was a French designer, engraver, illustrator, and historian. He produced over 9,000 images; largely devoted to Rouen and the surrounding areas.

== Life and work ==
His father, Louis Adeline, was a local artist. He attended the Lycée Pierre-Corneille. During the Franco-Prussian War, he was a Sous-lieutenant with the 2nd Battalion in Rouen. Shortly after the war, he began to produce designs and architectural projects, and created his first etching in 1872. Three of his pieces were chosen by the publisher, Alfred Cadart, for his album L'Illustration nouvelle.

In 1873, he designed a small monument, honoring the engraver, Louis-Henri Brévière, erected in Forges-les-Eaux. The bust was melted down during World War II. He also designed a monument to those who died during the Siege of Toul.

From 1873 to 1885, he regularly exhibited his engravings at the Salon, and was awarded a medal at the Centennial Exposition in Philadelphia.

He was a member of the Commission Départementale des Antiquités, the Commission Départementale d'Architecture, and the Commission of the École supérieure d'art et design Le Havre-Rouen. In 1880, he was elected a member of the Académie de Rouen; serving as its president in 1890. He was one of the founding members of the Société des Amis des Monuments Rouennais in 1886. He presented a reconstruction of Old Rouen at the Exposition Nationale et Coloniale of 1896. That same year, he was named a Knight in the Legion of Honor.

In addition to his fame as an engraver, he was a noted collector of Japanese dolls.
