= Mehmet Aksoy =

Mehmet Aksoy may refer to:

- Mehmet Aksoy (sculptor) (born 1939), Turkish sculptor
- Mehmet Aksoy (filmmaker) (1985–2017), British-Kurdish filmmaker
