= L'État, c'est moi =

Political catch phrase

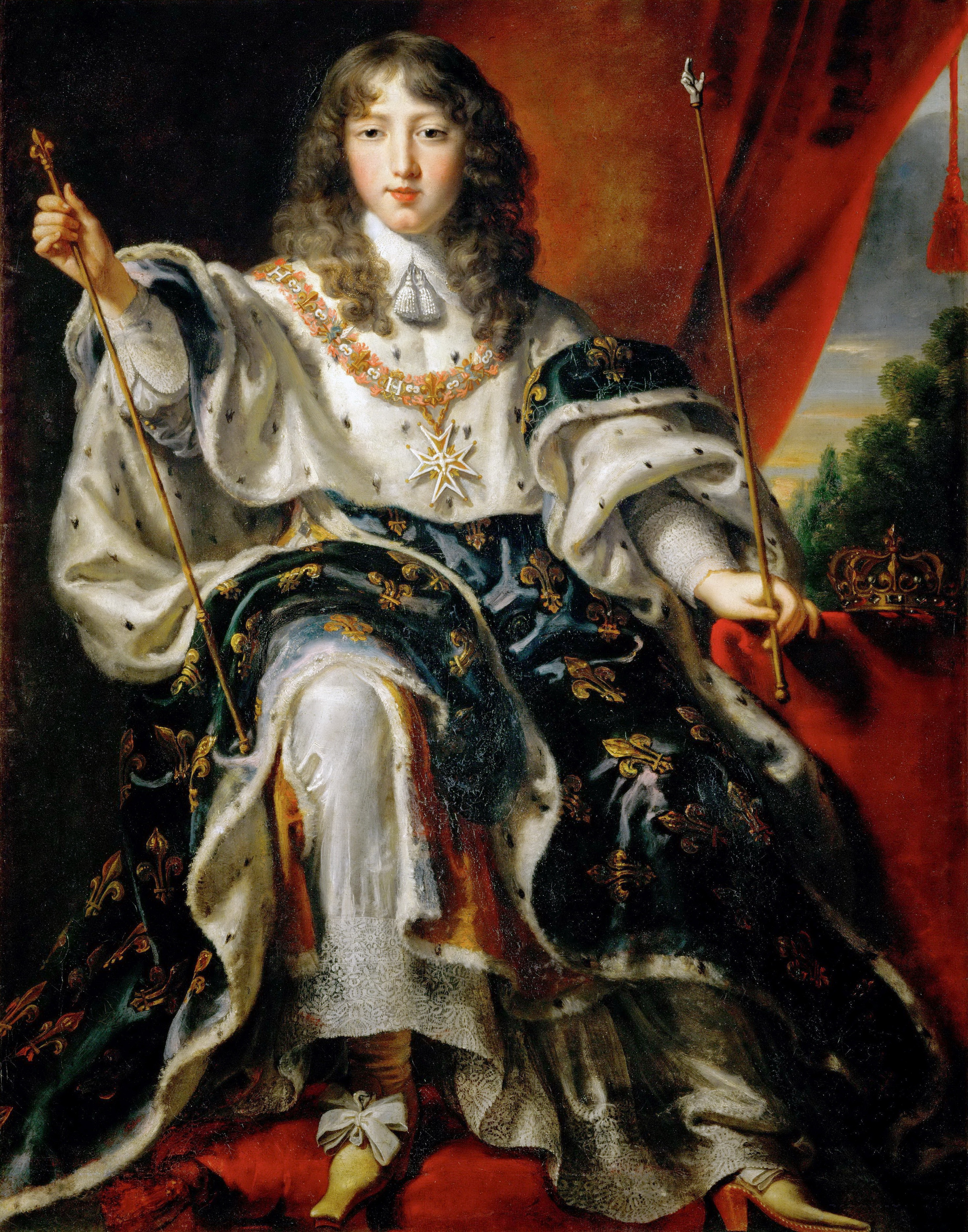
Louis XIV by Juste d'Egmont, 1654

L'État, c'est moi (English: "I am the state", lit. 'the state, it is I') is an apocryphal saying attributed to King Louis XIV. It was allegedly said on 13 April 1655 before the Parlement of Paris. It is supposed to assert the primacy of the royal authority in a context of defiance with the Parlement, which contests royal edicts taken in lit de justice on 20 March 1655. The phrase symbolizes absolute monarchy and absolutism.

== Historicity ==
Historians contest whether this sentence, which does not appear in the registers of the parliament, was really said by Louis XIV, especially since it is attested that, on his deathbed, he pronounced a seemingly contradictory statement: "I die, but the state will always remain."

The origin of the phrase is attributed to Pierre-Édouard Lémontey in his Essai sur l'établissement monarchique de Louis XIV et sur les altérations qu'il éprouva pendant la vie de ce prince ("Essay on the Monarchical Establishment of Louis XIV and on the Alterations It Experienced During the Life of that Prince") (1818), where he writes: "The Koran of France was contained in four syllables and Louis XIV pronounced them one day: 'L'État, c'est moi!'" As Olivier Chaline and Edmond Dziembowski point out, "if the forger is well forgotten today, his invention has not finished being used..."

== Bibliography ==
- Bély, Lucien (2005). Louis XIV : le plus grand roi du monde. Les classiques Gisserot de l'histoire (in French). Éditions Jean-paul Gisserot. p. 279. ISBN 287747772X. Bely2005.
