= László Mindszenti =

Hungarian painter (1934–2020)

- Born: 21 May 1934; Békéscsaba, Kingdom of Hungary
- Died: 9 December 2020 (aged 86)
- Occupation: Painter

László Mindszenti (21 May 1934 – 9 December 2020) was a Hungarian painter and poet who spent the majority of his life in France. He was an important figure in abstract art.

== Biography ==
After his secondary and university studies in Budapest, Mindszenti moved to France at the age of 22. In 1960, he enrolled in the École supérieure d'art et design Le Havre-Rouen. He earned a bachelor's degree at Sorbonne and a doctorate at the Institut d'Art et d'Archéologie in 1966. In 1974, he won the Grand Prix de Poésie Libre of the Syndicat des Journalistes et Écrivains. In 1972, he published Poèmes de jade, poème de jadis and Délire barbare in 1974.

In 1960, he began publicly exhibiting his art in nearly 80 galleries, museums, churches, and public places, including at the European Parliament in Brussels in 1988 and the Hungarian Institute in Paris in 2002.

László Mindszenti died on 11 December 2020 at the age of 86.

== Public Collections ==
- Musée National d'Art Moderne
- Musée Rapin
- Musée de Soulac-sur-Mer
- Conseil Général de Haute-Normandie
- Préfecture du Lot-et-Garonne
- Siège de la Fédération du Bâtiment du Lot-et-Garonne
- Maison de la Médecine du travail
- Groupe F. Codet
