= Société d'Émulation de Montbéliard =

Learned society in France

- Established: 1851; 175 years ago
- Purpose: Academic
- Location: Montbéliard, France
- Official language: French
- Website: Official website

The Société d'Émulation de Montbéliard is a société d'émulation in the former principality of Montbéliard. It was founded in 1851, with the aim of encouraging and propagating a taste for letters, sciences and the arts.
