= Louis-Henri Brévière =

French engraver (1797–1869)

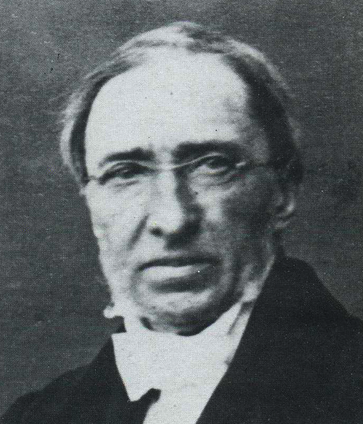
Louis-Henri Brévière (date unknown)

Louis-Henri Brévière (15 December 1797, in Forges-les-Eaux – 2 June 1869, in Hyères) was a French engraver. He became known for reviving wood-engraving using a burin; which had fallen into neglect since the seventeenth century.

== Biography ==
He studied at the École de Dessin in Rouen, directed by Marc-Antoine Descamps, the founder's son. From 1820 to 1830, he had a shop in Rouen. In 1823, he perfected a process for engraving the scrolls that were used for printing indiennes; a type of textile.

During this time, he became a member of the Société libre d'émulation de la Seine-Maritime, the Académie des sciences, belles-lettres et arts de Rouen, and the Commission départementale des Antiquités de la Seine-Maritime.

In 1834, he received a gold medal at the municipal exposition of fine arts and, in 1839, a large silver medal at the Salon in Paris. Shortly after. he was appointed Director of Engraving at the Imprimerie Nationale.

He purchased the Imprimerie Monton, in Les Andelys, in 1855. He retired to Rouen in 1863, where he wrote his memoirs, and died in Hyères, where he had gone to spend the winter.

A square in his hometown was nemd after him. In 1873, a small monument with a bust was erected there; designed by Jules Adeline and sculpted by Louis Auvray. The bust was melted down during World War II.

He created over 3,000 pieces, including illustrations for several titles in The Human Comedy by Balzac, Gulliver's Travels, by Jonathan Swift, and Robinson Crusoe by Daniel Defoe. In addition, he wrote De la xylographie, ou gravure sur bois (Of Xylography; or engraving on Wood, 1833).

The Gardens of the Château de Gaillon
