= Société d'émulation =

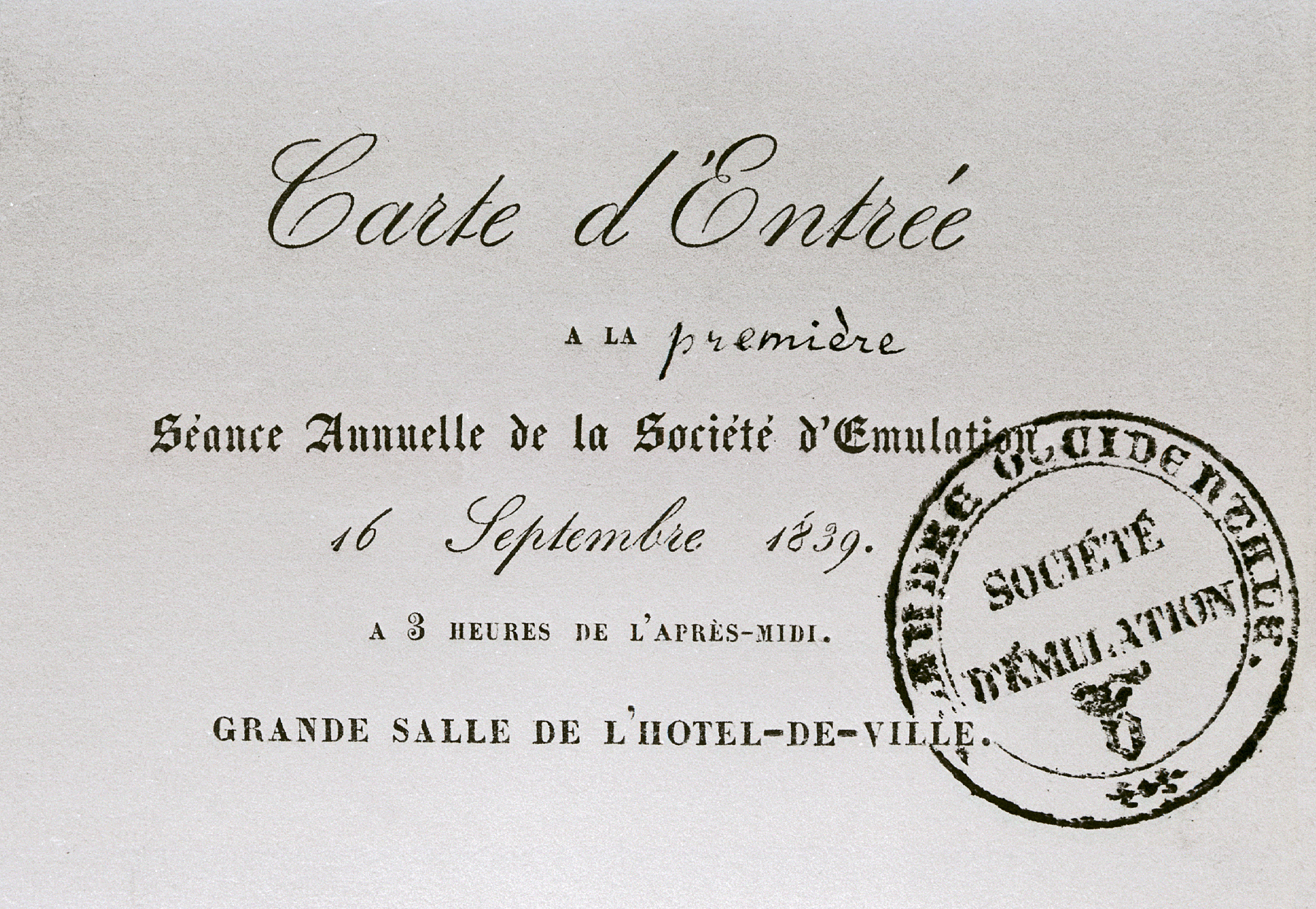
Admission ticket for the first annual meeting of the Bruges Historical Society (Société d'Emulation), 16 September 1839

Société d'émulation is a name given from the 18th century onwards to some learned societies of men in France, Wallonia and Flanders wishing to study together in the arts, science and letters and often to publish the results of their reflections and their works in a bulletin, review or Acts. They were also social and creative organisations formed of a province's cultural elites. The 19th century was the golden age of Sociétés d'émulation and some of them, with their social aspects and particular costumes, have survived up to the present day.

Mainly made up of amateurs and local notables, these societies preferred the less ambitious term 'Société d'émulation' to the more scholarly and official title of 'Académie', partly since 'Société d'émulation' indicated their attachment to more limited research within the borders of their society's region. Their ambitions were not as universal as the academies, but their publications and works remain a mine of documentary evidence and very rich accounts of subjects often neglected by the more scholarly academies.

== Bibliography ==
- Bibliographie des sociétés savantes de la France, Première partie, Paris, Impr. nat., 1878, 83 p.
- Jean-Pierre Chaline, Sociabilité et érudition des sociétés savantes en France, XIX^{e}-XX^{e} s., Paris, Éd. du CTHS, 1995, 270 p.
- P. Leuilliot, « Histoire locale et politique de l’histoire », Annales, Économies, Sociétés, Civilisations, 29^{e} année, 1974, p. 139-150.
- Les sociétés savantes et la recherche (journées d’études organisées par le C.T.H.S., 2004, Bulletin de liaison des sociétés savantes, mars 2005, no. 10 ; en particulier Martine François, « Le dynamisme des sociétés savantes pour la recherche » (p. 1-3), Jean-Pierre Chaline, « Les sociétés savantes : vulgarisation du savoir ou renouvellement scientifique ? » (p. 3-4) et Régis Bertrand, « Sociétés savantes et recherche historique aujourd'hui ». (p. 17-19).
