= Marcel Cartier =

American writer

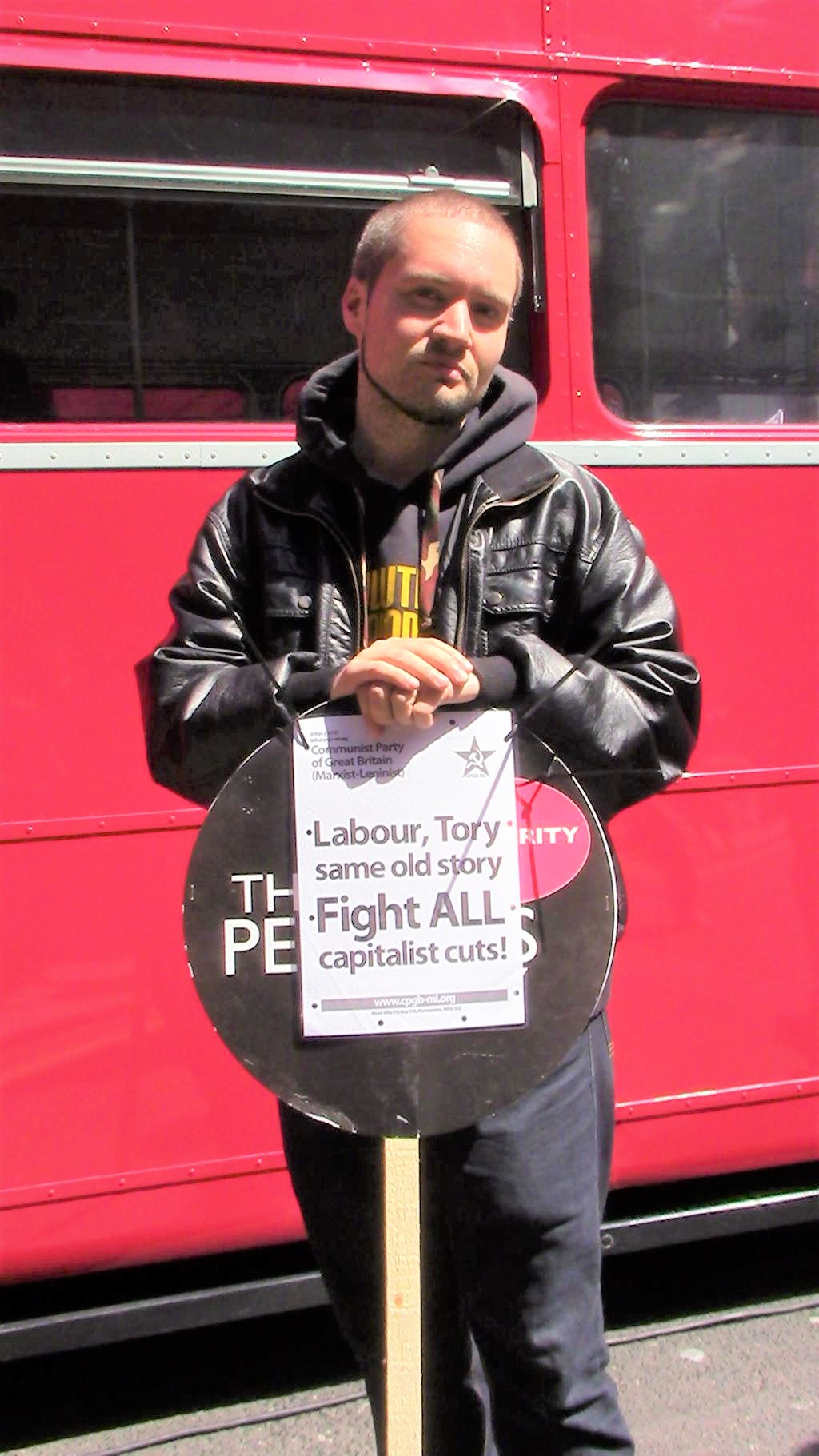
- Marcel Cartier at London's 2016 MayDay rally.

Background information
- Born: 4 October 1984 (age 42); Heidelberg, West Germany
- Genre: American hip hop
- Occupations: rapper, journalist, author, activist and songwriter
- Years active: 2007-present

Marcel Cartier is an American hip-hop artist, journalist, filmmaker, writer, and political commentator based in Germany. His music features themes such as anti-colonialism, socialism, feminism and imperialism. He has reported on Kurdish nationalism and recording the experiences of anti-ISIS fighters belonging to the YPG and YPJ militias during the Rojava–Islamist conflict. His first book Serkeftin became one of the first major accounts by an English-speaking journalist to gain access to the civil structures created by Kurdish militants in Rojava. In Spring 2017 he witnessed the Syrian civil war while travelling with an international delegation to Syrian Kurdistan, his journey facilitated by filmmaker Mehmet Aksoy who was killed by ISIS later that same year. While in Kurdistan he heavily interviewed and collected the experiences of anti-ISIS fighters belonging to the Women's Protection Units and People's Protection Units.

Currently, Cartier is a contributor to RedFish Media and has created 10 short documentaries with them since 2018.

== Early life ==
Marcel Cartier was born in Heidelberg, West Germany on October 4, 1984. His mother is Finnish and his father is American. Much of his childhood was spent on military bases across the globe, traveling with his father while he worked for the US military. In his teenage years, Cartier was introduced to the music of Dead Prez and KRS-One, both of which influenced his own music later into his adult life. Between 2002 and 2005 he was a member of the Communist Party USA and between 2009 and 2016 a member of the Party for Socialism and Liberation.

Cartier's music often focuses on themes of Anti-Colonialism, Feminism, racism, Palestinian statehood, and Labor rights. Artists he has collaborated with include Akala, Lowkey, and Immortal Technique. For his music's contribution to the Palestinian solidarity movement, he was awarded the honour of contributing to Lowkey's event 'Long Live Palestine' concert in 2011, organised by 'Sounds of Liberation' in Brooklyn, New York. Teaming up with the Palestinian solidarity group Existence is Resistance (EIR), he co-created the documentary Hip Hop is Bigger than the Occupation while taking part in an international delegation to Palestine alongside other hip-hop artists including Lowkey, Nana Dankwa, Mazzi, M1, and Dead Prez who happened to have been one of Cartier's teenage idols.

=== Journalism in Kurdistan ===
In Spring 2017 he witnessed the Syrian civil war while travelling with an international delegation to Syrian Kurdistan, his journey facilitated by filmmaker Mehmet Aksoy who was killed by ISIS later that same year. While in Kurdistan he heavily interviewed and collected the experiences of anti-ISIS fighters belonging to the Women's Protection Units and People's Protection Units. Describing the environment in Rojava as “a feeling, a spirit, the life and soul of a revolution”, he began centering much of his journalism and music around Kurdish issues. He recorded these experiences in his first book Serkeftin: A Narrative of the Rojava Revolution, published by Zero Books. The Morning Star gave a positive review, while Publishers Weekly gave a mixed review describing the book as a "valuable and revealing account of the nascent institutions of Syria’s Kurdish warriors" but criticised it for its overuse of "uneven, utilitarian prose" and described him as having a "rose-coloured" outlook. Cartier later expanded his ideas on Kurdish nationalism within his second book, a self-published collection of essays that were originally published by TheRegion and titled Berxwedan: Writings on the Kurdish Freedom Movement. He was the U.S. West Asia Policy editor for TheRegion.org before the project's closure after the death of its lead editor.

== Works ==
=== Documentaries ===
- Exarchia: Resisting Gentrification
- Oury Jalloh: Death in Cell #5
- Not In Our Hood: How People's Power Beat Amazon, Part 1 & 2
- Humanitarian Crisis In Hollywood
- Battleground France: Who is Behind The Yellow Vests?
- Freeing Santa's Slave
- The New Battle For Nicaragua
- Romaphobia: The Invisible Racism
- War for Export: Germany’s Bloody Secret
- The Forgotten Colony: Puerto Rico
- Nazis & Nationalists: The Rise of Greece’s Far-Right
- Hip Hop is Bigger than the Occupation (Co-creator, directed by Nana Dankwa, 2011)

=== Studio albums and Mixtapes ===
- A World To Win (with Agent Of Change) (2020)
- Act X: War On The Palaces (2019)
- Revolutionary Minded Vol. 5 (2018)
- Red Flag Revival (with Agent Of Change) (2017)
- Invent The Future (with Agent Of Change) (2015)
- United States of Hypocrisy (Prequel mixtape for the 'Invent The Future' album) (2015)
- Revolutionary Minded 4 (2014)
- History Will Absolve Us (with Agent Of Change) (2012)
- Revolutionary Minded Vol. 3 (2011)
- Revolutionary Minded 2 (Hosted by K-Salaam) (2009)
- Revolutionary Minded Vol. 1 (Hosted by DJ Vlad) (2007)
