= Siege of Toul =

Coordinates: 48.6750°N 5.8917°E

- Part of the Franco-Prussian War
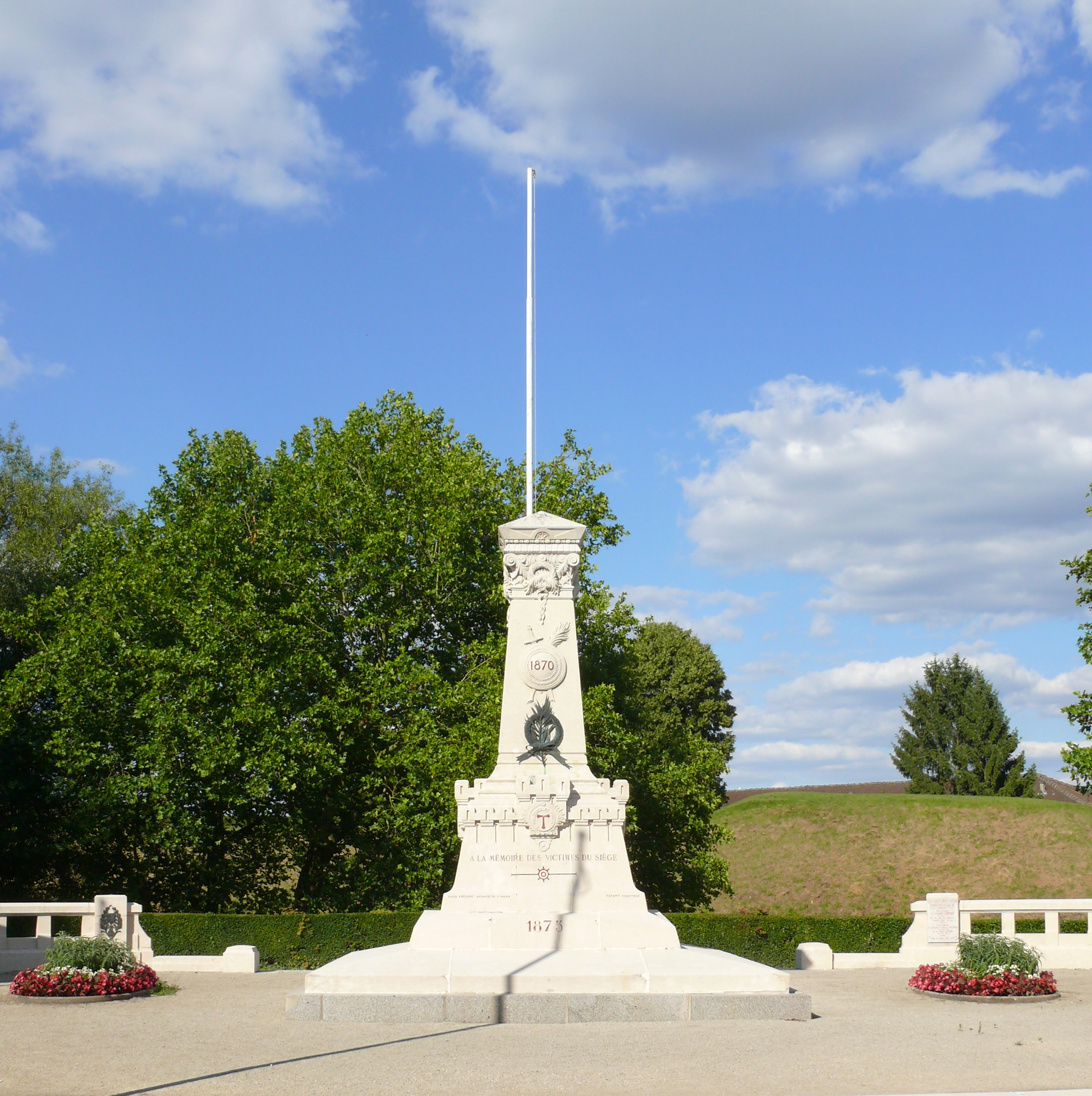
- Monuments aux morts in Toul for the dead of the 1870 conflict. French monument, designed by Jules Adeline, inaugurated in 1875.
Date	16 August – 23 September 1870 (1 month and 1 week)
Location	Toul, France
Result	German victory

Belligerents
(German Empire) North German Confederation: Prussia; Bavaria; Württemberg	(Second French Empire) French Empire (French Third Republic) French Republic

Commanders and leaders
(Kingdom of Prussia) Frederick Francis II (Kingdom of Prussia) Gustav von Alvensleben	Major Huck

Strength
up to 13,000 soldiers 104 guns and howitzers	2,375 men 71 fortress guns

Casualties and losses
232 men 54 killed or died of wounds 169 wounded 9 missing 15 horses	2,375 men 26 killed 88 wounded 2,349 captured 8 civilians killed 20 civilians wounded 71 fortress guns captured 3 barracks destroyed Stores and supplies captured

The siege of Toul was the siege of the fortified French town of Toul from 16 August to 23 September 1870 by Prussian, Bavarian and Württemberg forces during the Franco-Prussian War. Toul controlled a railway line leading to Germany and it was vital for the Germans to secure it to resupply and reinforce their armies in northern France.

An attempt to seize the fortress on 16 August failed with heavy losses for the Germans. After a blockade of 37 days, the German siege artillery opened fire with 62 guns and howitzers at 0530 on 23 September and the fortress surrendered at 15:30. The Germans captured 2,349 French soldiers and 71 fortress guns along with considerable stores of supplies and pushed the German railway terminus in France closer to the German forces besieging Paris.

== Background ==
During the German campaign in northern France in 1870, and especially after German armies began to advance on Paris to besiege it, it was critical for the German High Command to secure Toul, which controlled a railway line to Germany. Toul, located in a valley between the Marne–Rhine Canal and the Moselle, was protected by nine bastions, some outworks, water-filled ditches, including a 40 feet (12 m)-wide main ditch and a system of sluices to inundate the nearby ground. The 125-meter-high Mont St.Michel to the north, the Dommartin-lès-Toul heights to the east, the Choloy plateau to the south-west and the absence of bomb-proof cover rendered the fortification vulnerable to artillery bombardment and the hills and villages nearby made it easy for hostile infantry to advance to its ramparts.

== Prelude ==
On 14 August, Captain von Trotha's squadron from the 2nd Dragoons of the Guard attacked some chasseurs à cheval near Toul. A melee commenced and the French were driven into the suburbs. They received no fire support from the fortress. Trotha took this as evidence of a weak garrison and sent an officer to the fortress, demanding its surrender. The French commandant, Major Huck, simply told the Germans to go back and the French began shooting at the Germans from the houses and gardens nearby. The German cavalry broke their way out and destroyed the sluices controlling the water in the ditches.

Another demand for surrender came on 15 August, this time from Captain von Rosen of the 2nd squadron, 3rd Lancers of the Guard, whose men had advanced on the fortress under fire, though they suffered no losses. The commandant turned down the demand as before, and the Germans returned to Ménil-la-Tour in the afternoon.

== Coup de Main ==
General of the Infantry Gustav von Alvensleben, commander of IV Corps, encouraged by Toul's weak resistance to these advance groups, decided on the early morning of 16 August to reconnoiter the fort and seize it by means of a coup de main. French inhabitants told the Germans that Toul had only 1,000 or 1,200 Garde Mobile as garrison. IV Corps' advance guard, consisting of the reinforced 14th Infantry Brigade, which included the 27th and 93rd Infantry Regiments, the 7th Dragoons, the 1st heavy and 2nd light batteries, two pioneer companies and the light bridge train and which was commanded by General von Zychlinski, received Alvensleben's order and deployed at Francheville at 1100, where the 2nd heavy battery had also been concentrated.

The two heavy batteries advanced on the fort and opened fire at the ramparts at 1,500 meters, the first battery from the east and the second from Mont St. Michel to the north. Two guns from the light battery augmented the St. Michel position, with the remaining four guns of the battery in reserve. Dismounted dragoons and 2nd Battalion, 93rd Regiment escorted the batteries. The bombardment was ineffective and the French replied with six guns well-concealed by trees. Alvensleben arrived in person and ordered the town to bombardment to induce a surrender.

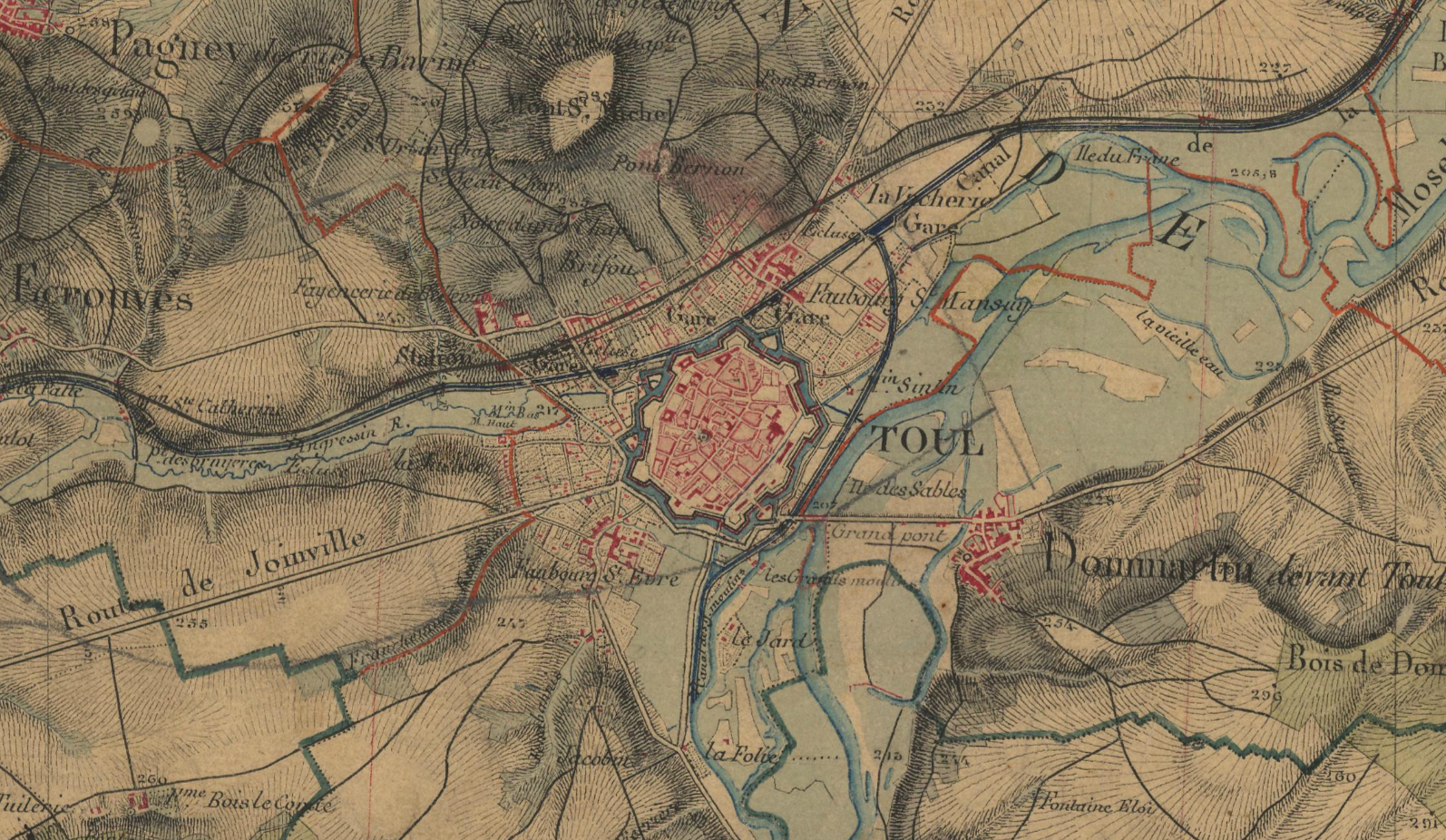
Map of Toul and the surrounding area in 1866

At 1245, Zychlinski led the infantry column on an assault at the fortress. The 3rd pioneer company led the attack to reconnoiter the ditches. Skirmishers would follow and surround the fort, the ditch would be passed and an entrance gained through the north gate of the fortress. The pioneers reached the north side of the fortress under long-range rifle fire. The Germans found the northern glacis unfavorable to an assault and began to search for an eastern passage. After a gaining a position on the eastern side, they opened fire on the garrison. At 1300, the 93rd Regiment's fusilier battalion advanced in skirmishing order against the northern face and reached the main ditch, opening fire on the garrison deployed at the north gate ravelin. The 2nd Battalion of the 93rd Regiment advanced against the north-western side and engaged in a firefight in a skirmish line against the garrison. The drawbridge had been raised and no suitable location for an assault was found. The 2nd Battalion, 27th Regiment moved against the western side, crossing open ground and suffering heavy losses in the process, including the injuring of the battalion's commander Major Joffroy. They reached the foot of the glacis and received reinforcements from the 1st Battalion, which also suffered casualties, with the battalion commander Lieutenant-Colonel Werner wounded. The Bavarian lancer brigade reached the scene and opened fire with its horse artillery batteries on the fort.

With the fortress immune to the fire of skirmishers and a few batteries of artillery, the only means to take it was to gain a passage over the main ditch and storm it. At 1400, a German heavy gun fired eight rounds from a range of 80 meters at the gate near the St. Mansuy suburb to destroy it and bring down the drawbridge. The powder-smoke and large number of trees made aiming impossible and the attempt was discontinued. Between 1500 and 1600, Alvensleben ordered the coup de main to be abandoned. The Germans retreated in small groups to minimize casualties, though the French artillery fired on them with effect. The 2nd Battalion in the west did not get the order until 1900, having maintained a fire up until that moment and suffering serious casualties. It then withdrew north with few losses, as the French passively contented themselves with staying in the fort and launched no sorties. On arriving at his headquarters, Alvensleben received an order from Second Army commander to attempt a coup de main on Toul but decided that a second assault would be pointless and would tie down his troops in an extended siege and reported his thoughts to Second Army headquarters. IV Corps continued its march to the west.

== Siege ==
The French commandant, Major Huck, controlled 2,375 men and 71 fortress guns. By early September, the German besiegers had Etappen troops from III Prussian Army, the 4th and 6th fortress artillery companies and captured French guns from Marsal with which to bombard Toul.

The weather and unfavorable ground delayed the German preparations but by the night of 9–10 September they had deployed three artillery batteries on the Côte Barine slope with German infantry providing cover from the nearby railway embankment. After informing Major Huck of their intent, the German batteries opened fire at 0700 but only burned some houses in the town and received heavy French counter-battery fire. The French artillery continued firing on 11 September and the newly-arrived German commander, Frederick Francis II, Grand Duke of Mecklenburg-Schwerin, discontinued his own bombardment. Frederick Francis had been detached to Toul from the Siege of Metz with the 17th Infantry Division, the 17th Cavalry Brigade, three batteries from the 2nd Landwehr Division. The German formations arrived near Toul on 12 and 13 September. The previously engaged German siege forces were redeployed to cover the German supply lines at St. Dizier. German cavalry at Ochey prevented French forces on the Langres plateau from interfering with the siege.

The 34th Brigade was deployed on the Choloy plateau, the 33rd on both banks of the Marne–Rhine Canal and the Germans set to work closing in on the glacis from the north. French fire could not stop the German outpost groups, which suffered only 13 casualties. A reconnaissance on 12 September convinced Frederick Francis to begin bombarding the fortress to submission from the south-west. He went off on 13 September to meet King Wilhelm I at Château-Thierry to receive more instructions.

On the morning of 15 September, the 2nd Landwehr Division's heavy battery at Mont St. Michel, firing from positions prepared the previous night, harassed for hours the French troops inside Toul and watchposts in the Toul Cathedral tower. The 5th and 6th heavy batteries of the 17th Infantry Division were deployed into pre-prepared positions on Mont St. Michel on 16 September to subdue the French fortress artillery, which had maintained its own fire. Three companies of Prussian heavy artillery with 26 heavy guns and their ammunition arrived by railway from Nancy on 17 and 18 September at St. Robert. Carriages transported the guns to the artillery parks on the Choloy plateau and on the Côte Marine, while their emplacements were being constructed by infantry from Ecrouves. Simultaneously, 42 field guns pounded the fortress on 18 September to distract the French from the transport operation.

Colonel Bartsch, commander of the siege artillery, and Major Schumann, the senior engineer officer, planned the direction of the attack. Twelve siege batteries would be used and trenches dug, if necessary. The siege batteries on Mont St. Michel would fire on bastions no. 3 and 4, while fire from La Justice would make a breach on the masonry to the right of bastion no. 4. German pioneers erected a bridge over the river at Pierre la Treiche on 20 September, while a detachment of Bavarian engineers destroyed a canal lock near the suburb of St. Mansuy. A German attempt to drain the ditch of the fortress by diverting the Vauban canal's water to the Moselle succeeded only partially.

=== Franc-tireur ===
French franc-tireur bands harassed the lines of communications of the German siege forces surrounding Paris. The French garrison at Toul was so weak that the Germans could send the 33rd Infantry Brigade, the 11th Lancers and three batteries to Châlons on 19 September to secure the lines of communications alongside other German forces.

=== Final bombardment and capitulation ===
The Prussian siege artillery, with the help of five infantry companies, constructed emplacements for its pieces on the evening of 22 September. To cover the preparations, a rifle company occupied St. Evre on the night of 21–22 September and heavy guns and three field batteries bombarded the town throughout the day from Mont St. Michel. At 0530 on 23 September, 11 siege batteries with 62 guns and howitzers opened fire, while Frederick Francis watched the proceeding from the Côte Barine. The German firepower burned down French barracks' and magazines near the fortifications. After an initially lackluster response, the French artillery and infantry set on fire the suburbs of St. Evre and St. Mansuy, but otherwise accomplished little.

At 1530 the French raised the white flag over the cathedral. Major Huck sent a letter to the Germans, declaring his readiness to surrender the fort. The garrison was taken prisoner of war and sent to a bivouac on the Choloy road and the German 3rd Battalion, 90th Regiment and two rifle companies occupied the town in the evening. The Grand Duke entered the next morning at the head of the troops.

== Aftermath ==
The 2nd Battalion, 90th Regiment, remained as garrison while the Prussian siege artillery was sent to bombard Soissons. The French guns captured at Marsal and Toul were now available for operations against Verdun. The German railway terminus was pushed to the west by the fall of Toul and by the German victory at the Siege of Strasbourg on 28 September. The Germans expended 5,034 artillery shells, shrapnel and bombs during the siege on 16 and 23 August and from 10 to 23 September.

=== Casualties ===
The French lost 1 officer and 25 men killed, 8 officers and 80 men wounded, 109 officers and 2,240 men captured as well as 8 civilians killed and 20 wounded. Three standards of the 3rd dragoons and the eagle of a Garde Mobile regiment were captured. Three barracks and some private buildings were destroyed by the German bombardment but overall damage to the town was minimal. French material losses were enormous, with 71 fortress guns, 30,000 stands of arms, 2,800 sabres, 224,000 lb (102 t) of gunpowder, 143,000 rations of food and 50,000 rations of corn captured by the Germans.

German casualties during the expedition to Toul on 16 August amounted to 6 officers and 41 enlisted men killed or died of wounds, 11 officers, 1 assistant surgeon and 129 men wounded and 9 men missing. Five horses were killed and nine wounded. Losses from 27 August to 23 September were minimal, with 7 enlisted men killed or dead of wounds, 1 officer and 27 men wounded and 1 horse wounded.
