= François Depeaux =

French industrialist and art collector (1853–1920)

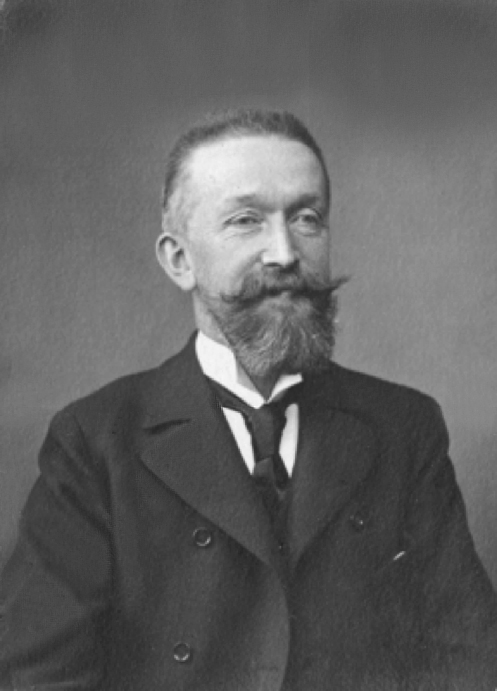
François Depeaux

François Depeaux (13 July 1853 - 11 October 1920) was a French industrialist, art collector and patron. He was one of the defenders of the Rouen School.

== Life ==
He was born in Bois-Guillaume. He bought a coal mine near Swansea in Wales and developed the coal industry. In 1886 he was one of the founder members of the Société des Amis des Monuments Rouennais.

Between 1880 and 1920 he acquired almost 600 paintings. Following his divorce, part of his collection was split up in 1901 at the hôtel Drouot and in 1906 through a sale for judicial reasons at the Georges Petit gallery. In 1903 he offered 300 paintings to the Musée des beaux-arts de Rouen. In 1909 the curator accepted a gift of 53 impressionist and post-impressionist paintings.

He died at Mesnil-Esnard and on his death his remaining collection was split up at three public sales. His coal business was inherited by his son Edmond Depeaux, who was denounced by the Kommandantur during the German occupation of France in the 1940s, sentenced to death for storing arms and shot on 4 November 1941.

On 20 October 2012 a François-Depeaux wing was opened on the site of the Château du Vracq (one of Depeaux's properties) at La Bouille (Seine-Maritime).

== Works ==
- Remarques sur les projets de voirie dans le quartier du Mont-Riboudet, Rouen, Lecerf, 1901, 51 p. (OCLC 457662262)
- Remarques sur le projet de loi pour la vente et la répartition des charbons en France, 1915, 4 p. (OCLC 459179735)
- Importation des houilles étrangères en France, Rouen, Lecerf, 1915, 51 p. (OCLC 493966068)
- Flotte charbonnière française. Transports par chalands de mer, 1917, 24 p. (OCLC 459179716)
- Projet de loi pour le développement de la marine marchande, Rouen, Lecerf, 4 p. (OCLC 459179731)

== Bibliography ==
- François Lespinasse (preface by Laurent Salomé), François Depeaux (1853-1920) : Portrait d'un collectionneur d'impressionnistes, Rouen, 2016, 316 p. (ISBN 978-2-906130-94-4)
- Marc-Henri Tellier, François Depeaux : Le charbonnier et les impressionnistes, Rouen, 2010, 304 p., 24 cm × 32 cm, relié (ISBN 978-2-7466-0515-2, OCLC 651049214)
- Le 11 décembre 2010, l'Académie des sciences, belles-lettres et arts de Rouen a décerné à l'auteur le prix Gossier 2010 pour cet ouvrage.
- Marc-Henri Tellier, François Depeaux (1853-1920), collectionneur et mécène d'artistes de son temps, mémoire de maîtrise d'histoire de l'art, Université Paris I Panthéon-Sorbonne, sous la dir. de M. le Professeur Éric Darragon, septembre 2005
- François Bergot, « La donation François Depeaux au musée des Beaux-Arts de Rouen », in Hommage à Hubert Landais, Blanchard Éditeur, 1987, p. 205-211
- François Lespinasse (preface by François Bergot), L'École de Rouen, Sotteville-lès-Rouen, Rouen-Offset, 1980, 221 p. (OCLC 18496892, LCCN 80155566), p. 10-11
- Laurent Salomé (ed.), Une ville pour l'impressionnisme : Monet, Pissarro et Gauguin à Rouen, Skira Flammarion, 2010, 396 p. (ISBN 9782081241923), « François Depeaux, une grande collection rouennaise », p. 124-165
