= Lucien Lefort =

French architect

Frédéric Lucien Didier Lefort
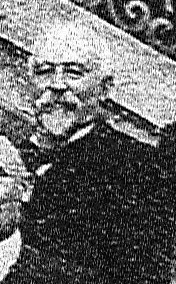
- Born: January 6, 1850; Sens, France
- Died: April 8, 1916 (aged 66); Rouen, France
- Occupation: Architect

Frédéric Lucien Didier Lefort (January 6, 1850, in Sens – April 8, 1916, in Rouen, France) was a French architect.

== Biography ==
Frédéric Lucien Didier Lefort was born on January 6, 1850, in Sens, Yonne, France, to Louis Lefort, an architect, and Rosalie Lucile Louise Montégu.

In 1873, he entered the École des Beaux-Arts in Paris. On January 1, 1877, he was appointed assistant architect in the service of Louis Desmarest, the architect of the Seine-Inférieure department. He later became the chief architect of Seine-Inférieure. He was elected a member of the Académie des sciences, belles-lettres et arts de Rouen in 1884. In 1886, he was one of the founding members of the society of the Amis des monuments rouennais.

He resided in Rouen and was the son-in-law of the architect Juste Lisch.

== Honors ==
- 1885: First class medal at the Salon des Artistes Français
- 1889: Double gold medal at the 1889 Exposition Universelle
- 1889: Knight of the Legion of Honour (decree of 29 October 1889)

== Works ==
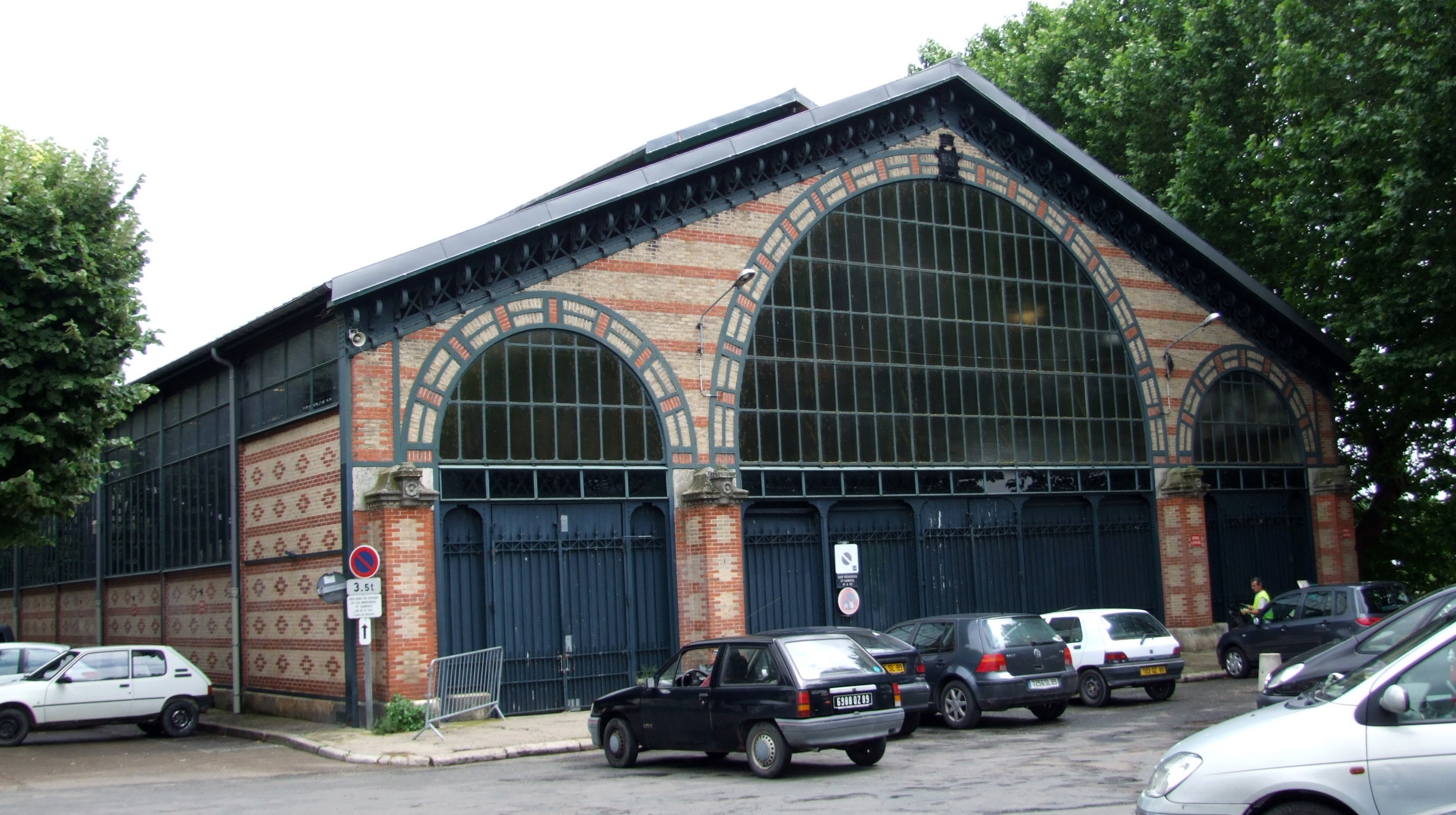
Covered market in Joigny.

- Basilica of the Sacred Heart of Rouen
- West wing of the Rouen Courthouse
- Tide gauges of the Grand Port Maritime of Rouen
- Sacristy and presbytery of the Saint-Maclou Church, Rouen
- Porch of the Church of Saint-Maclou, Rouen
- Manoir de Saint-Yon, Rouen (1881)
- Municipal theater of Sens (1882)
- Normal School for Female Teachers, Rouen
- Archives of Seine-Inférieure, Rouen (1892) (destroyed)
- Restoration of the Saint-Laurent Church, Rouen
- Schools in Saint-Saëns, Sahurs, Bosc-Roger-sur-Buchy, Longuerue
- Dieppe
- Restoration of the Saint-Jacques Church, Dieppe and the Saint-Rémy Church, Dieppe
- Castle in Saint-Pierre-de-Varengeville, around 1898.
- Castle in Bosnormand (Eure), around 1908.
- Restoration of the Saint-Ouen Church in Darnétal, and the churches in Moulineaux, Saint-Valery-en-Caux, Veulettes-sur-Mer
- Restoration of the Château de Robert le Diable in Moulineaux
- Covered market in Joigny
