= Daniel Moulinet =

French priest and historian

Daniel Moulinet (born 9 January 1957) is a French priest and historian, professor of contemporary history at the Catholic University of Lyon.

== Works ==
- Les Classiques païens dans les collèges catholiques ? Le combat de Mgr Gaume, (Histoire religieuse de la France, 6), Paris, Le Cerf, 1995, 485 p.
- Sources et méthodes en histoire religieuse, Lyon, Profac, 2000, 192 p.
- Béatifiés de l’an 2000. Pie IX, Jean XXIII, Guillaume-Joseph Chaminade, Dom Columba Marmion, Tommaso Reggio, Paris, Éditions Salvator, 2000, 204 p.
- Guide bibliographique des sciences religieuses, Paris, Salvator, 2000, 488 p.
- Le Concile Vatican II, (Tout simplement, 34), Paris, Éditions de l’Atelier, 2002, 192 p.
- La Séparation des Églises et de l’État en Bourbonnais, Yzeure, Amis du Patrimoine Religieux en Bourbonnais, 2004, 283 p.
- Genèse de la laïcité. À travers les textes fondamentaux de 1801 à 1959 (Droit civil ecclésiastique), Paris, Éditions du Cerf, 2005, 303 p.
- Laïcat catholique et société française. Les Comités catholiques (1870-1905) (« Histoire religieuse de la France », 33), Paris, Le Cerf, 2008, 592 p.
- Au cœur du monde. Henri Chaumont, un prêtre dans l’Esprit de Jésus, Éd. Beaurepaire – Société Saint-François-de-Sales, 2010, 292 p.
- Vatican II raconté à ceux qui ne l’ont pas vécu, Paris, Éditions de l’Atelier, 2012, 111 p.
- L’Église catholique à Montluçon au XXe siècle, Yzeure, APRB, 2012, 478 p.
- Prêtres soldats dans la Grande Guerre. Les clercs bourbonnais sous les drapeaux, Rennes, Presses universitaires de Rennes, 2014, 336 p. ill.
- Université catholique de Lyon. Entre passé et avenir, Toulouse, Privat, 2015, 160 p. ill.
- L’Église, la guerre et la paix, Paris, Le Cerf, 2016, 265 p.

in collaboration

- Nadine-Josette Chaline, Gardiens de la mémoire. Les monuments aux morts de la Grande Guerre dans l’Allier, Yzeure, Amis du Patrimoine religieux en Bourbonnais, 2008, 328 p.
- Direction de : Vitraux du XIXe siècle en Bourbonnais-Auvergne, Yzeure, Amis du Patrimoine religieux en Bourbonnais, 1992, 145 p.
- Direction de : L’Histoire en christianisme. Hommage à Jean Comby, Lyon, Profac, 2002, 116 p.
- Direction de : La Séparation de 1905 : les hommes et les lieux, Paris, Éd. de l’Atelier, 2005, 274 p.
- Direction de : Théologie et politique. Cent ans après la loi de 1905, Lyon, Profac, 2007, 326p.
- Codirection de : Le Diaconat permanent. Relectures et perspectives (« Théologies »), Paris, Le Cerf, 2007, 375 p.
- Codirection de : Jubilé et culte marial (Moyen Âge – Époque contemporaine), Publications de l’université de Saint-Étienne, 2009,

As publisher

- Édition de Paul Pelletier, Pierre Simon de Dreux-Brézé, évêque de Moulins (1850–1893), Charroux, Éditions des Cahiers Bourbonnais, 1994, 482 p.
- Edition (en collaboration avec Jean-Noël Dumont) de Charles de Montalembert, L’Église libre dans l’État libre, précédé des Intérêts catholiques au XIXe siècle (La nuit surveillée), Paris, Le Cerf, 2010, 475 p.
- Adaptation française de Manfred Heim, Les dates-clés de l’histoire de l’Église, Paris, Salvator, 2007, 352 p.
- Édition de Michel Cancouët, L’Afrique au Concile. Journal d’un expert, Rennes, Presses universitaires de Rennes, 2013, 240 p.

Last articles

- « Bilan historiographique sur la séparation des Églises et de l’État en France », dans L’État sans confession. La laïcité à Genève (1907) et dans les contextes suisse et français (Michel Grandjean et Sarah Scholl dir.), (« Histoire et société », 51), Genève, Labor et Fides, 2010, p. 139-170.
- « Réactions catholiques face aux tentatives d’union des Églises au début du XX^{e} siècle », La Conférence missionnaire mondiale Édimbourg 1910. Histoire et missions chrétiennes, n° 13, mars 2010, p. 137-154.
- « Le groupe Chevalier et les réseaux lyonnais », dans Humanisme et philosophie citoyenne. Joseph Vialatoux et Jean Lacroix (Emmanuel Gabellieri et Paul Moreau dir.), Paris, DDB – Lethielleux, 2010, p. 181-202.
- Notices “Bougon”, “Gonon”, “Jacquin”, “Penon”, “Quelen”, Dictionnaire des évêques de France au XX^{e} siècle, (Dominique-Marie Dauzet et Frédéric Le Moigne dir.), Paris, Le Cerf, 2010, p. 94-95, 305-306, 354-355, 518, 551-552.
- « L’engagement des laïcs catholiques au XIX^{e} siècle », dans Les Laïcs en mission ecclésiale, Esprit et vie, hors série n° 2, novembre 2010, p. 19-36.
- « Jean-Marie Vianney, figure de prêtre, et sa réception dans l’histoire », Théophilyon, 2010, XV-2, p. 421-450.
- « Notices : "Montaignac (Louise de)", "Noaillat (Marthe de", "Raffin (Louise de)", "Tamisier (Émilie)" », dans : Anne Cova et Bruno Dumons dir., Destins de femmes. Religion, culture et société France XIXe-XXe siècles, (Mémoire chrétienne au présent), Paris, Letouzey et Ané, 2010, p. 290-292, 301-302, 339-340, 413-415.
- « Débats autour du culte des images en Église », Lignes de crêtes, n°10, (2010), p. 18-19.
- « El santo cura de Ars como figura de sacerdote y su recepción en la historia », dans : Gabina Uribarri Bilbao dir., El Ser sacerdotal. Fundamentos y dimensiones constitutivas, (Publicaciones de la Universidad pontificia Comillas, Teología, 02), Madrid, San Pablo – Universidad pontificia Comillas, 2010, p. 265-283.
- « Lacordaire : un catholique libéral », Lumière et vie, tome LX-1, p. 57-66.
- « Le curé d’Ars et la Vierge Marie », María en los caminos de santidad cristiana. Ephemerides mariologicae, LXI-1, (January–March 2011), p. 33-46.
- « Regard rétrospectif sur l’apostolat des laïcs en France », Esprit et vie, n°237, juillet 2011, p. 13-22, n°238, août 2011, p. 10-20.
- « Le diocèse de Lyon et la loi de Séparation 1905 », La Grâce d’une cathédrale. Lyon primatiale des Gaules, (Philippe Barbarin dir.), Strasbourg, La Nuée bleue, 2011, p. 443-449.
- « Émile Amagat (1841–1915) », Revue de l’Université catholique de Lyon, n°20, 2011, p. 87-90.
- « Autour de Charles de Montalembert : un parti catholique ? », Les catholiques et la démocratie, (Jean-Noël Dumont dir.), Lyon, Le collège supérieur, 2012, p. 29-51.
- « Réflexions sur l’herméneutique de Vatican II », La Documentation catholique, n°2483, 5 February 2012, p. 145-148.
- « Les Comités catholiques. Pour la restauration d’une monarchie chrétienne en France ? », “Blancs” et contre-révolutionnaires en Europe. Espaces, réseaux, cultures et mémoires (fin XVIII^{e} – début XX^{e} siècles) (Bruno Dumons et Hilaire Multon dir.), (« Collection de l’École française de Rome »), Rome, École française, 2011, p. 295-305.
- « Charles de Montalembert et Louis Veuillot », Charles de Montalembert et ses contemporains, (Jean-Noël Dumont dir.), (La nuit surveillée), Paris, Le Cerf, 2012, p. 67-84.
- “Regard sur l’histoire de l’Église catholique à Montluçon au XX^{e} siècle”, Bulletin des Amis de Montluçon, n° 63 (2012), p. 7-28.
- “Le synode des évêques sur les laïcs de 1987”, Théophilyon, XVII-1, 2012, p. 153-171.
- “L’Université catholique de Lyon des origines au milieu du XX^{e} siècle”, Les universités et instituts catholiques. Regards sur leur histoire (1870-1950), (Guy Bedouelle et Olivier Landron dir.), Paris, Parole et Silence, 2012, p. 35-50.
- “Vatican II et les signes des temps”, Spiritus, 208, septembre 2012, p. 263-270; trad. espagnole, Spiritus. Edicion hispanoamericana, 208, septembre 2012, p. 97-103.
- “Mgr Odon Thibaudier (1823-1892)”, Revue de l’Université catholique de Lyon, n° 22, 2012, p. 71-73.
- “La liberté religieuse comme refus de domination”, Lignes de crêtes, n°17, octobre-décembre 2012, p. 19-20.
- “Sources et élaboration de l’histoire du concile Vatican II”, Archives de l’Église de France, n°78, 2nd semester 2012, p. 27-29.
- “Un concile, pour quoi faire ?”, Vatican II, un concile pour le monde, Monaco, Archevêché de Monaco, 2013, p. 15-31.
- L’usage de la notion de ‘signes des temps’ au concile Vatican II”, Signes des temps, traces de Dieu. Théophilyon, tome XVIII, vol. 1, 2013, p. 27-44.
- “Notes pour servir à l’histoire des églises de Neuilly-le-Réal, Saint-Pourçain-sur-Besbre et Vaumas, visitées lors de l’excursion du mois de juin 2013”, Nos églises bourbonnaises, n° 26 (2013), p. 25-90.
- “Les Comités catholiques et l’apprentissage de la modération (1870-1905)”, Les « chrétiens modérés » en France et en Europe, 1870-1960, (Jacques Prévotat et Jean Vavasseur-Desperriers dir.), Villeneuve d’Ascq, Presses universitaires du Septentrion, 2013, p. 179-193.
- “Le concile Vatican II dans la province d’Auvergne”, Actes des journées Anniversaire Vatican II, Clermont-Ferrand, ITA, 2013, p. 19-32.
- “Montalembert et le défi du choix de la liberté”, Montalembert pensatore europeo, (Manuel Ceretta et Mario Tesini dir.), Roma, Ed. Studium, 2013, p. 289-306.
- “La résistance spirituelle à la lecture des Cahiers du témoignage chrétien”, Résistance de l’esprit – esprit de Résistance. Échos saléviens, n° 21, Annecy, La Salévienne, 2014, p. 95-103.
- “Emmanuel Mounier à la prison Saint-Paul de Lyon”, Revue de l’Université catholique de Lyon, n° 25, juin 2014, p. 9-16.
- “Pascal Thomas. Des laïcs acteurs d’une théologie pratique”, Les laïcs prennent la parole. Débats et controverses dans le catholicisme après Vatican II. Actes du colloque 30 janvier – 1er février 2014, (Jean-François Galinnier-Pallerola, Philippe Foro et Augustin Laffay dir.), Paris, Parole et Silence, 2014, p. 183-201.
- “L’église Sainte-Croix [de Gannat] à l’époque contemporaine”, Nos églises bourbonnaises, n°27 (2014), p. 58-86.
- “L’université au fil de l’histoire”, Théophilyon, tome XIX-2, 2014, p. 315-329.
- “De Léon XIII à Pie XI, la référence à la ‘chrétienté’, hier, aujourd’hui, demain”, dans La mémoire chrétienne, une mémoire sélective, (Jean-Marie Gueulette dir.), Paris, Le Cerf, 2015, p. 13-29.
- “Correspondance de guerre de l’abbé Georges Malvielle”, La Feuille de garance, n° 36, July 2015, p. 30-45.
- “L’Église et la ‘pastorale de la peur’”, L’inquiétude : peut-on y échapper ? Croire, n° 301, September 2015, p. 29-32.
- “Églises et vie religieuse dans la région gannatoise : Charroux, Naves, Veauce, Vicq. Excursion du 8 mai 2015”, Nos églises bourbonnaises, n° 28, novembre 2015, p. 37-108.
- “Prêtres et séminaristes bourbonnais prisonniers de guerre (1914-1918)”, Bulletin de la Société d’histoire et d’archéologie de Vichy et de ses environs, n° 1165, 2nd semester 2015, p. 7-27.
- “L’Université catholique de Lyon de 1965 à nos jours”, 50 ans de catholicisme à Lyon. De Vatican II à nos jours (1965-2015), (Bernadette Angleraud, Valérie Aubourg et Olivier Charelan dir.), (« Histoire des mondes chrétiens »), Paris, Karthala, 2016, 183-195.
