= Church of Saint-Jacques, Dieppe =

Church in Dieppe, France

Church of Saint-Jacques of Dieppe
- Church of Saint-Jacques of Dieppe
- 49°55′32″N 1°04′42″E
- Location: Dieppe, Seine-Maritime, France
- Country: France
- Denomination: Catholic

History
- Status: Parish church
- Dedication: Saint James

Architecture
- Functional status: Active
- Designated: 1840
- Style: Flamboyant Gothic, Renaissance
- Groundbreaking: 12th century
- Completed: 16th century

The Church of Saint-Jacques in Dieppe (French: Église Saint-Jacques de Dieppe) is a church located in Dieppe, France. The building was classified as a monument historique in 1840. The church is dedicated to Saint James the Great.

== History ==
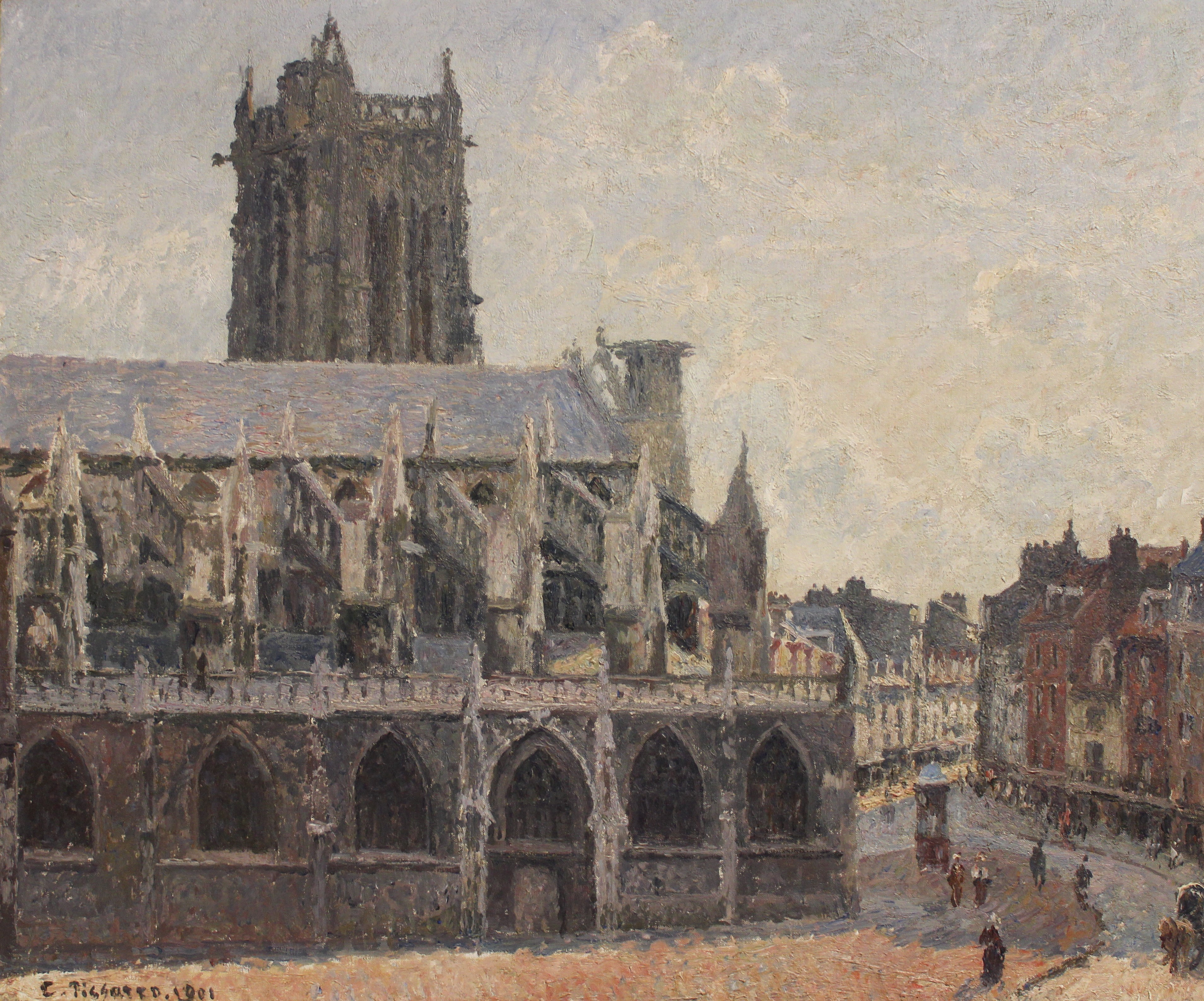
The church painted by Camille Pissarro in 1901.

The church (11th to 16th centuries) features Flamboyant Gothic and Renaissance styles. In 1282, Saint-Jacques church was established as a parish by Guillaume de Flavacourt, Archbishop of Rouen. The north and south transepts date back to the second half of the11th century. The choir, nave, and aisles date from the 13th century, except for the vaults and the triforium of the nave, which date from the 14th century. The great portal was also built in the 14th century. In the 14th century, the tower and chapels located on either side of the great nave of the choir were raised, except for two of them which were part of the church's original plan.

Inside, the Treasure Chapel is decorated with a frieze called des sauvages revealing the various nations discovered by Dieppe's navigators and sailors. At the request of Jean Ango, patron of the church in the 16th century, the artist depicted various scenes from the life of the natives: a procession of celebrations and dances, war episodes, which many archaeologists and scholars came to observe. Victor Hugo also came to see these real stone laceworks on 8 September 1837.

The building has been listed as a monument historique in 1840.

Lucien Lefort, the departmental architect, carried out a restoration operation before 1916.

In January 2015, following the collapse of the dome's framework, the campanile was removed for restoration.

On the night of 6 to 7 November 2017, eight paintings were stolen from the church.

== Gallery ==
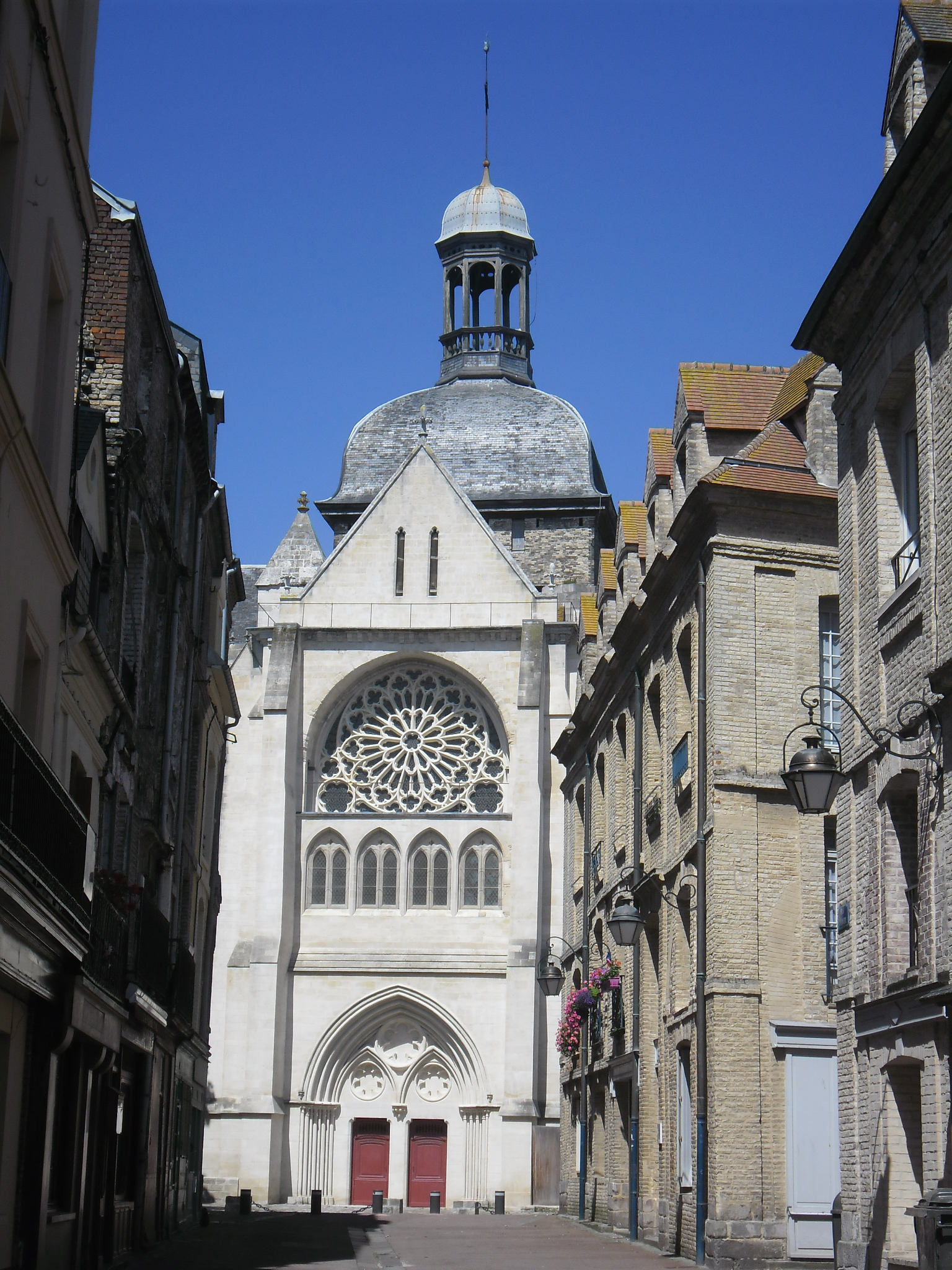
Church of Saint-Jacques of Dieppe (with its campanile), south facade on Rue Pecquet.

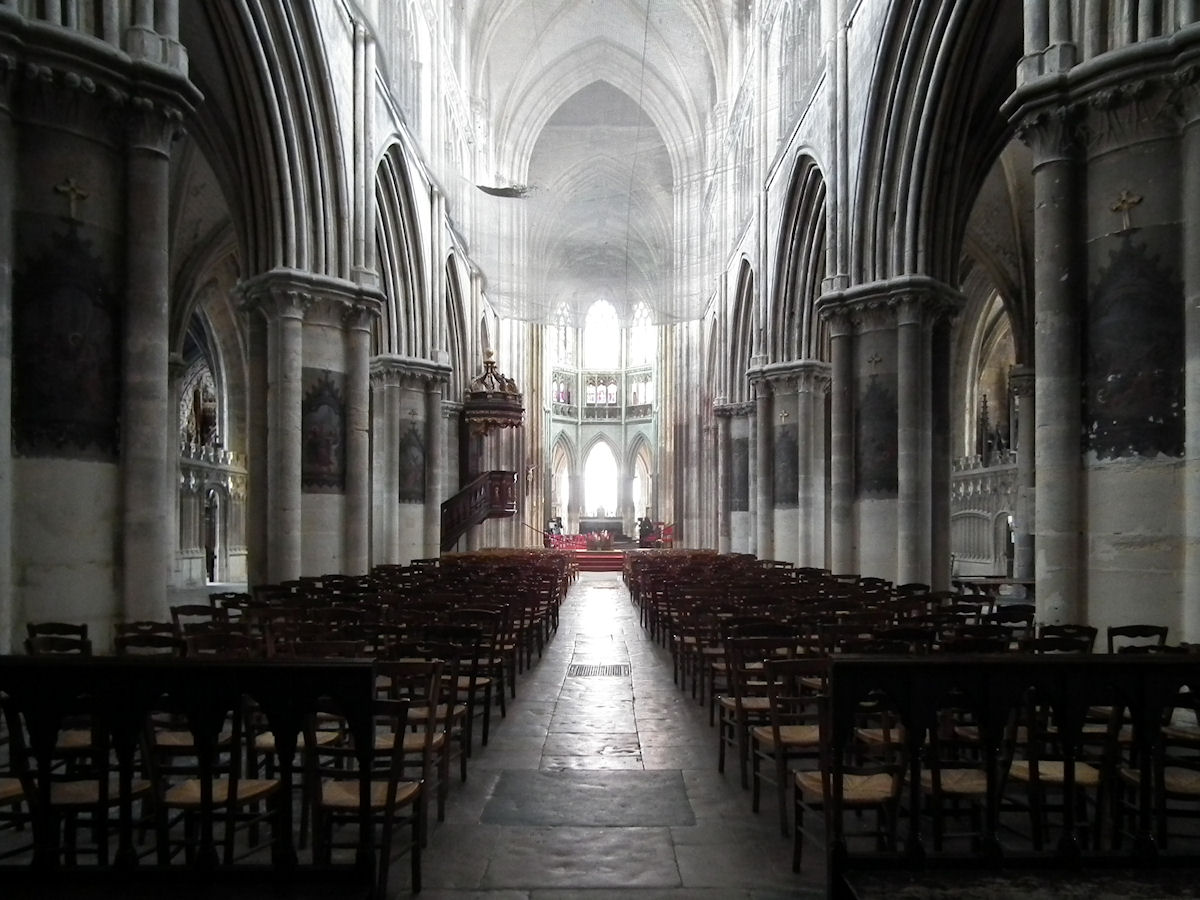
Central nave.

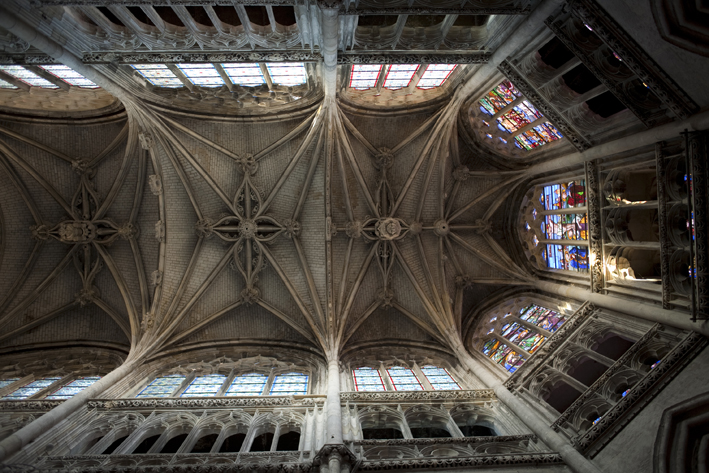
Vault detail.

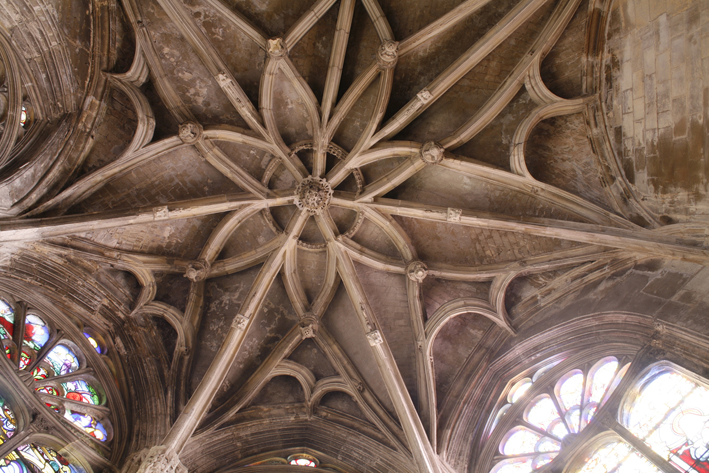
Vault detail.

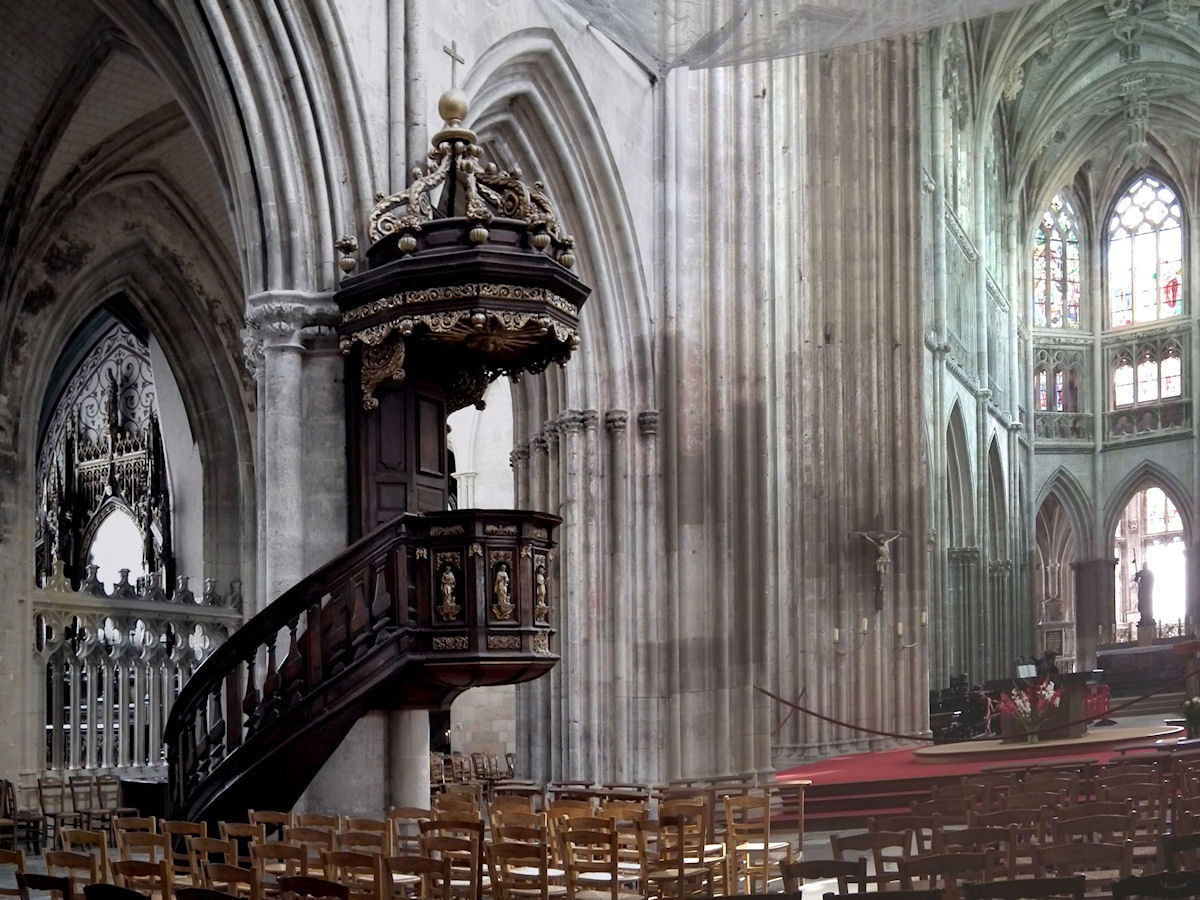
The church's pulpit.

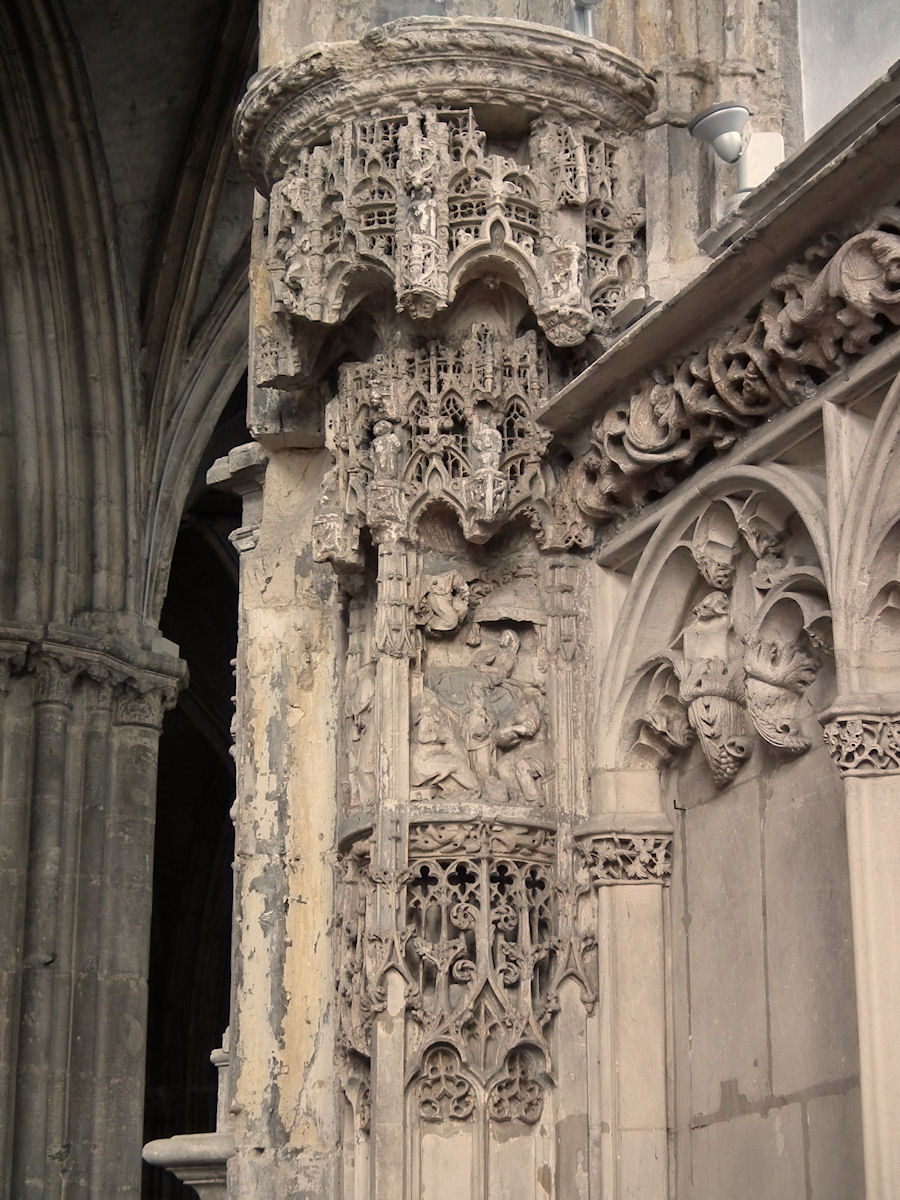
Sculpted stone.

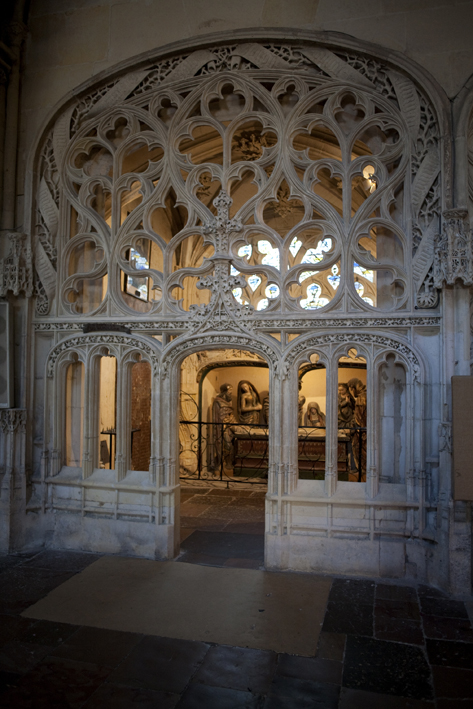
Side chapel.

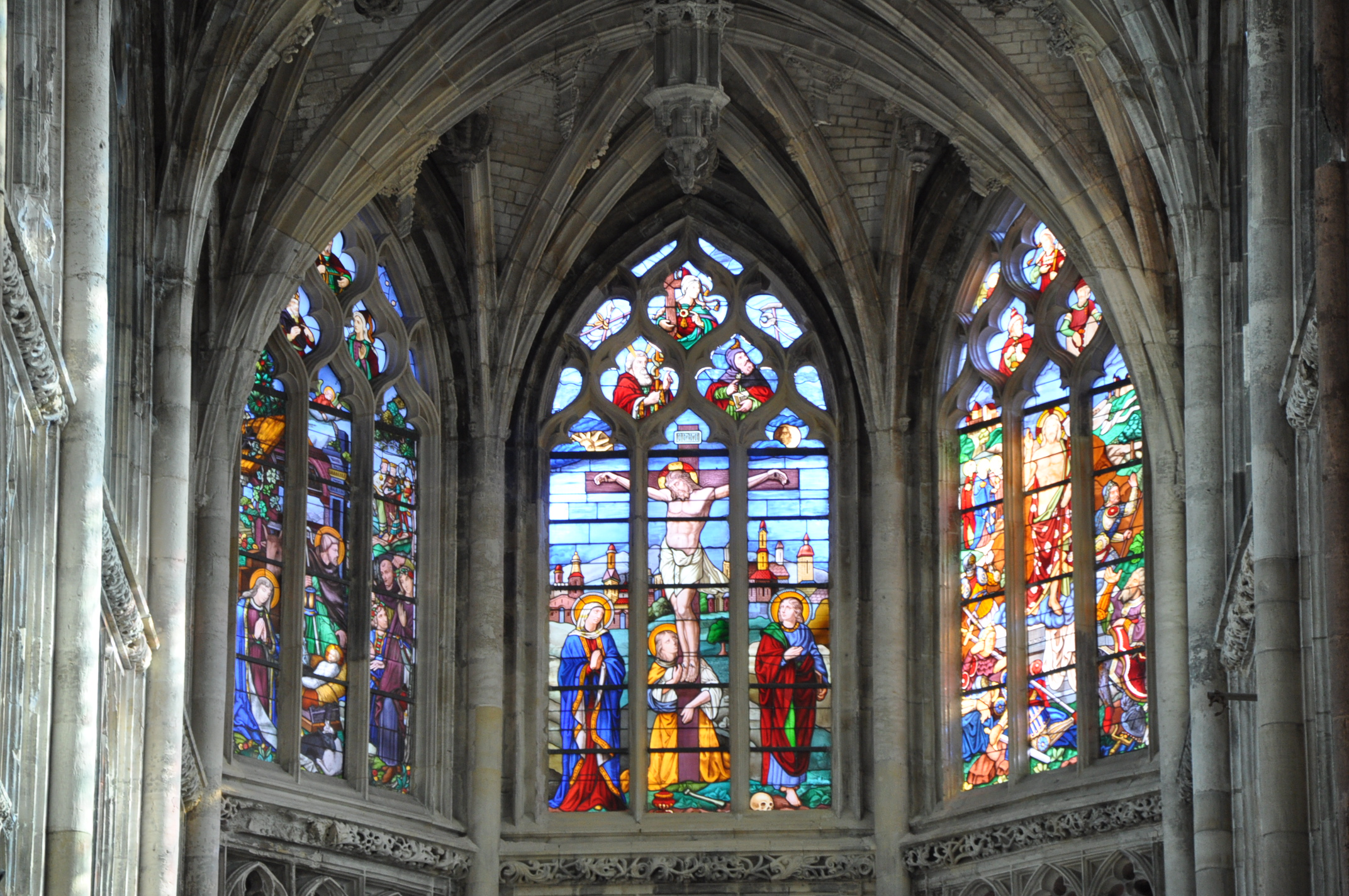
Stained glass windows.

== See also ==
- List of French historic monuments protected in 1840

== Bibliography ==
- Henri Cahingt (1983). The Church of Saint-Jacques of Dieppe. Luneray: Bertout. p. 81. ISBN 2867430054. OCLC 461947763.
- Bizard, Caroline; Prache, Anne (1987). The Church of Saint-Jacques of Dieppe in the Architecture of Normandy. OCLC 491860775.
