= Michel Bassompierre =

French animalier (1948–2026)

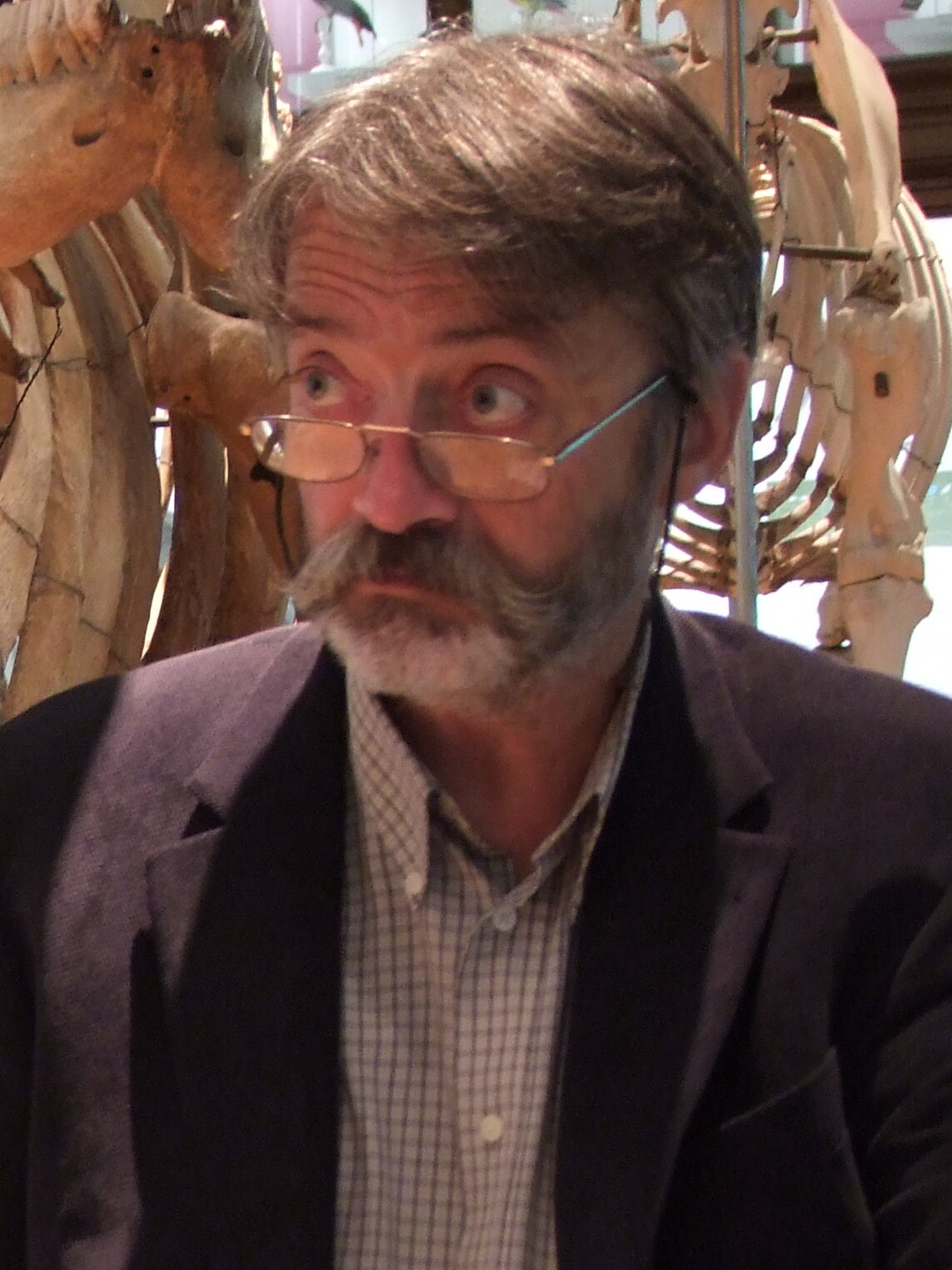
- Bassompierre in 2009
- Born: March 22, 1948; Paris, France
- Died: April 21, 2026 (aged 78); Nantes, France
- Education: École des beaux-arts de Rouen
- Occupation: Animalier artist

Michel Bassompierre (March 22, 1948 – April 21, 2026) was a French sculptor known for his work in animalier art.

Bassompierre died in Nantes on April 21, 2026, at the age of 78. He suffered a sudden illness, followed by a fall, and went into a deep coma, from which did not recover.

== Early life and career ==
Bassompierre was born to an artist and a scientist. His mother, Marcelle, attended the École nationale supérieure des arts décoratifs in Paris before working in wood engraving and surgical illustration; she later served as a cartographer for the CNRS geology department. His father, Pierre, was a hydrogeological engineer at the Bureau de recherches géologiques et minières (BRGM).

During his childhood, Bassompierre practiced drawing and modeling based on animals observed at the Vincennes Zoo, the Menagerie du Jardin des plantes, and the Gallery of Evolution at the National Museum of Natural History.

From 1966 to 1971, he studied at the École des beaux-arts de Rouen under sculpture professor René Leleu, where he studied animal anatomy. Beginning in the 1970s, he resided near Nantes in the Loire-Atlantique department.

== Awards and honours ==
- 1985 Johnson Foundation Award
- 1987: General Council of the Atlantic Act Award
- 1987: Fernand-Méry Award of the National Animal Artists Show
