= Rouen Ceramic Museum =

Coordinates: 49.4455°N 1.0936°E

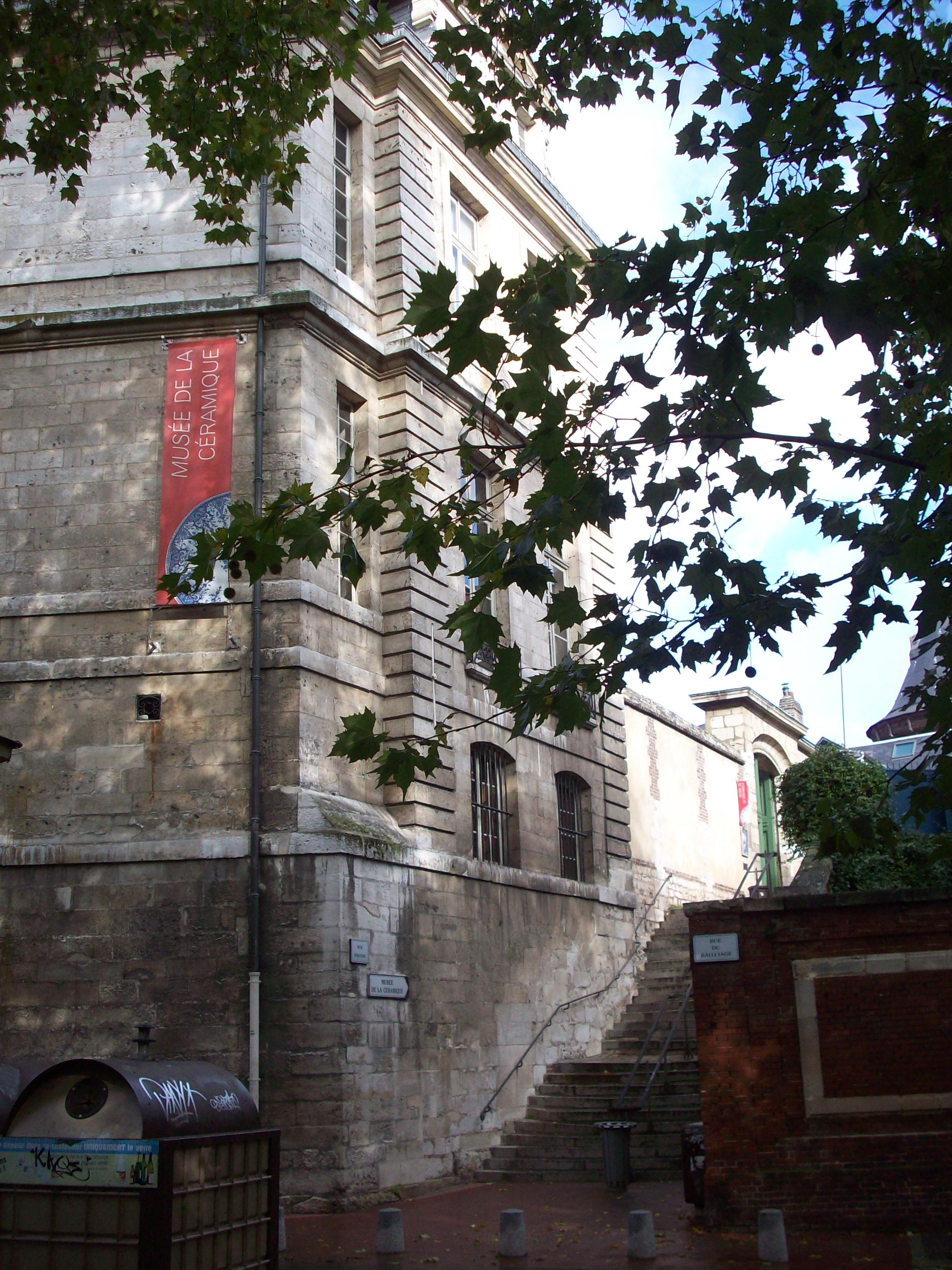

The Rouen Ceramic Museum (French – musée de la Céramique de Rouen) is a museum located in the hôtel d'Hocqueville in the French city of Rouen. It has the title Museum of France. It was established in 1864, and contains a collection of around 5000 pieces.

Since 1984, the museum has occupied the Hôtel d'Hocqueville, known as the Hôtel de Bellegarde. Dating from the 17th century, it is built on the ruins of the castle of Rouen, itself built on the ruins of the Gallo-Roman amphitheater of Rotomagus. This mansion, with part of its outbuildings, was listed as a historic monument on April 8, 1935; it was then classified as a historic monument on July 28, 1937 for the facades and roofs of the hotel.

Albizias have been planted in the museum garden.

A bust of the god Pan (1913) comes from the Jardin des Plantes in Rouen.
