= Jean-Pierre Chaline =

French historian (born 1939)

- Born: 18 December 1939 (age 86); Orléans, France
- Occupation: Historian
- Known for: History of the French Third Republic
- Spouse: Nadine-Josette Chaline
- Children: Olivier Chaline
- Honors: Chevalier of the Ordre des Arts et des Lettres (2015)

Jean-Pierre Chaline (18 December 1939, Orléans), is a French contemporary historian, a specialist of the history of the French Third Republic.

== Biography ==
The father of Olivier Chaline, a historian specializing in Central Europe in the modern era. and husband of Nadine-Josette Chaline, herself an historian, Jean-Pierre Chaline is emeritus professor at the Paris-Sorbonne University. He is also president of the "Société de l'histoire de Normandie", the Amis des Monuments Rouennais, a member of the Académie des sciences, belles-lettres et arts de Rouen and director of the journal Études normandes.

Jean-Pierre Chaline was awarded several prizes by the Académie française:

- Prix Alfred Née in 1984 for Les bourgeois de Rouen. Une élite urbaine au XIXe siècle
- Prix René Petiet in 1987 for L’Affaire Noiret
- Prix Biguet in 1996 for Sociabilité et érudition. Les Sociétés savantes en France.

On 14 December 2015, he was elevated to the rank of chevalier of the Ordre des Arts et des Lettres.

== Main works ==
- 1977: Deux bourgeois en leur temps. documents sur la société rouennaise du XIXe, Picard, ISBN 2708406523;
- 1982: Les Bourgeois de Rouen : Une élite urbaine au XIXe, Presses de Sciences Po, Paris, ISBN 2724604695;
- 1998: La Restauration française, series Que sais-je ?, Presses universitaires de France, Paris, ISBN 2130488366;
- 1999: Les Sociétés savantes, Aubier Montaigne, ISBN 2700722493;
- 2003: Lycées et lycéens normands au XIXe, Société de l'histoire de Normandie, ISBN 2853510123;
- 2004: Rouen, intelligence d'une ville, Ouest-France, ISBN 2737334306;
- 2009: Les Dynasties normandes, Éditions Perrin, ISBN 978-2-262-01703-3
