= Nadine-Josette Chaline =

French historian

Nadine-Josette Chaline (born 1938) is a contemporary French historian, specialist in religious history, especially Christians in France.

== Biography ==
Nadine-Josette Chaline is married to Jean-Pierre Chaline, himself a historian (a specialist of the nineteenth century), and the mother of Olivier Chaline, a historian specializing in Central Europe in the modern era. She taught at the University of Picardie Jules Verne. She is a member of the Académie des sciences, belles-lettres et arts de Rouen.

From 1993 to 1996, she presided the Association française d'histoire religieuse contemporaine.

In 1986, Nadine-Josette Chaline was awarded the Prix Yvan Loiseau by the Académie française for her work Des catholiques normands, sous la troisième République, crises-combats-renouveaux.

== Main works ==
- 1976: Le Diocèse de Rouen-Le Havre, Éditions Beauchesne
- 1993: Chrétiens dans la Première Guerre mondiale, Éditions du Cerf, ISBN 2204047961
- 1995: L'Enseignement catholique en France aux XIXe et XXe siècles, Cerf
- 2001: Carmes et Carmélites en France du XVIIe siècle à nos jours, in collaboration, Cerf
- 2003: Jean Lecanuet. Témoignages de François Bayrou et Dominique Baudis, in collaboration, Beauchesne, ISBN 2701014050 ;
- 2008: Gardiens de la mémoire. Les monuments aux morts de la Grande Guerre dans l'Allier (with Daniel Moulinet's collaboration), Yzeure, ISBN 2-9518027-3-0 ;
- 2014: Émile Guillaumin. Paysan-écrivain bourbonnais, soldat de la Grande Guerre, Josette Chaline éd., Paris, Presses de l'université Paris-Sorbonne, ill. (prix Allen 2015) ISBN 978-2-84050-963-9 (annotated publication of the wartime correspondence of Emile Guillaumin)
