= Mehmet Aksoy (filmmaker) =

British-Kurdish filmmaker and activist (1985–2017)

- Mehmet Aksoy in Syria after joining the YPG
- Born: 24 February 1985; Istanbul or Malatya, Turkey
- Died: 26 September 2017 (aged 32); Raqqa, Syria
- Cause of death: Islamic State hit-and-run attack
- Burial place: Highgate Cemetery, London
- Other name: Fîraz Dağ
- Education: Queen Mary, University of London; Goldsmiths, University of London
- Occupation: Film director
- Years active: 2005–2017
- Known for: Kurdish Question (website)
- Notable work: Panfilo (2014)
- Movement: Democratic confederalism Kurdish Political Movement in Turkey
- Website: http://kurdishquestion.com

Mehmet Aksoy (24 February 1985 – 26 September 2017), nom de guerre Fîraz Dağ, was a British-Kurdish filmmaker, citizen-journalist and political activist, known as the founder and editor-in-chief of the Kurdish Question website. He served as a press officer with the People's Protection Units (YPG) and was killed while covering the Syrian Democratic Forces' battle to retake Raqqa in northern Syria from the Islamic State (ISIS).

== Life and work ==
Aksoy was born in Istanbul or Malatya to Kalender Aksoy of Kürecik (Malatya Province) and Zeynep née Konca of Elbistan (Maraş Province). His family belongs to the Kurdish Alevi community. In 1988, his parents moved from Malatya to Hackney and then Enfield in London, where he attended Leyton Sixth Form College and Barnet College. (Note: According to one of the sources, he only moved to the UK in 1995.)

Aksoy took up the socialist cause as a teenager and read the Black Guerrilla Family leader George Jackson's 1972 book Blood In My Eye at age 17. His interest in the Kurdish independence movement began in 2004 when he first visited the Kurdish Community Centre in Haringey, north London. He joined the Kurdish Youth Assembly and became influenced by Abdullah Öcalan's prison writings on democratic confederalism.

Aksoy studied filmmaking at Queen Mary, University of London, graduating in 2007, and later at Goldsmiths, University of London, where he received a master's degree in 2014. He made his debut at the London Kurdish Film Festival in 2005. His short film Panfilo, made for his MA course, was released in 2014. It won awards at the Italian festival Roma Film Corto and the UK's National Student Film Festival in 2015, and was screened at that year's Ankara Film Festival. Aksoy's work as a short film director probed into the British-Kurdish identity and depicted the struggles of the Kurdish diaspora in the UK. He also published short stories and translated a collection of poetry. He became the programme director of the London Kurdish Film Festival by the time of its 8th edition in 2013.

After leaving QMUL in 2007, Aksoy joined the editorial team of the Kurdish.com website. He later set up and edited the internet-based news portal The Region. In 2013, Aksoy founded the website Kurdish Question, dedicated to the emergent political project of the Democratic Autonomous Administration of North and East Syria (Rojava). Serving as Kurdish Question's editor-in-chief, he wrote and lectured on the struggles of the Kurdish political movement.

In June 2017, Aksoy travelled to Rojava in northern Syria with the intention of recording the stories of SDF's fighters against ISIS. He joined the People's Protection Units as press officer, adopting the nom de guerre Fîraz Dağ in honour of his uncle, Firaz, who had been killed fighting for the Kurdistan Workers' Party (PKK) militia during its conflict with the Turkish military in the 1990s. He reported on Rojava's first-ever elections, held on 22 September 2017. At the time of his death, he was preparing a feature-length documentary on the Raqqa operation.

== Death and funeral ==
Aksoy died at Raqqa on the morning of 26 September 2017 when ISIS fighters, possibly disguised as civilians or Kurdish militiamen, staged a surprise attack on the near-frontline military base where he was staying. Before the attackers were killed, they broke through a guarded gate into the compound and shot Aksoy alongside a female Kurdish journalist dead outside the SDF Press Centre.

Aksoy was the fifth British citizen to be killed in Northern Syria while fighting ISIS.

On the day of Aksoy's initial mourning service in Derik in northern Syria in early October 2017, more than 2,000 people turned up at the Kurdish Community Centre in Haringey to pay tribute. On 25 October, his body was returned to his family in the UK. He was buried on the eastern side of Highgate Cemetery in London on 10 November 2017. The funeral ceremony, coinciding with the London celebrations of the annual World Day for Kobani, included live video speeches by YPG spokespeople Nesrin Abdullah and Nuri Mahmoud, and a minute of silence at the grave of Karl Marx. The occasion also ignited pro-Kurdish demonstrations throughout Turkey and Germany.

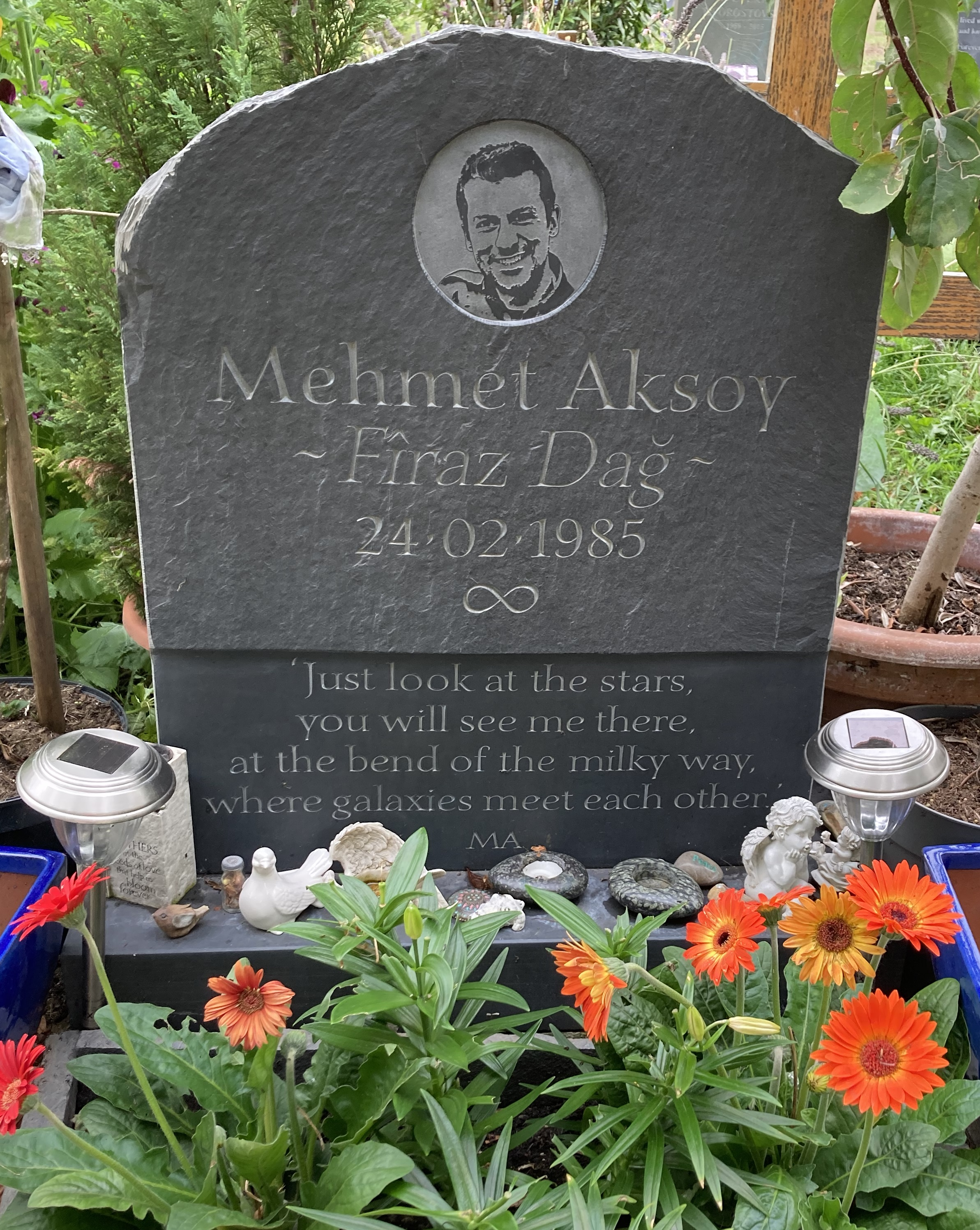
Aksoy's grave in Highgate Cemetery, London, carved by Teucer Wilson.
