= Olivier Chaline =

French historian (born 1964)

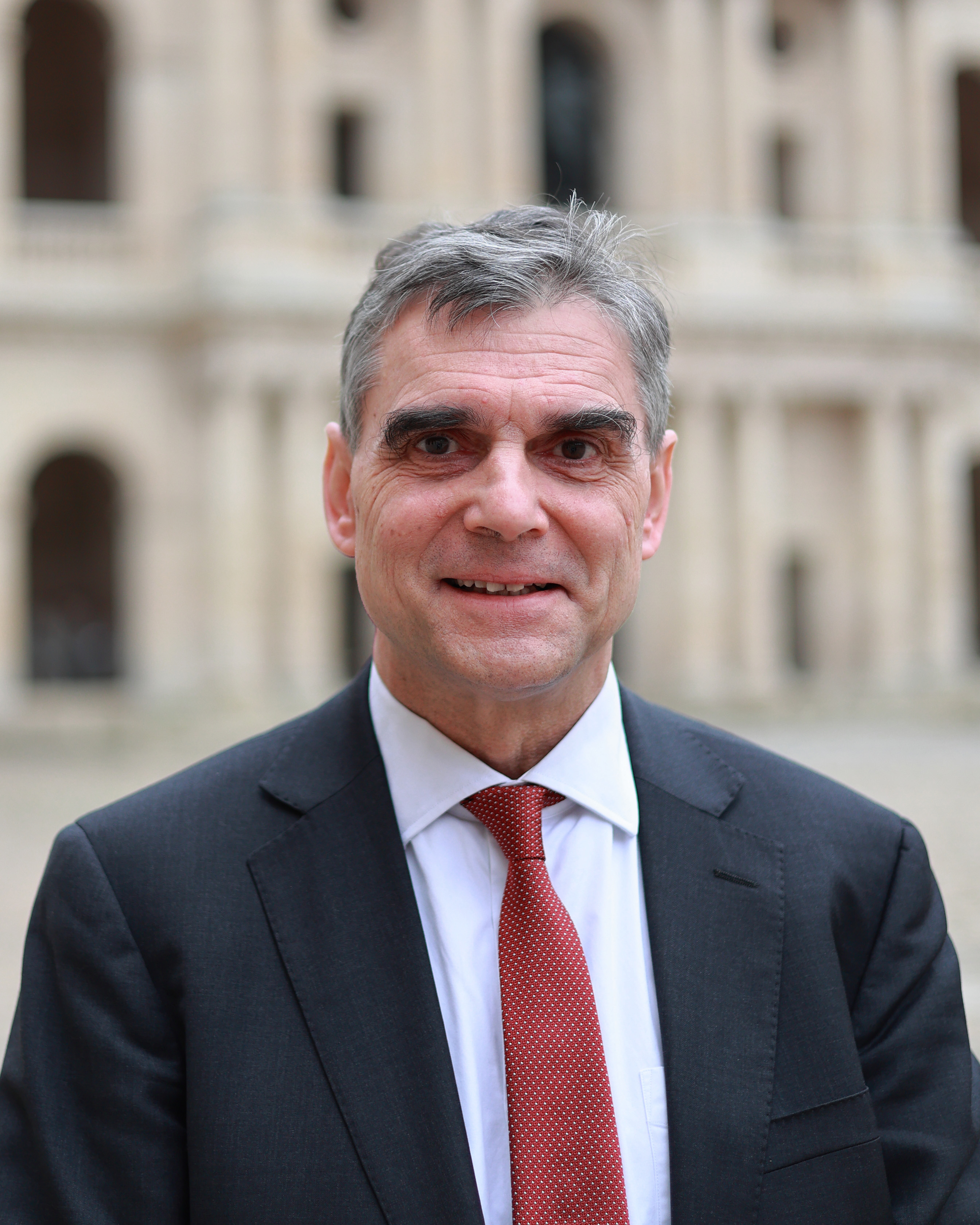
Chaline in 2023

Olivier Chaline (29 December 1964) is a French historian who specialises in the history of Central Europe.

== Biography ==
Chaline was born on 29 December 1964, in Neuilly-sur-Seine, to historians Jean-Pierre Chaline and Nadine-Josette Chaline. Chaline entered the École Normale Supérieure (ENS) in 1984. After he obtained his agrégation in history, he taught at the ENS before being appointed to the University of Rennes II (1999–2001), then to the Paris-Sorbonne University. He occasionally teaches at Charles University at Prague.

In 2006, Olivier Chaline was given the Prix Guizot of the Académie française for his book Le Règne de Louis XIV.

== Main works ==
- 1996: La France au XVIIIe siècle, 1715–1787, Belin, Paris, ISBN 978-2-7011-4015-5;
- 1996: Godart de Belbeuf. Le Parlement, le roi et les Normands, Bertout, ISBN 978-2-86743-250-7
- 1998: La Reconquête catholique de l’Europe centrale, XVIe–XVIIIe siècle, Éditions du Cerf, Paris, ISBN 978-2-204-05838-4
- 1999: La Place du Vieux-Marché et le Martyre de Jeanne d'Arc, éditions Charles Corlet, ISBN 978-2-85480-798-1
- 2000: La Bataille de la Montagne Blanche (8 novembre 1620). Un mystique chez les guerriers, Noesis, Paris ISBN 978-2-911606-30-4, Prize XVIIe in 2001;
- 2005: Le Règne de Louis XIV, Flammarion, ISBN 978-2-08-210518-7
- 2009: L'Année des quatre dauphins, Flammarion, ISBN 978-2-08-122451-3.
- 2010: La Normandie. Un destin entre terre et mer. Découvertes Gallimard. Vol. 561. Éditions Gallimard. 2010. p. 160. ISBN 978-2-07-035546-4.
- 2010: La Mer vénitienne. Beaux Arts. Arles, France: Actes Sud. 2010. p. 200. ISBN 978-2-7427-9033-3.
- 2016: La mer et la France. Quand les Bourbons voulaient dominer les océans, Flammarion

== Honours ==
- Chevalier de l’Ordre national du Mérite (2011)
