= École supérieure d'art et design Le Havre-Rouen =

Art school based in Le Havre and Rouen, France

École supérieure d'art et design Le Havre-Rouen (ESADHaR)
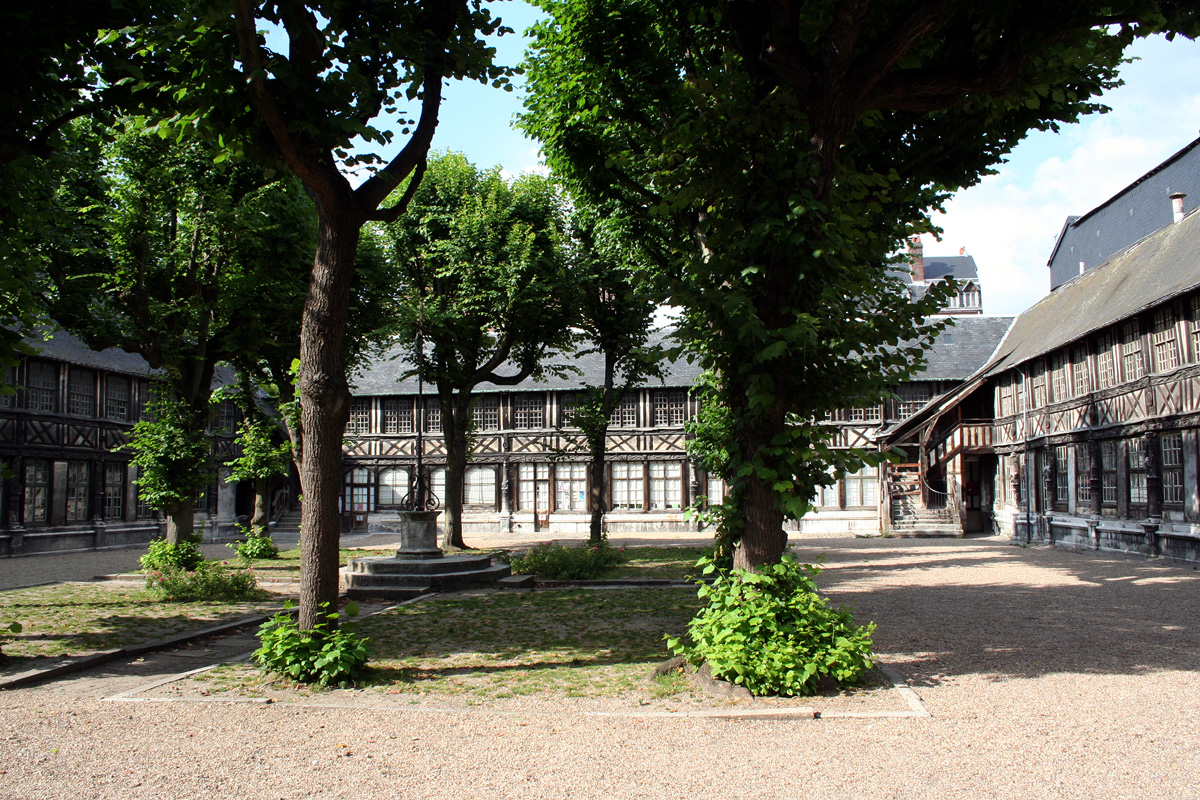
- Some of the school's original buildings
- Type: Public
- Established: 1750
- Director: Ulrika Byttner
- Students: 400
- Undergraduates: BA
- Postgraduates: Master
- Location: Rouen, Le Havre, France; 49.4479°N 1.1342°E
- Website: esadhar.fr

The École supérieure d'art et design Le Havre-Rouen is a public school of art and design established in two of the main cities of Normandy, Rouen and Le Havre.

== History ==
Rouen art school was funded by painter Jean-Baptiste Descamps in 1741, and was officially established in 1750.
Le Havre art school was created in 1800 by Antoine-Marie Lemaître, an architect whose son was XIXth century comedian Frédérick Lemaître.
The two schools merged into one in 2010.

== Notable alumni ==
- Michel Bassompierre
- Georges Braque
- Jean Dubuffet
- Raoul Dufy
- Othon Friesz
- Invader
- Claude Monet
- Michel Ocelot
