= Hôtel de Bourgtheroulde =

Coordinates: 49°26′31″N 1°05′17″E

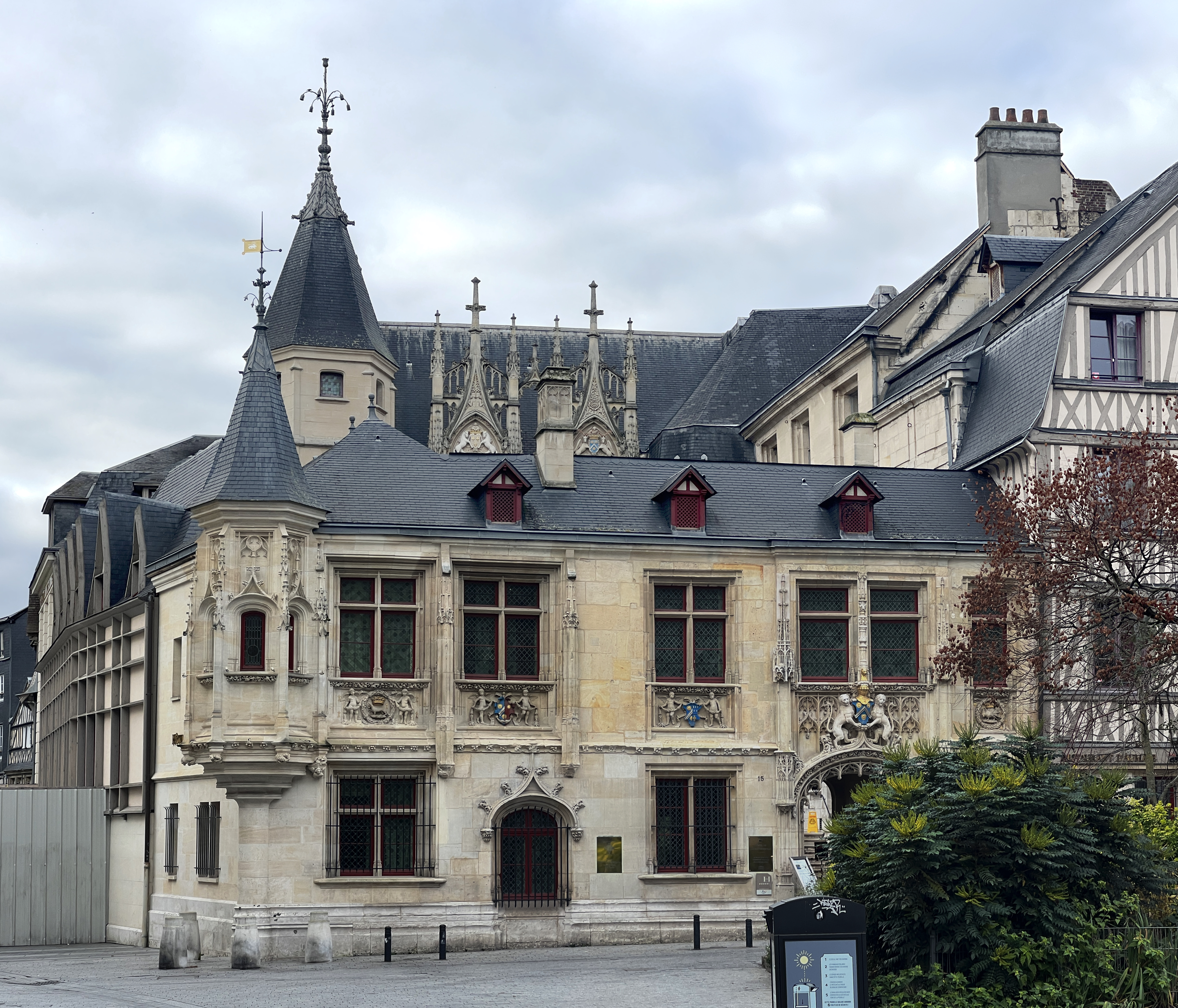

The hôtel de Bourgtheroulde is a former hôtel particulier at 15 place de la Pucelle (formerly the place du Marché aux veaux and long thought to have been the square where Joan of Arc was burned) in the historic city centre of Rouen.

It mostly dates to the 16th century. Its façades and rooves were made a monument historique on 11 January 1924 Its architecture is similar to that of the Rouen Courthouse and the city's Bureau des Finances, both of the same date as the Hôtel.

Guillaume II Le Roux, lord of Bourgtheroulde and member of the Exchequer of Normandy, decided to build a stone townhouse worthy of his rank at the end of the 15th century and chose the Louis XII style, the transition between the Flamboyant Gothic style and French Renaissance architecture.

His son Guillaume III continued embellishing the building and completed his father's work on it. In the inside courtyard, on the left, is the Aumale Gallery with high-quality Renaissance sculpted decoration showing the Field of the Cloth of Gold meeting between Francis I of France and Henry VIII of England and scenes from Petrarch's allegorical poem Triumphs.

The building was partially damaged on 19 April 1944 during 'red week' and its interior decor was destroyed by bombing on 26 August the same year, just before the city's liberation. Until 2006 it housed the Crédit industriel de Normandie bank, before being completely restructured as a deluxe hôtel and reopening in April 2010.

== History ==
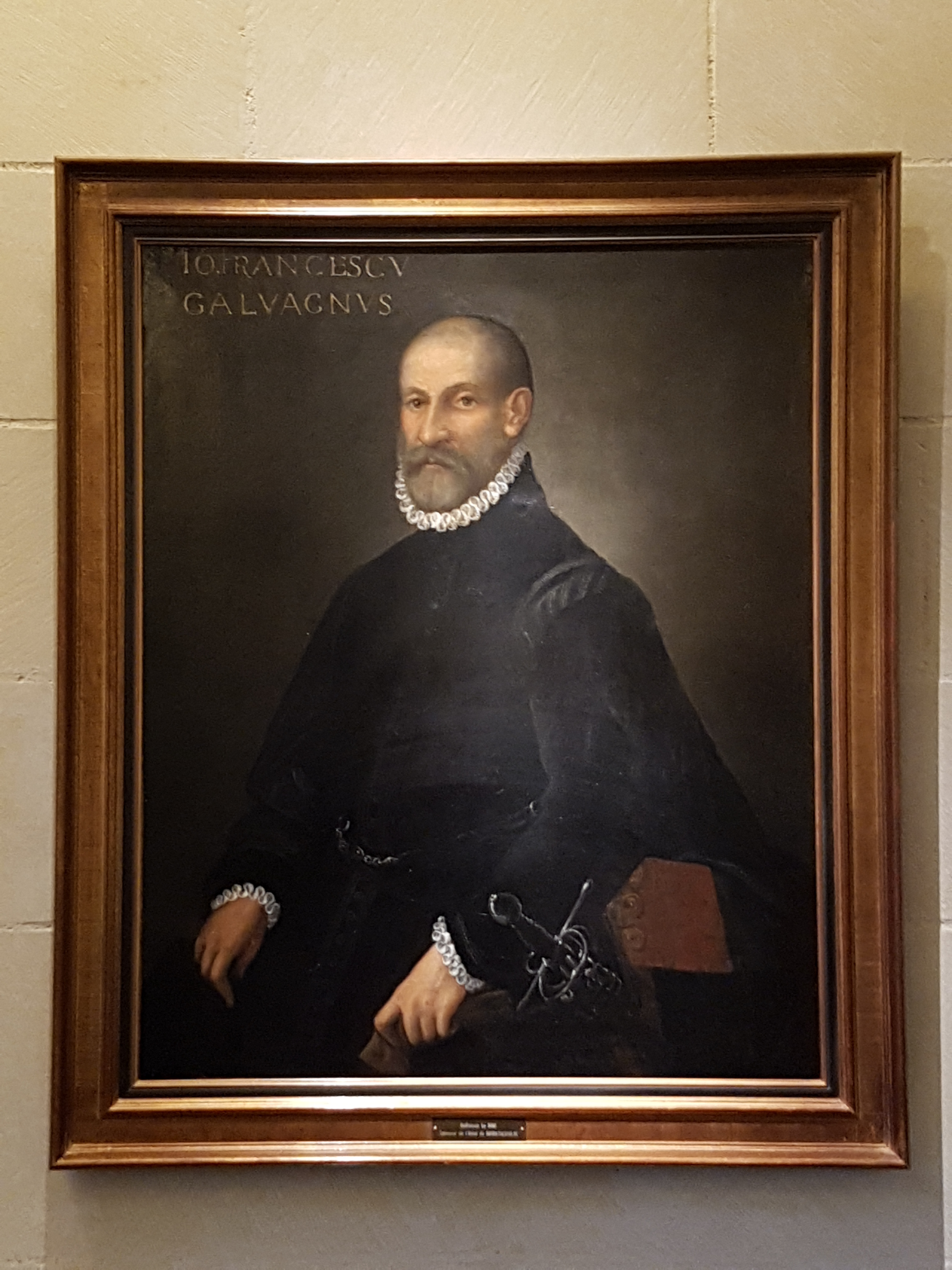
Painting of Guillaume Le Roux, lord of Bourgtheroulde, who began the hôtel.

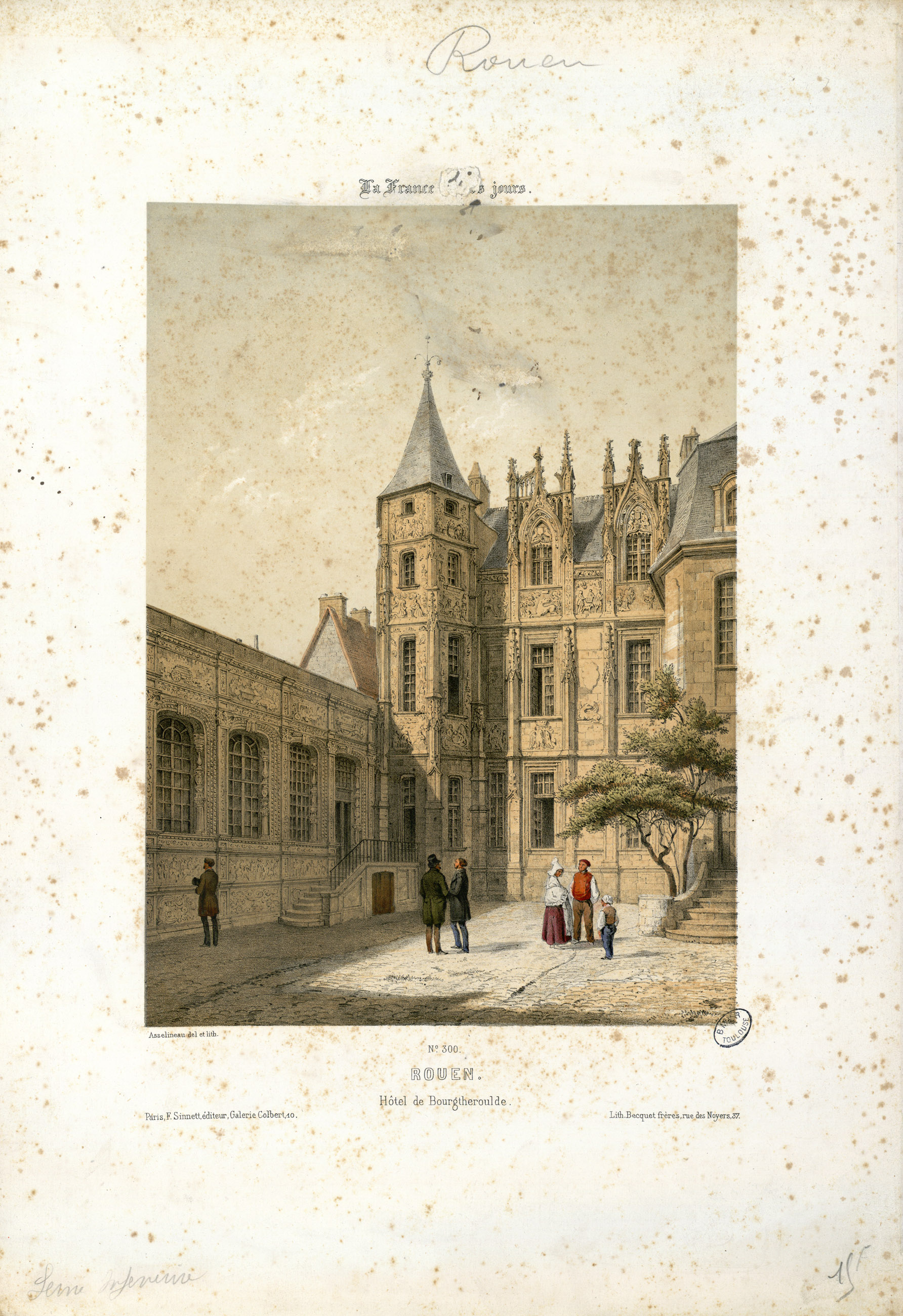

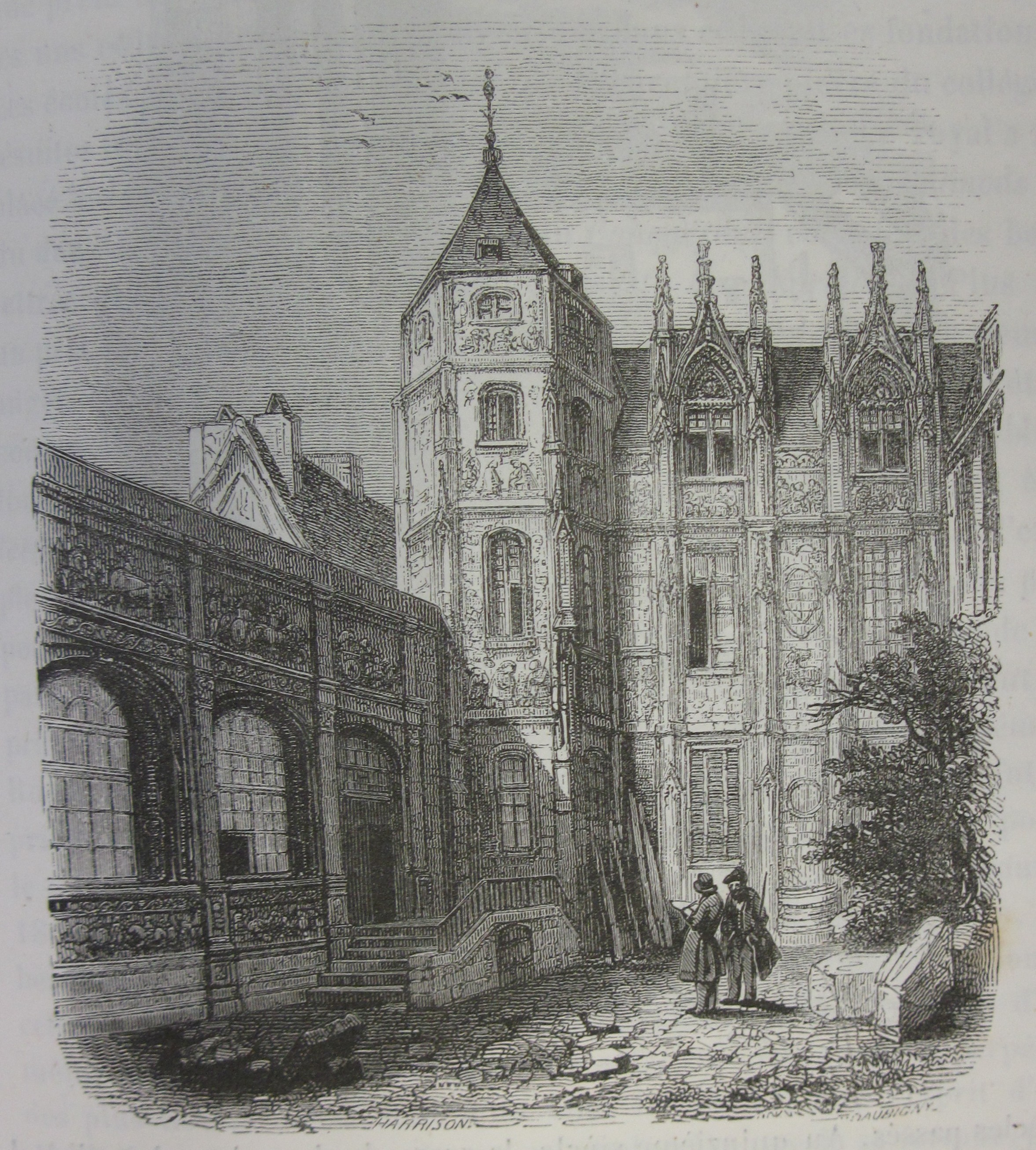

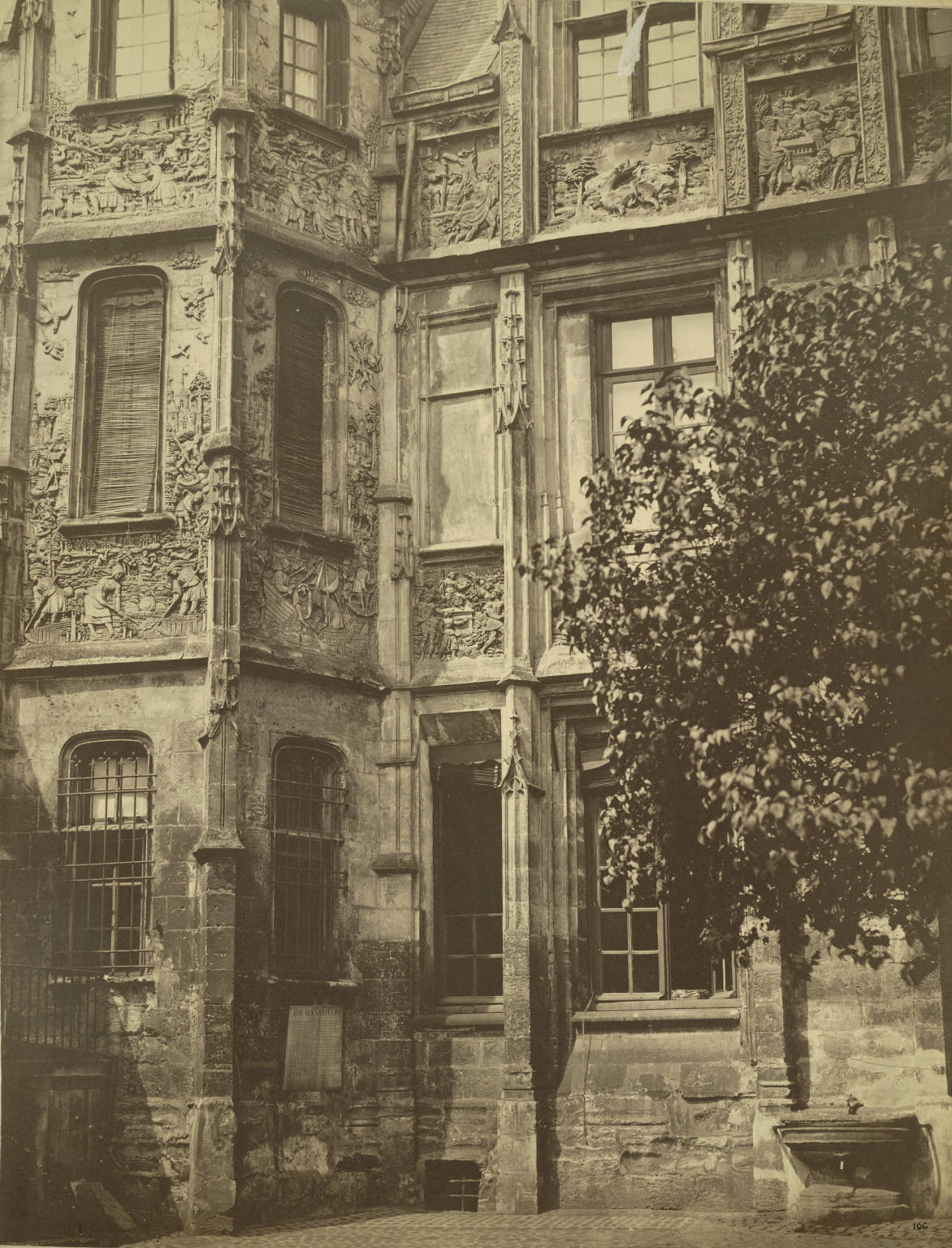

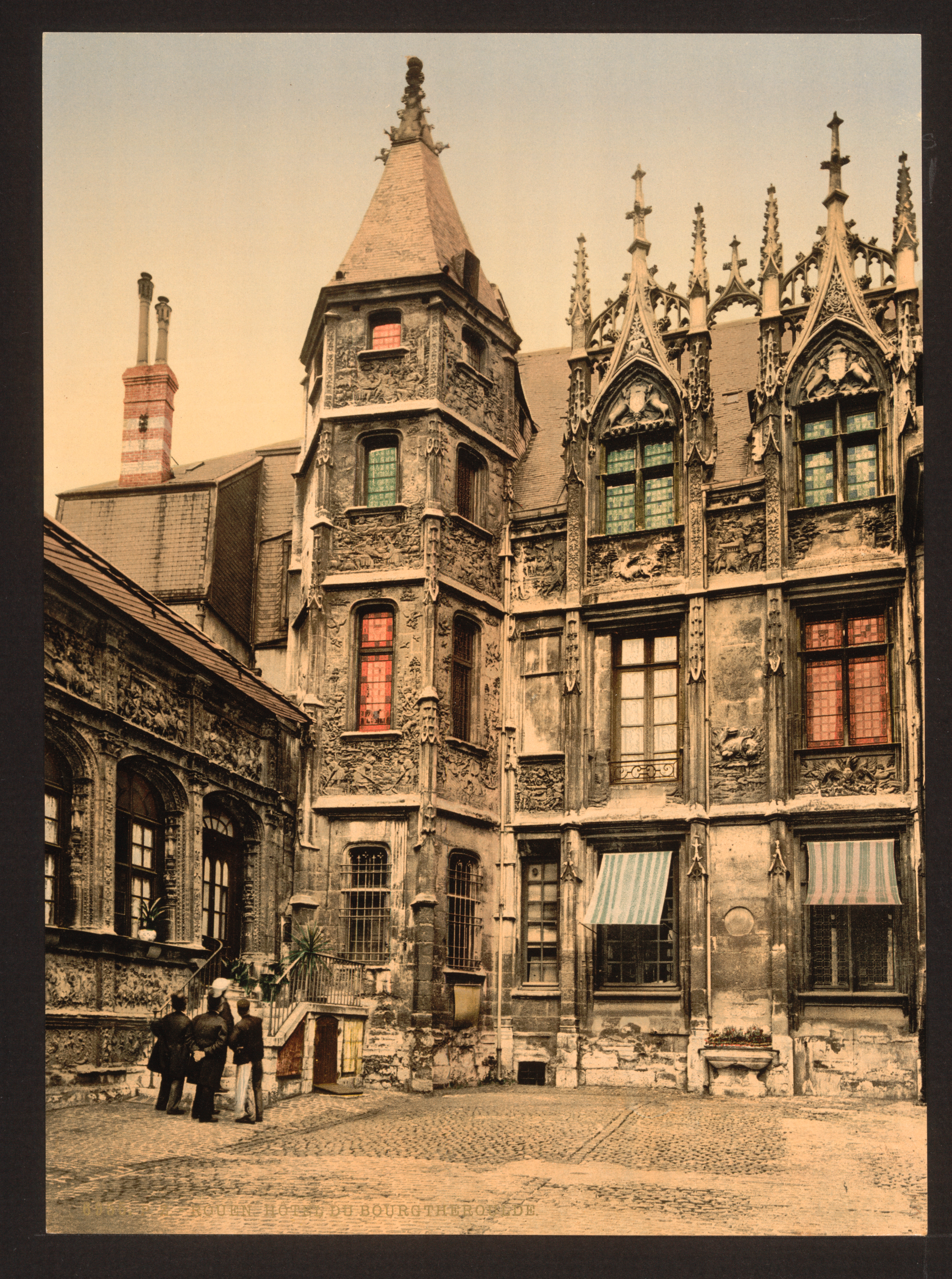

Guillaume II seems to have begun its construction in 1501 and on his death in 1520 it passed to his son Guillaume III, abbot of Saint-Martin d'Auchy abbey in Aumale, who built the Aumale Gallery, named after him. In 1532 it was inherited again, this time by Guillaume III's brother Claude Le Roux.

The building played host to eminent guests, such as cardinal Alessandro de Médici in 1596, and stayed in the Le Roux family until the end of the 17th century. A bad fire in 1770 destroyed the north wing, which was rebuilt. It survived the French Revolution and in 1848 became the headquarters of the Comptoir d'Escompte bank. It later became the headquarters of the Credit industriel de Normandie bank, a regional bank in the CIC group until the end of 2006.

Once the building's complete restoration by the société lilloise d'investissement hôtelier (SLIH) was complete, it became a 5-star hotel in the Marriott International group in April 2010.

== Components ==
It has a long history and - though almost all its original interior decoration is now lost - it remains one of the main monuments in the city. The façade facing place de la Pucelle and those facing onto the courtyard have been seriously modified - the north façade was rebuilt after the 1770 fire. Hit by a bomb in 1944, the south tower has been completely rebuilt but without its sculptural decoration. The gardens have been replaced by modern arrangements.

=== Main façade ===
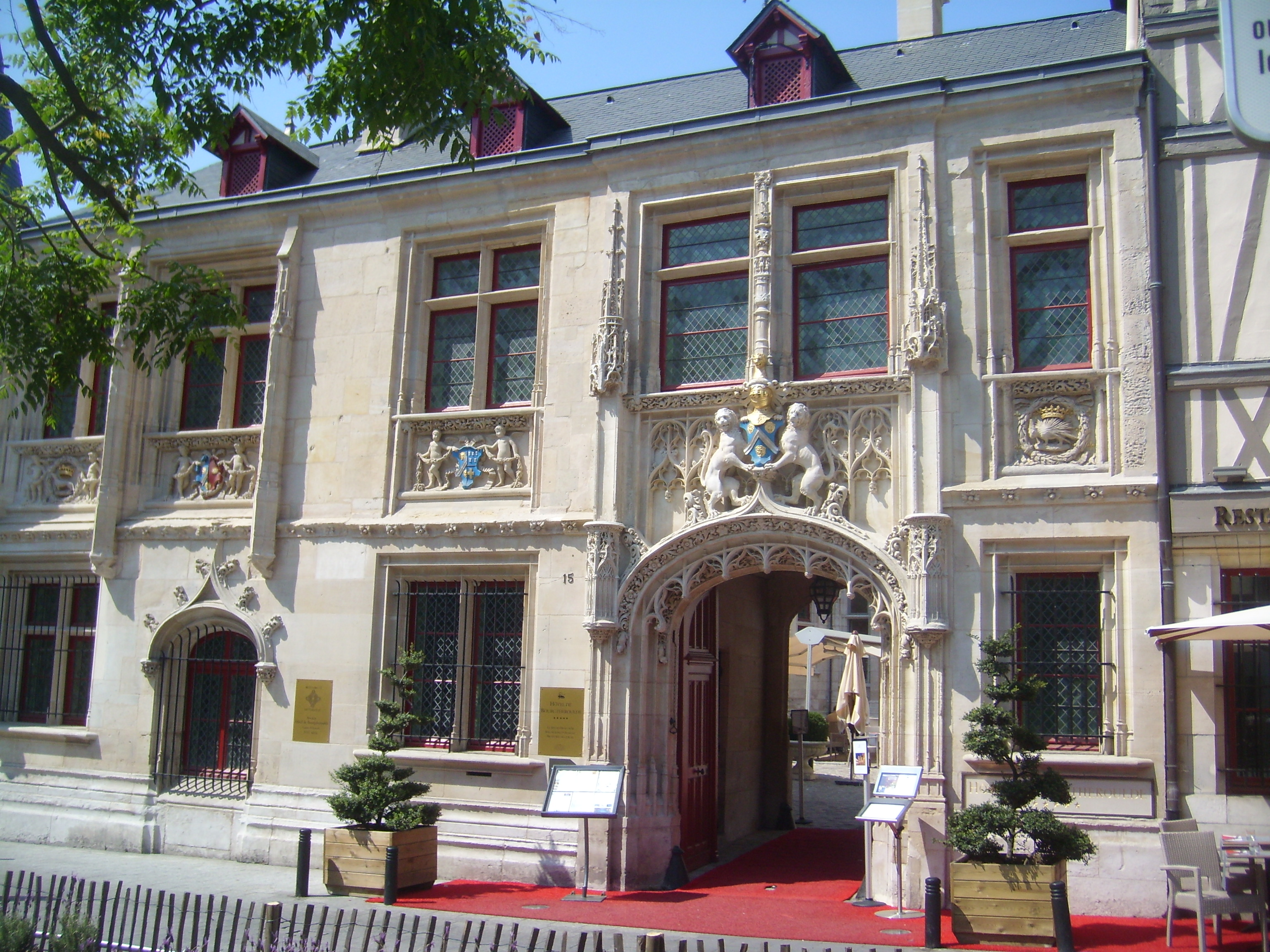
Façade on the Place de la Pucelle.

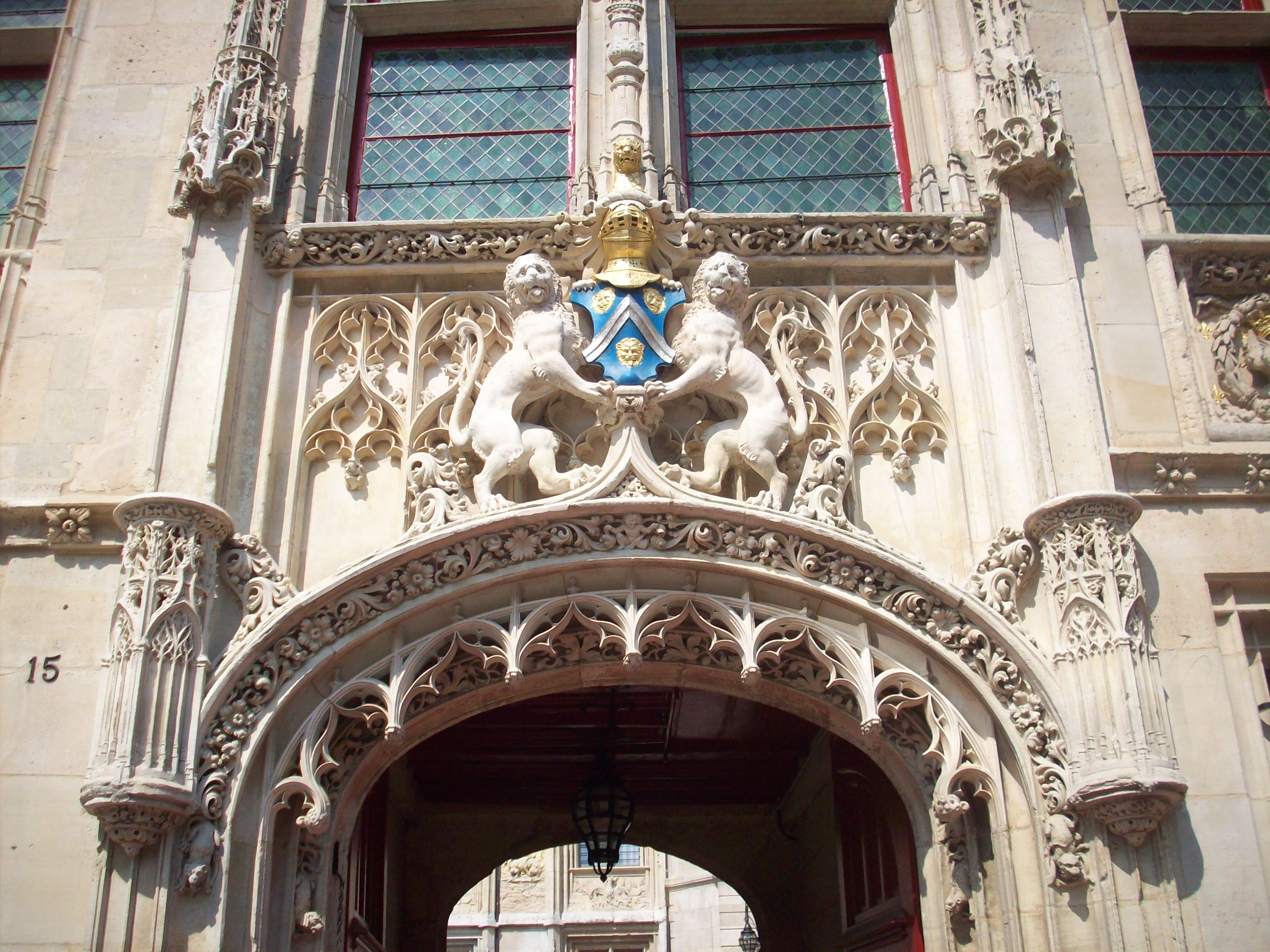
Basket-handle arch entrance with festoons, surmounted by two Norman leopards and the coat of arms of the lords of Bourgtheroulde.

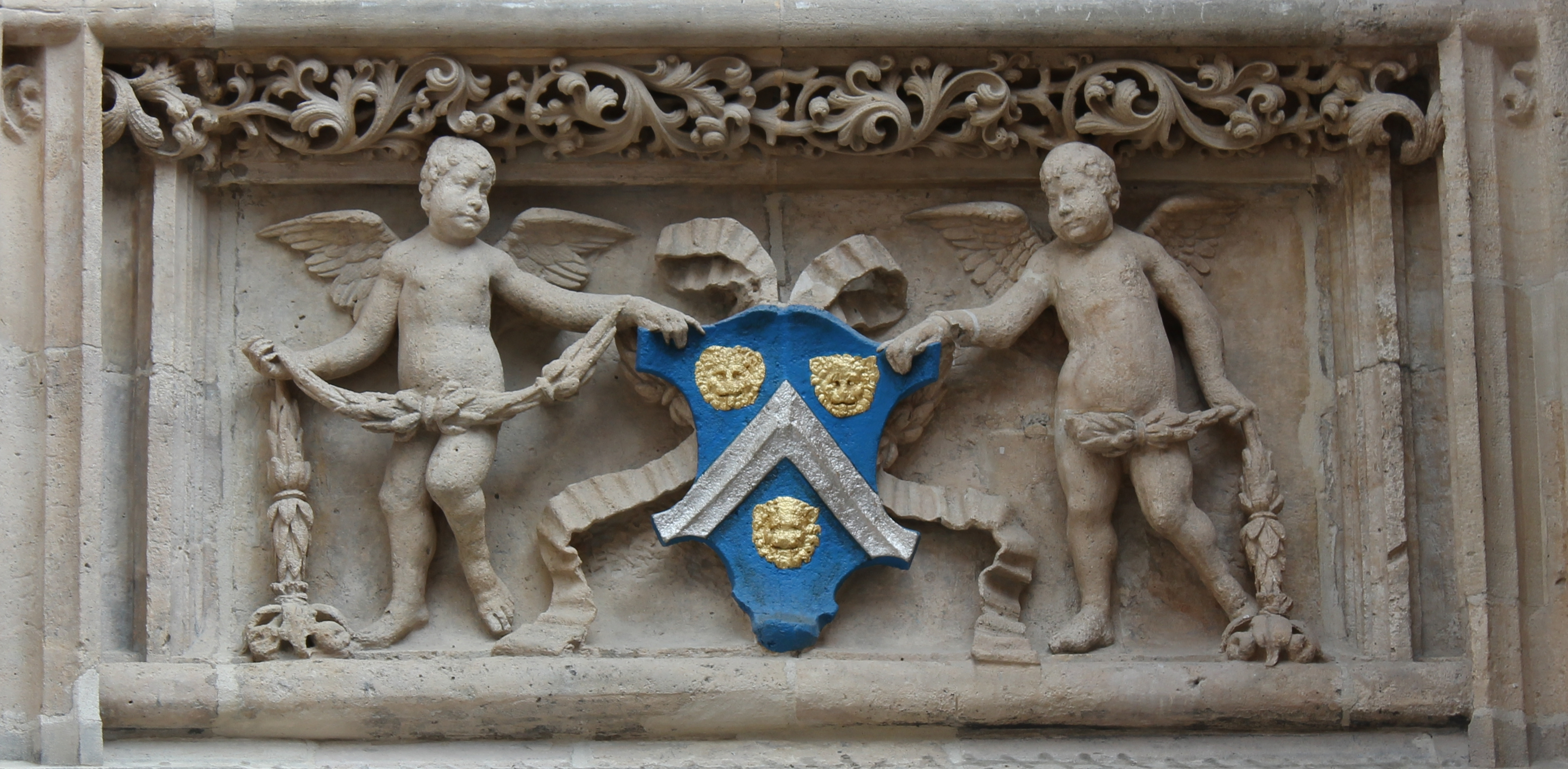
Coat of arms of the lords of Bourgtheroulde.

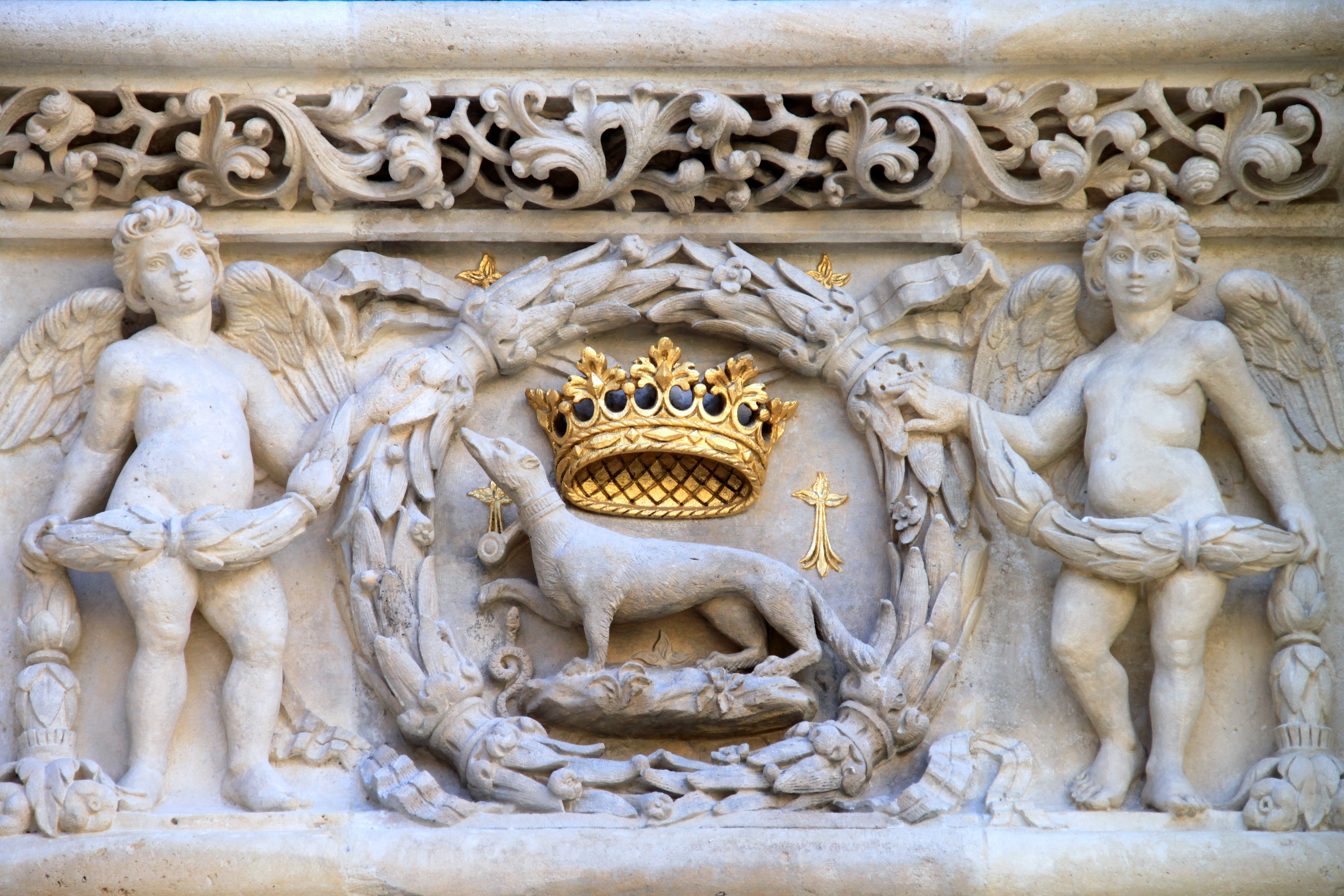
The ermine, Anne of Britanny's emblem.

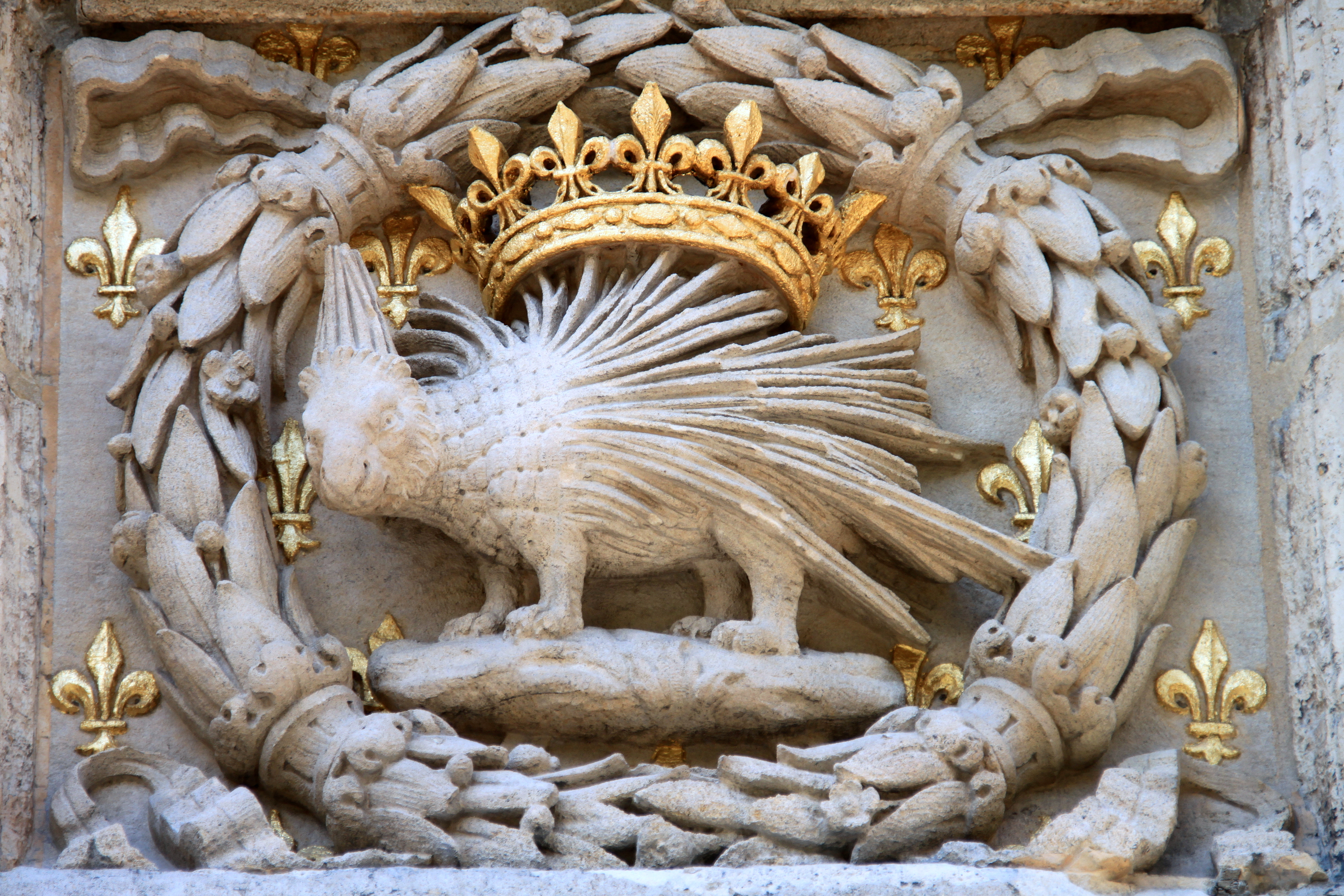
The porcupine, Louis XII's emblem.

It has been badly damaged over time. The polygonal watchtower forming its left corner was destroyed in 1824 - workers installing a streetlamp had caused a partial collapse and the town decided to demolish the rest for urban improvements going on at that time. It was once completely covered in Renaissance bas-reliefs of pastoral scenes, which were mostly destroyed by bombing in 1944. The tower was rebuilt in 2009-2010 but it proved impossible to reconstruct the sculptures, though it was possible to restore the roofline's original appearance with a finial. Another small corbelled watchtower flanked the porte cochère to the north of the façade - it fell into ruin and before 1682 it disappeared.

The exterior has been rearranged several times in the 19th and 20th centuries. The ground floor was altered to turn it into shops and all that survives of it is a porte cochère, a few pilasters and the upstairs windows. The sculptural decoration has disappeared, though Jean-Baptiste Foucher reconstructed it in 1893. That porche d'entrée is now decorated with two Angevin-Norman leopards supporting the Bourgtheroulde family arms and the porcupine, symbol of Louis XII. Cette restitution ne s'appuie sur aucune trace archéologique

The original arrangement seems to have been with a terrace rather than a roof, as shown in Jacques Le Lieur's Livre des Fontaines. A roof was added between 1682 and 1691.

=== West wing ===
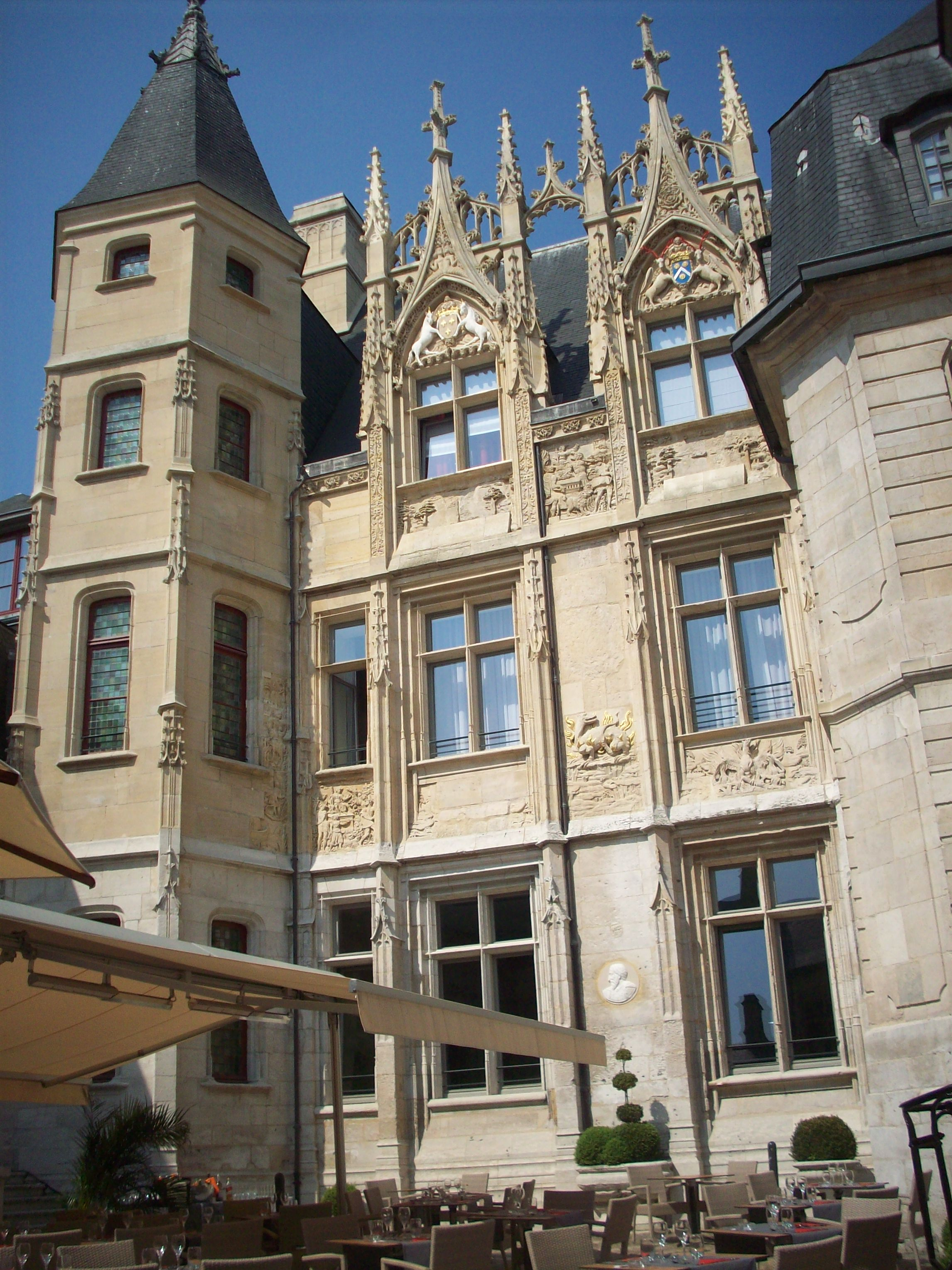
Louis XII style façade in the main courtyard.

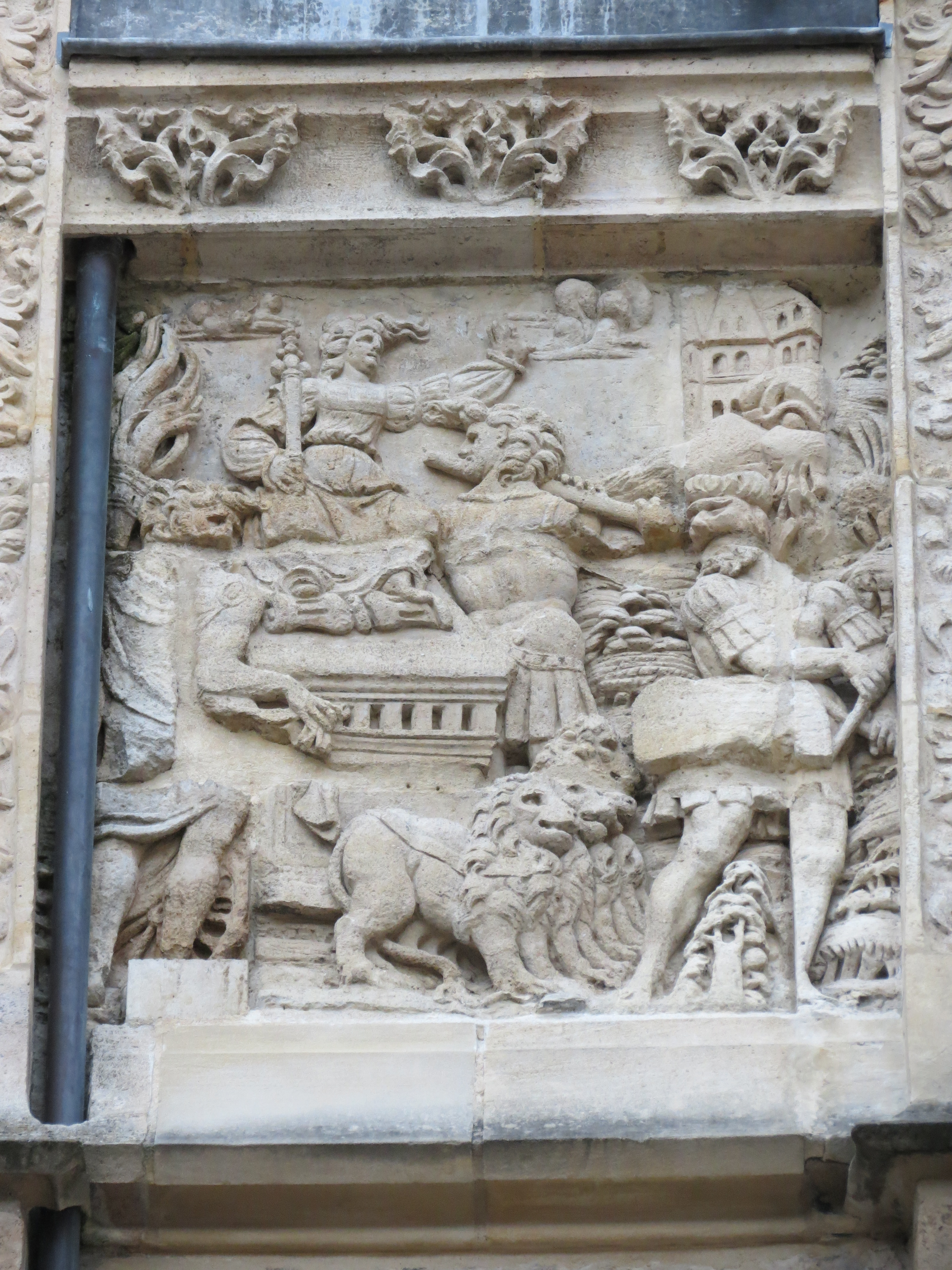
Allegorical scene from Triumphs - Cybele?

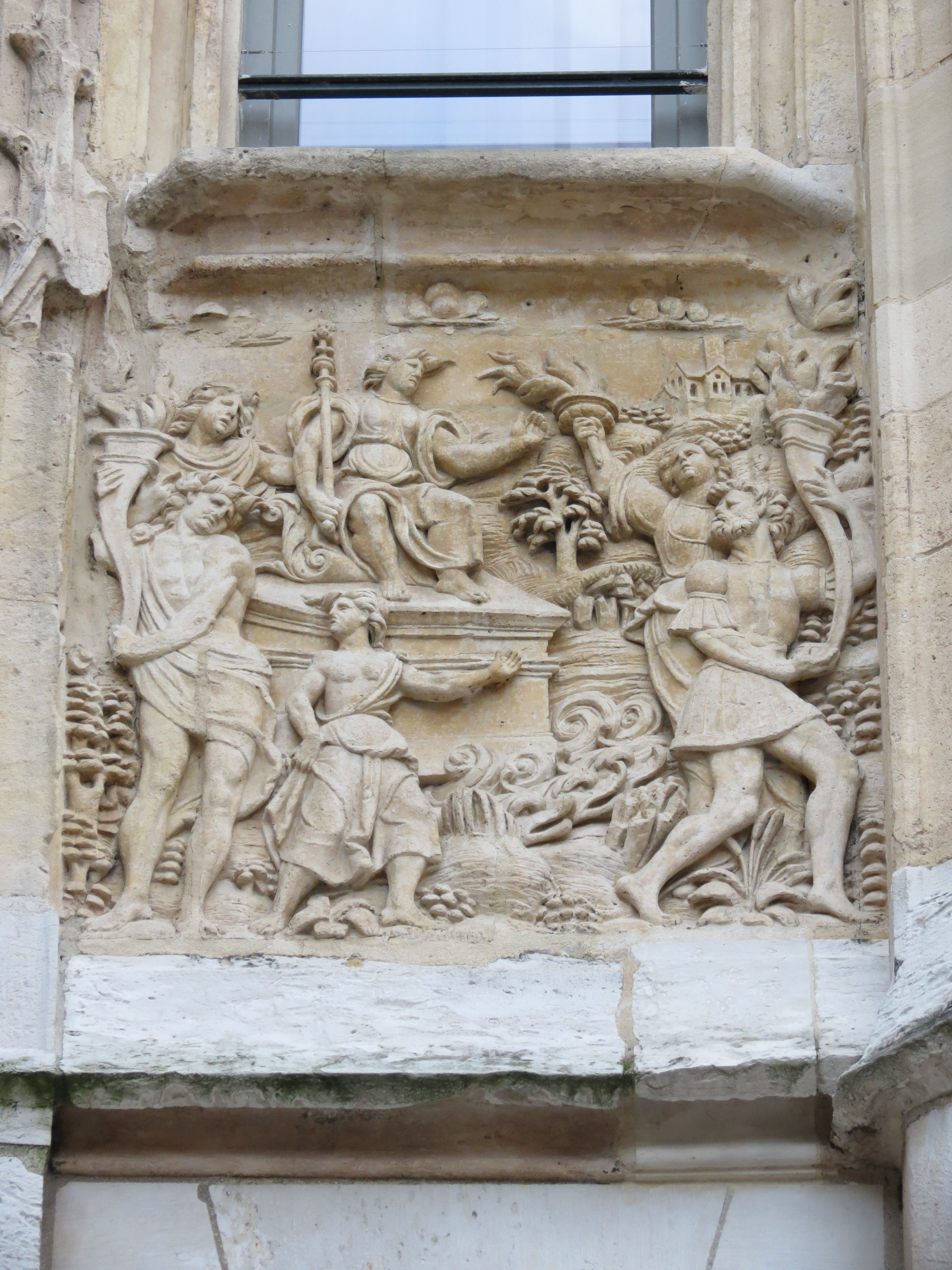
Allegorical scene from Triumphs - Cybele?

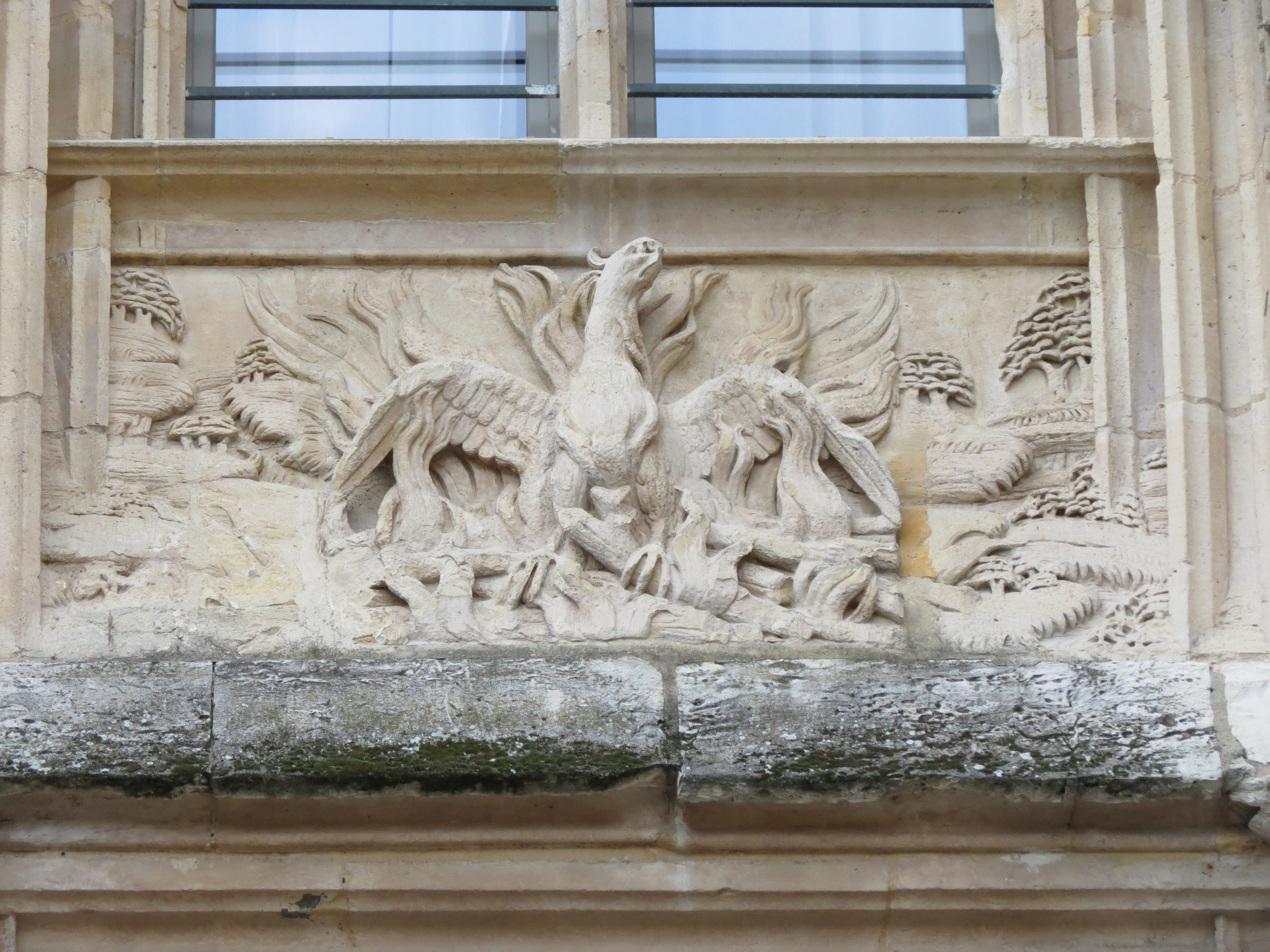
Phoenix, symbol of Eleanor of Austria, second wife of Francis I.

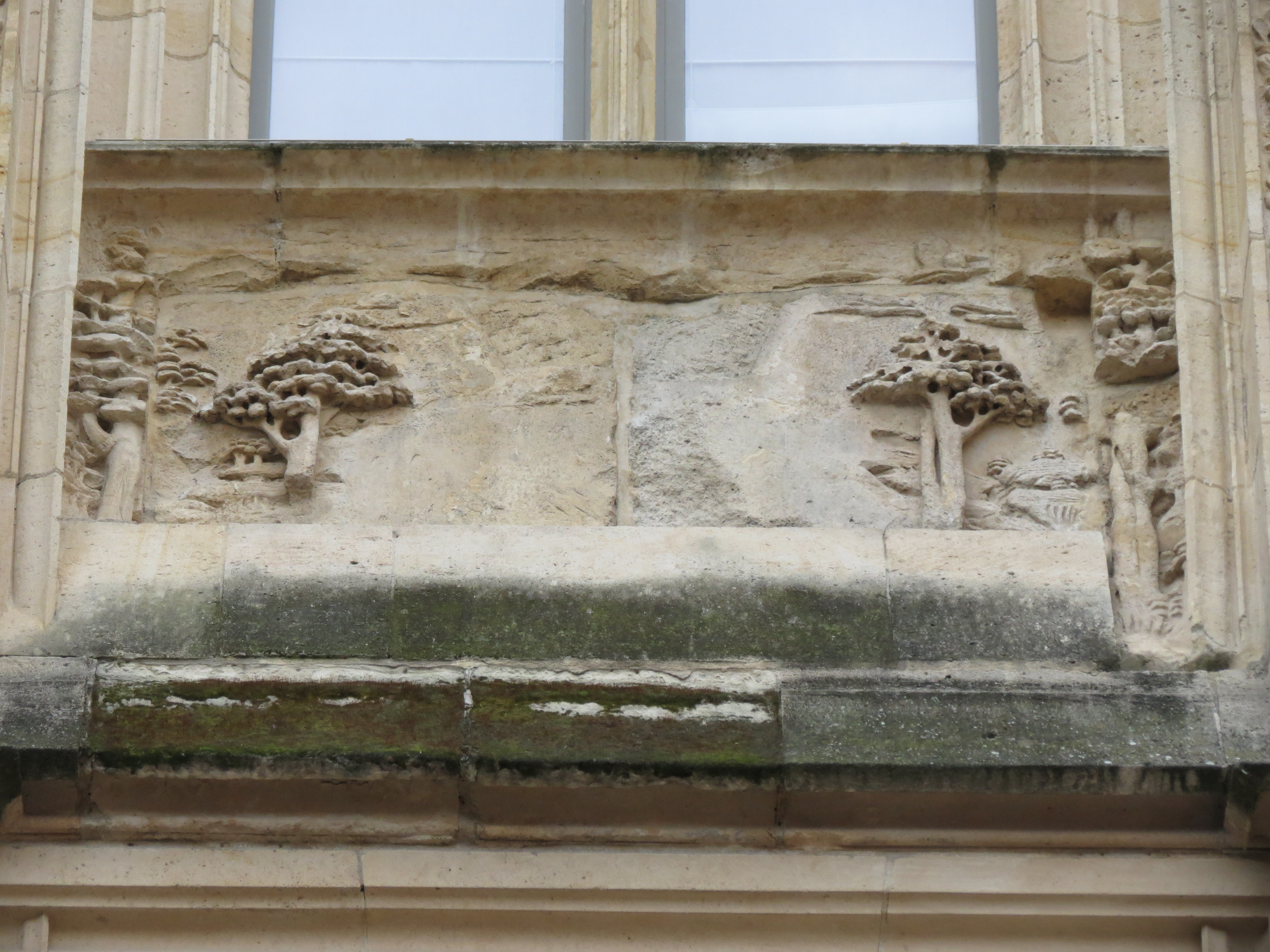
Pastoral relief, partly lost.

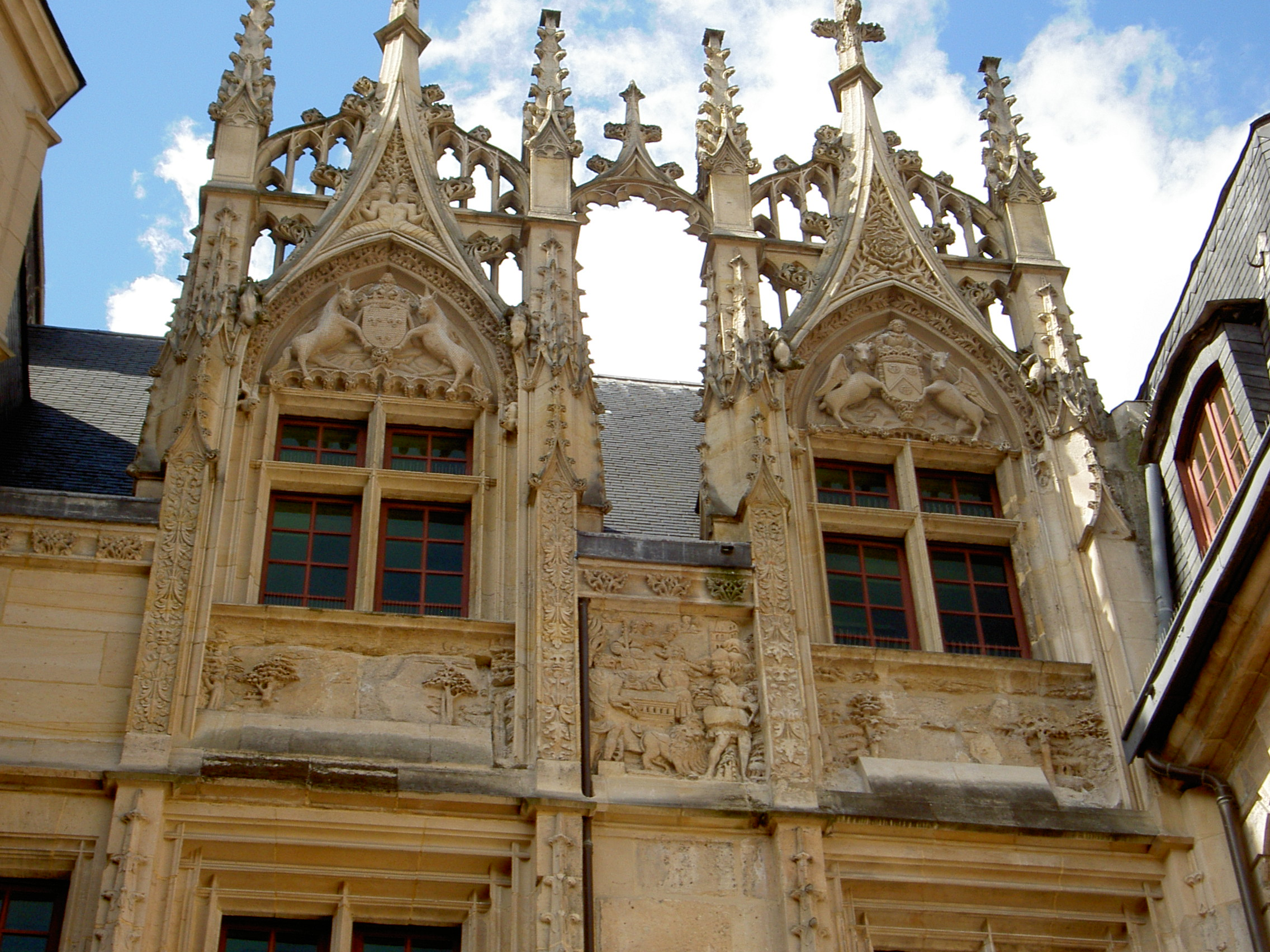
Relief of a scene from Triumphs and Louis XII style dormers, merging Flamboyant Gothic and early French Renaissance pinnacles with rinceaus.

The 'logis' is made up of two perpendicular wings. The west wing has largely survived as built. It was fortified with two turrets, but only the south one survives, albeit in reconstructed form after the Second World War - the north one was not rebuilt after the 1770 fire and was replaced with a neoclassical section with a mansard roof. The wing had a chapel on the first floor.

Marking a new stage in architecture compared to Rouen's courthouse, its main elevation in Louis XII style still kept late Gothic elements (arches, pinnacles, basket-handle arches) and mullion windows, already with motifs unknown in the Middle Ages, namely Lombard-influenced rinceaux. It has two floors over a cellar, topped with a roof and two large dormer windows with Flamboyant Gothic gables, with shapes marking the early French Renaissance style. A sort of clerestory with arcades or small flying buttresses links the pediment to two flanking pinnacles. Typically for the Louis XII style, the wide windows conveys a sense of luxury.

=== South wing - the Aumale Gallery ===
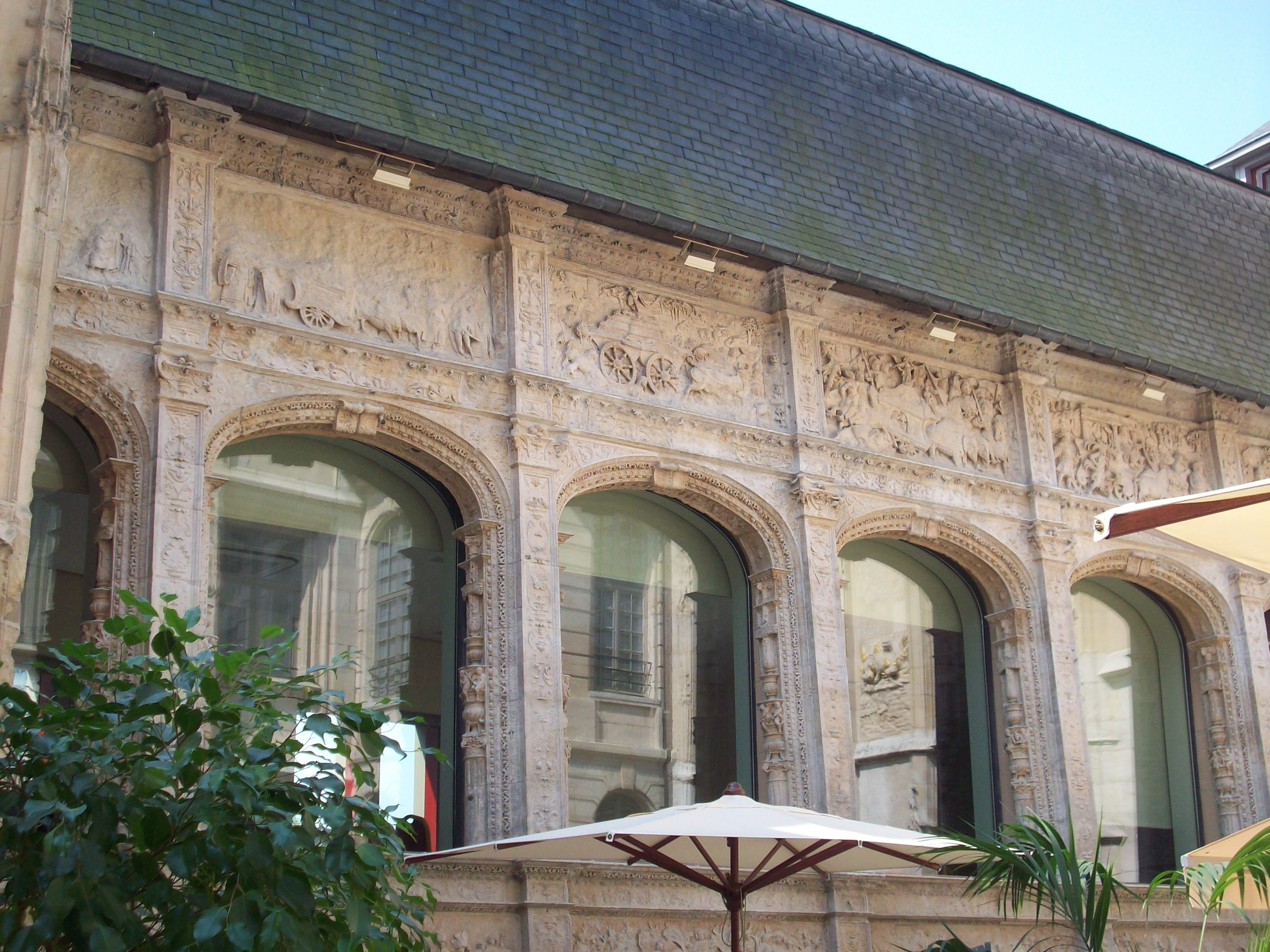

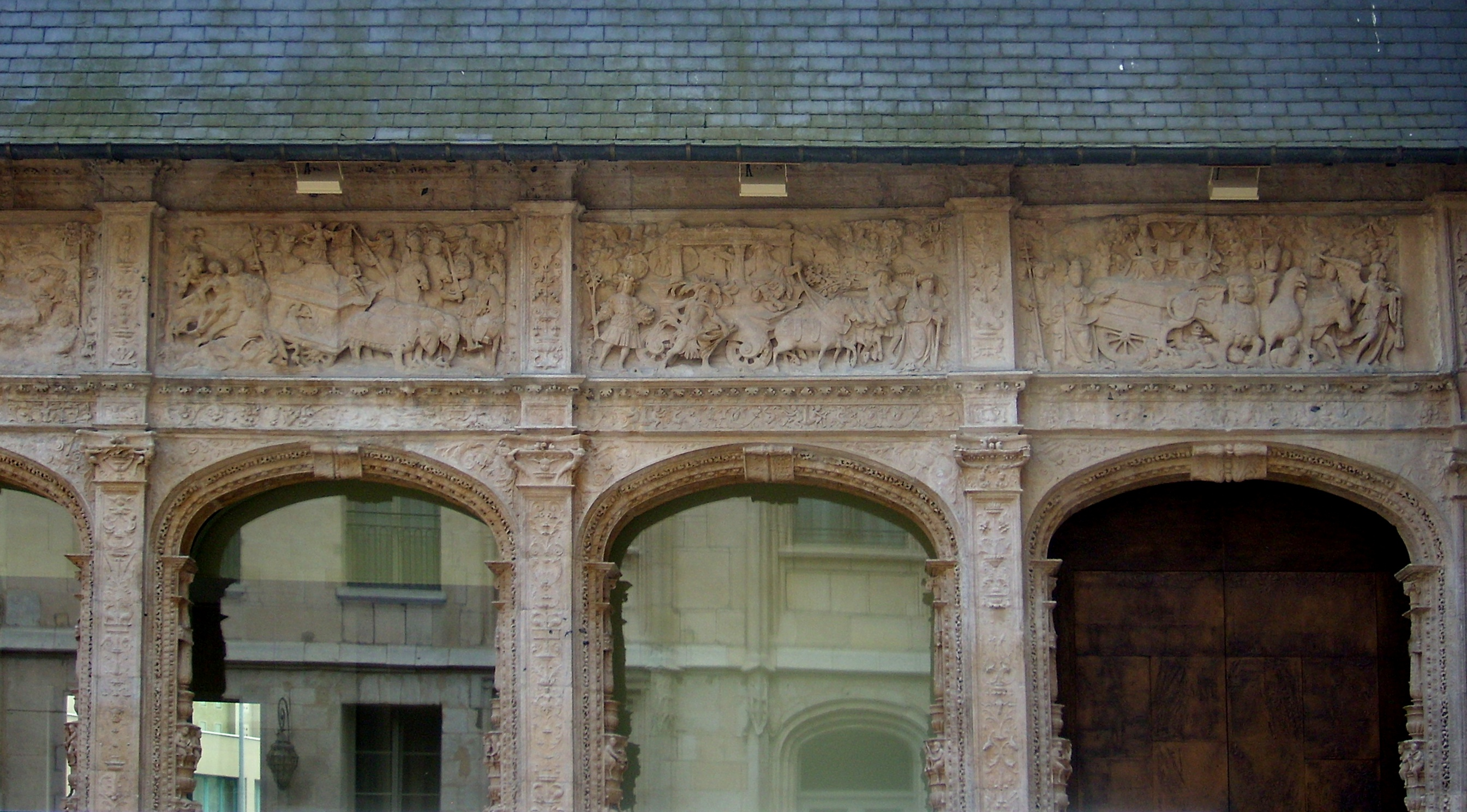

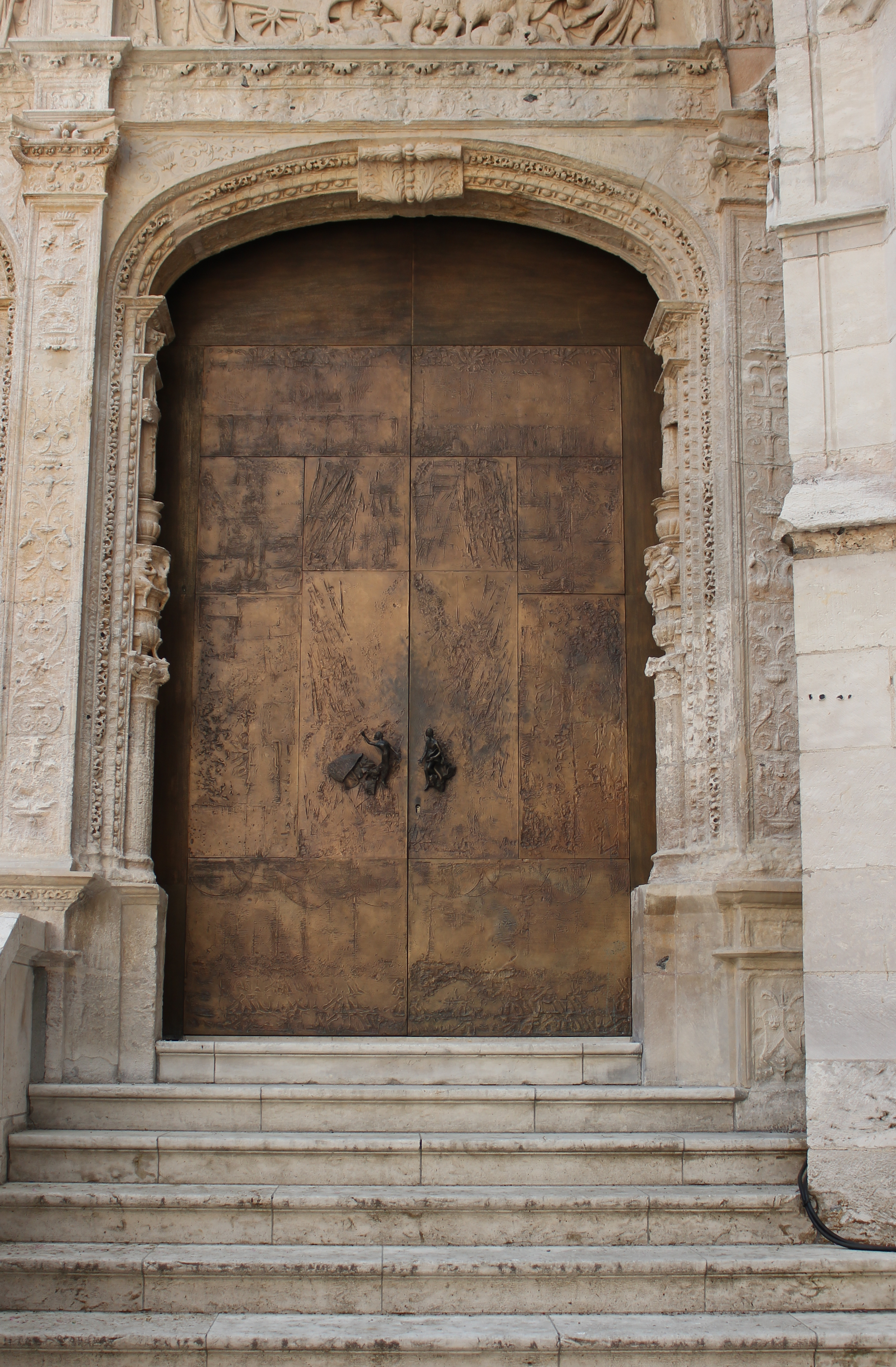

The most spectacular part of the hotel, it is built as a loggia and marks the start of the French Renaissance in Rouen. Most hôtels particuliers of that era had such galleries, linking the 'logis' to the outbuildings. It has no windows. Below are the stables and carriage houses, opening towards the south, on rue du Panneret.

It was built by Guillaume III, who was the abbé of Aumale, hence the Gallery's name. The arcades have columns with candelabra typical of the Renaissance style in Rouen. It is completely covered in sculpted limestone bas-reliefs, with five panels at the bottom showing the meeting on the Field of the Cloth of Gold (meaning the Gallery cannot predate 1520) and six at the top inspired by Petrarch's Triumphs (two of which are very badly damaged).

Reliefs of the Meeting on the Field of the Cloth of Gold.
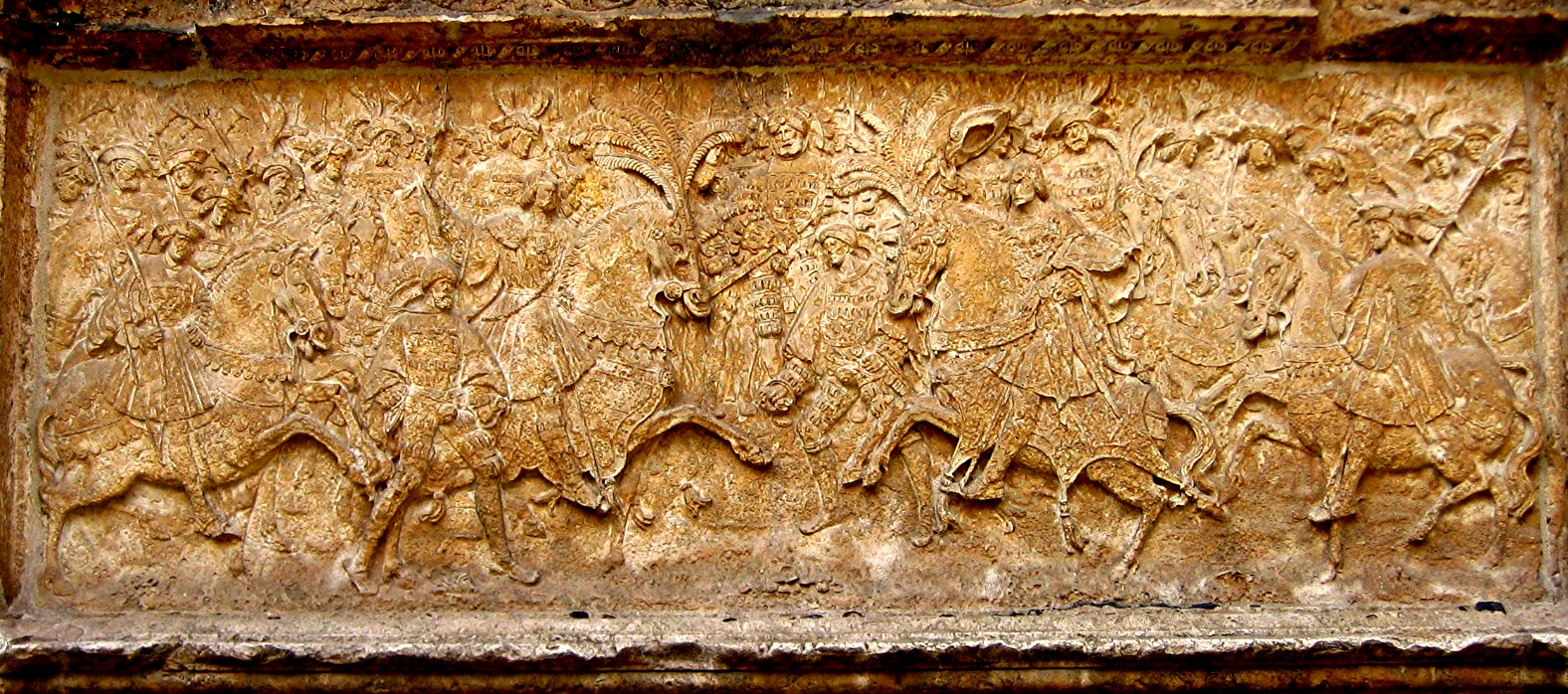

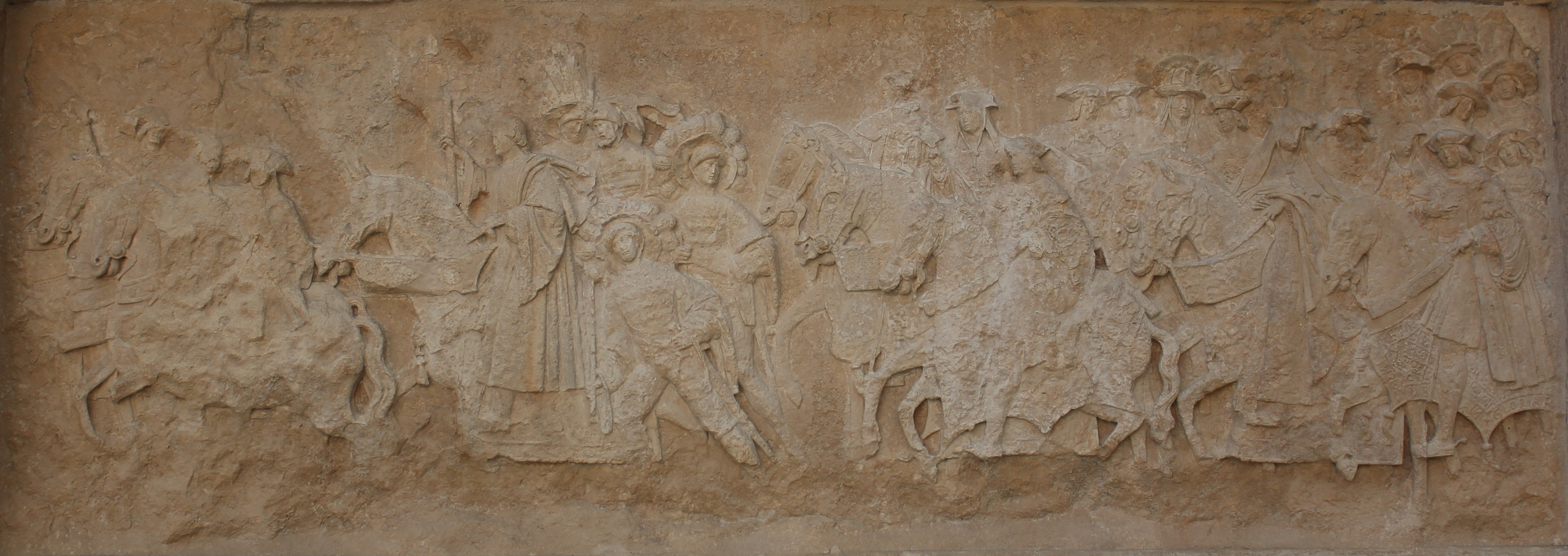

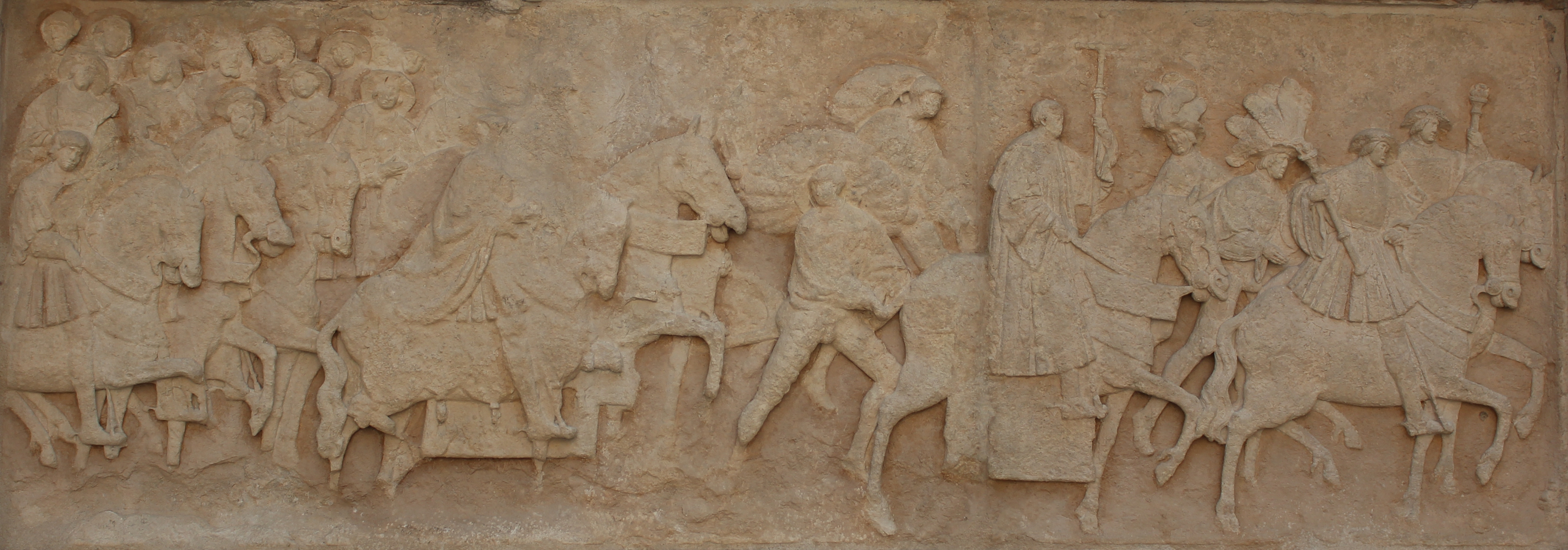

=== North wing ===
This 'logis' wing was completely rebuilt around 1682, then transformed after the 1770 fire.

== Lost decoration recorded by Eustache-Hyacinthe Langlois ==
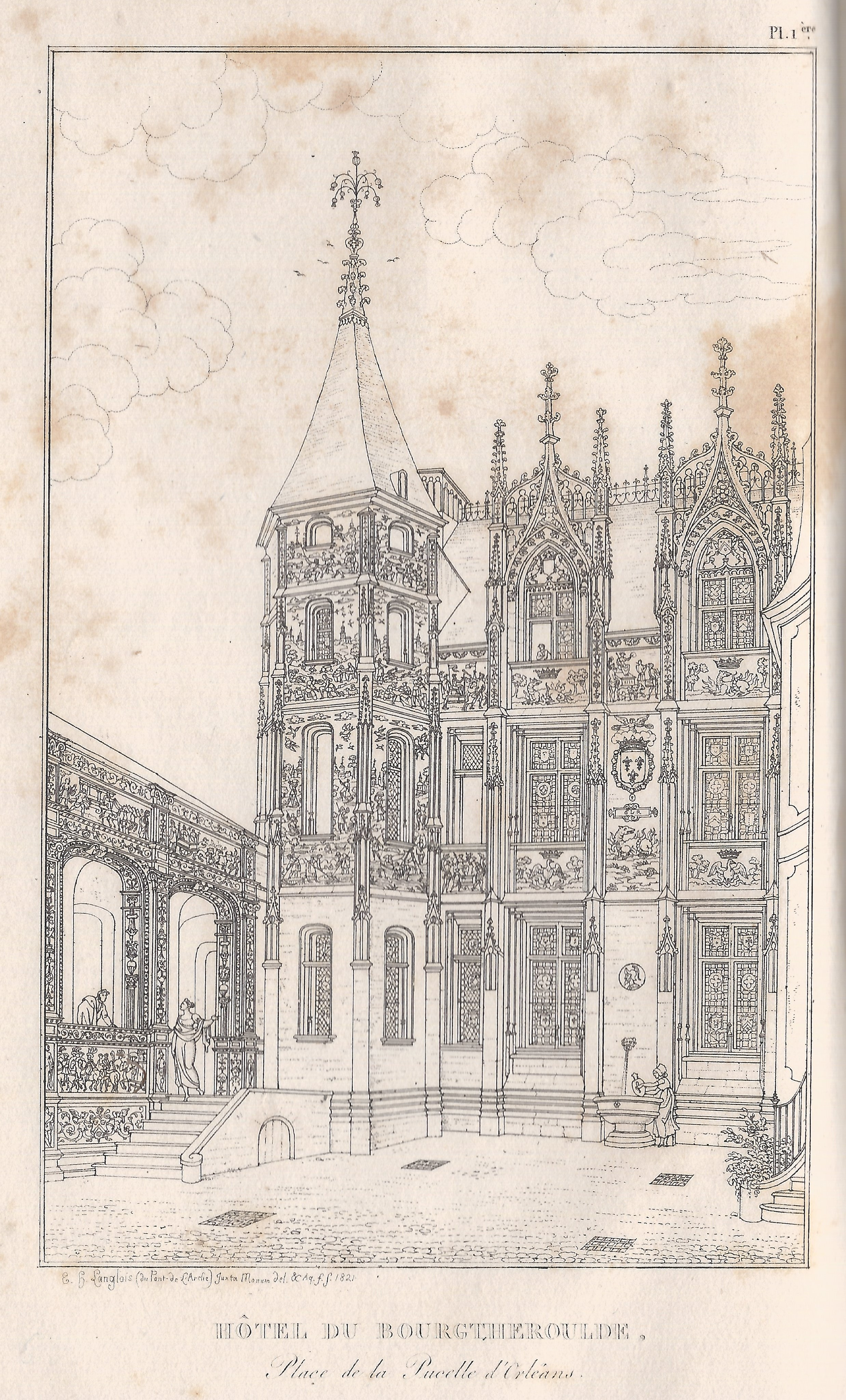

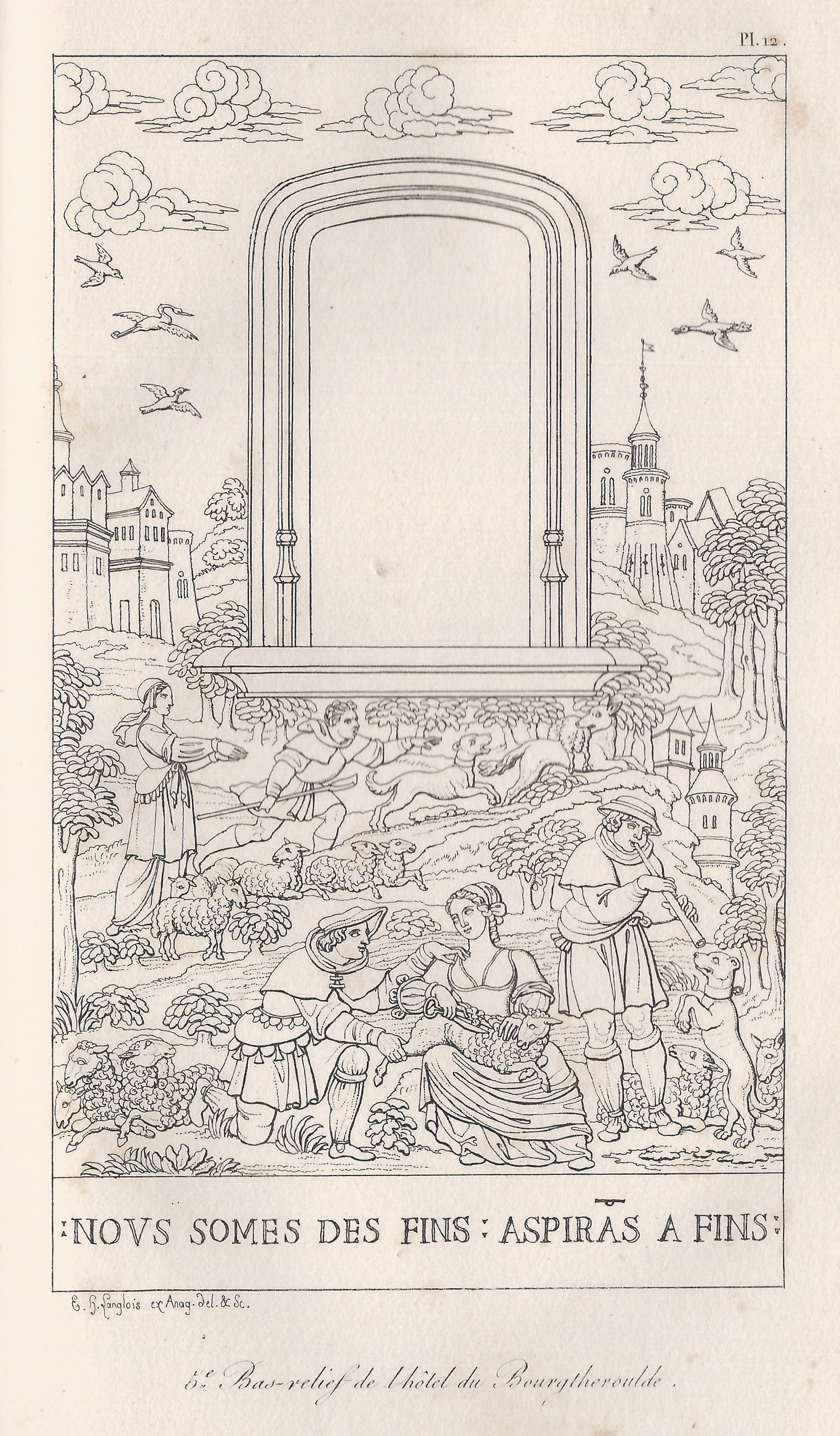

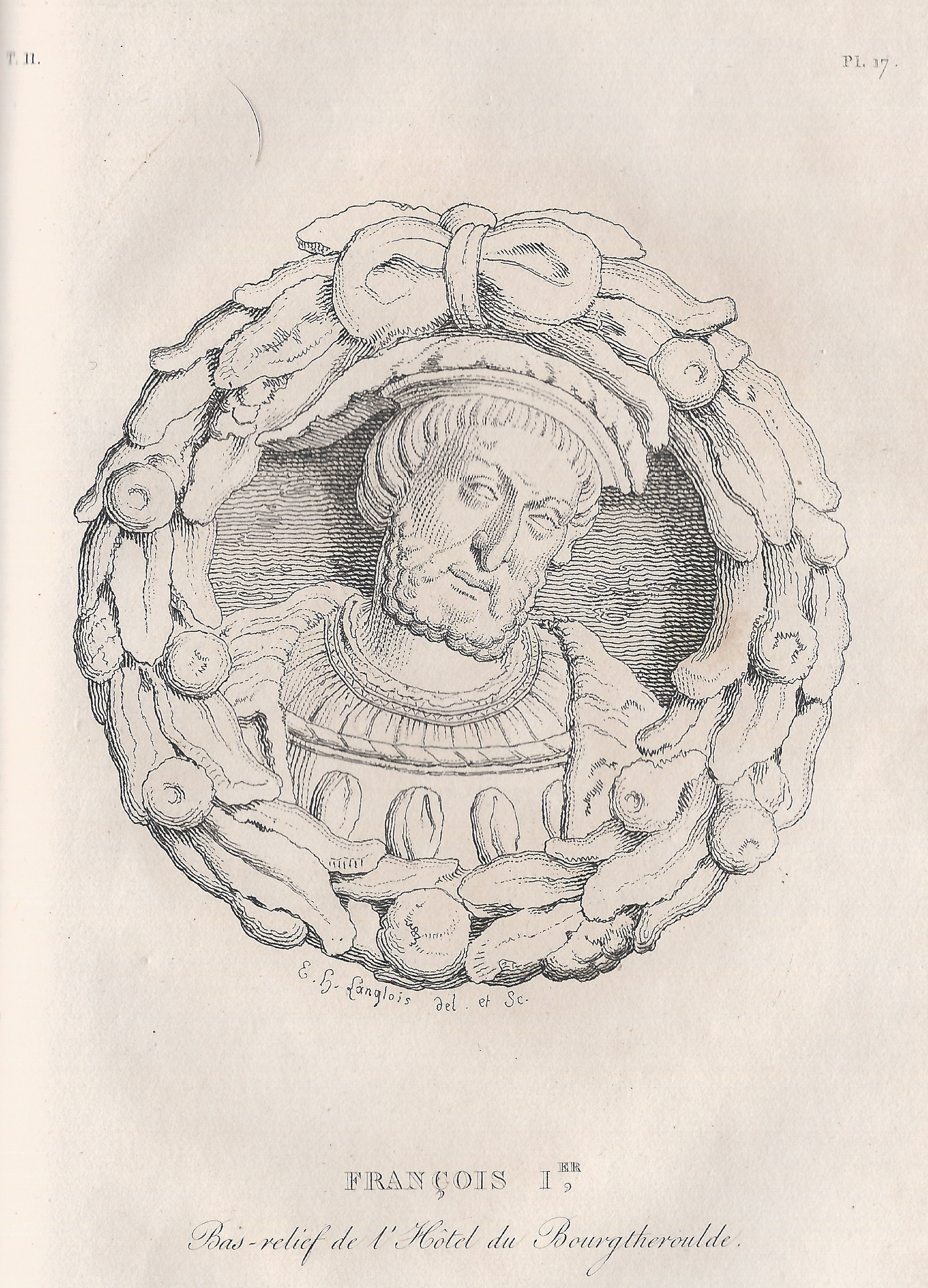

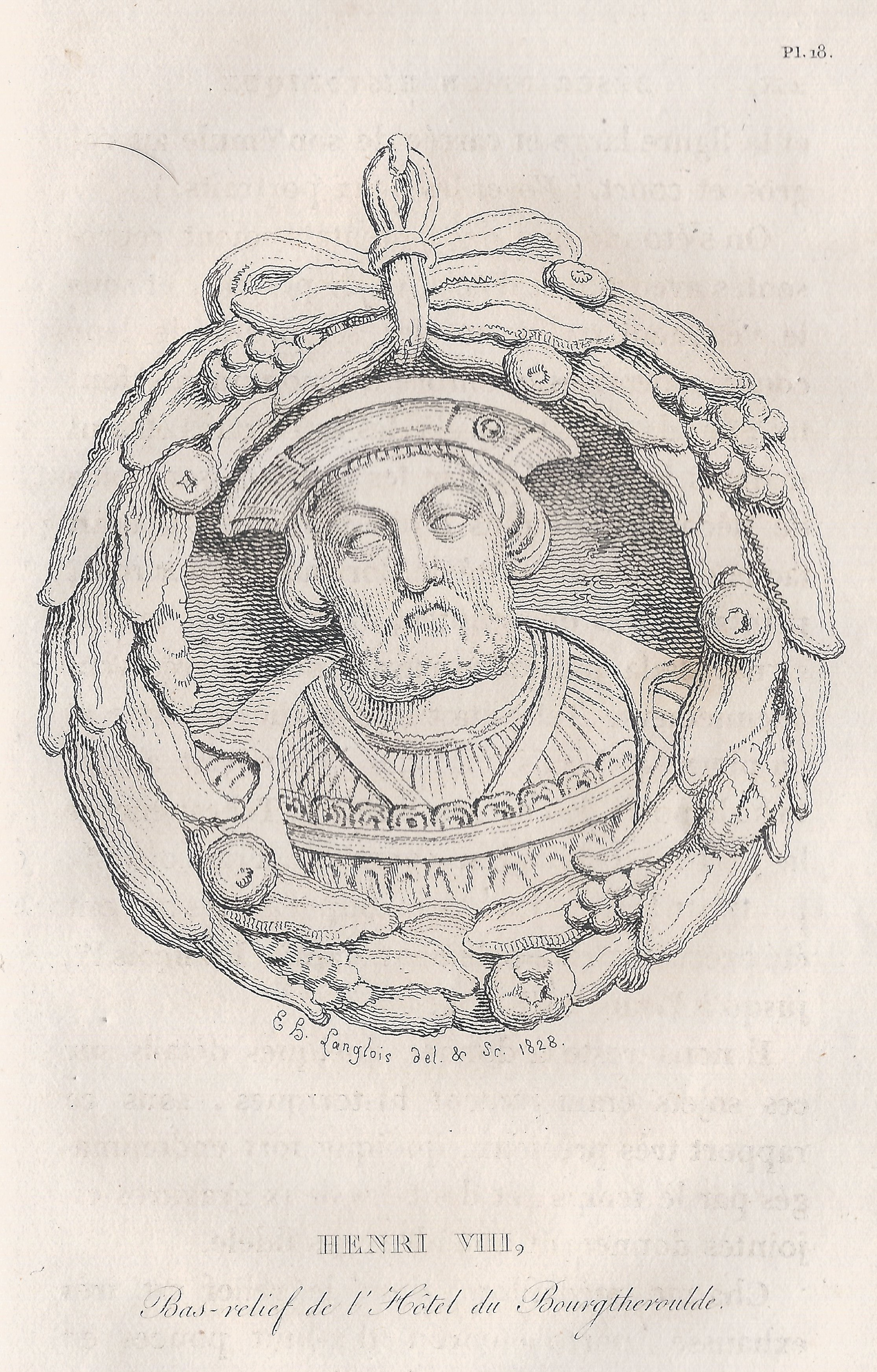

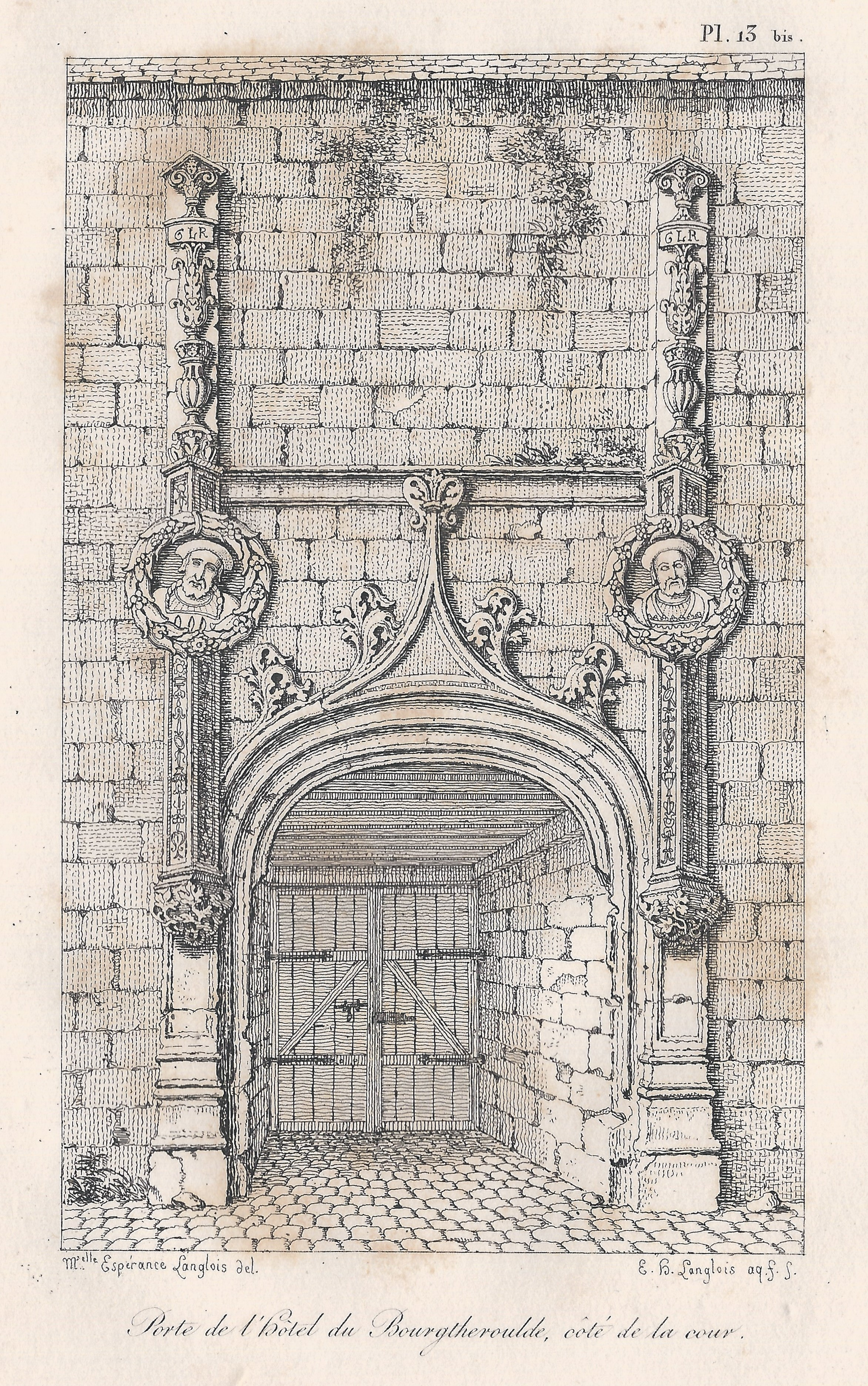

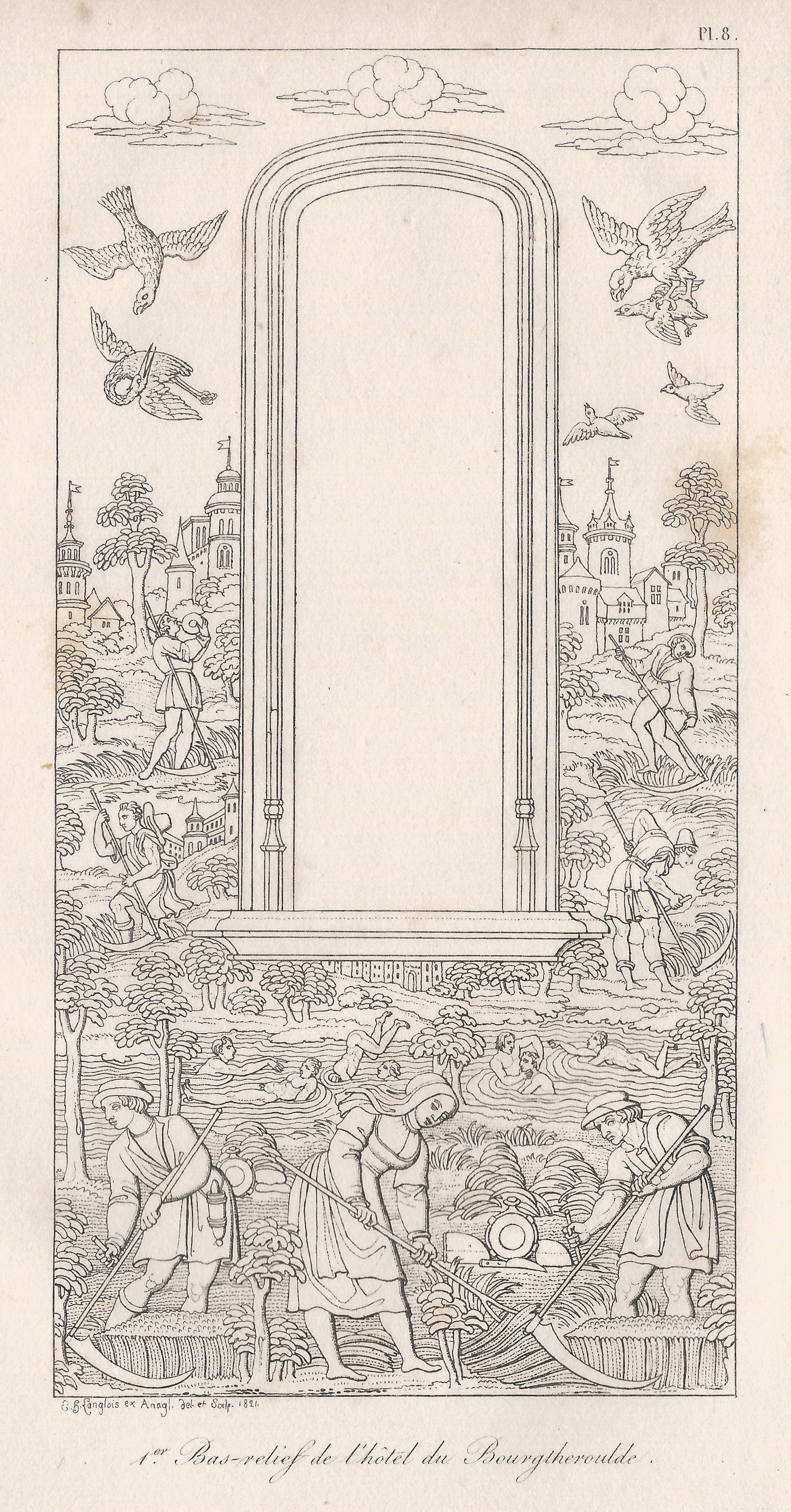

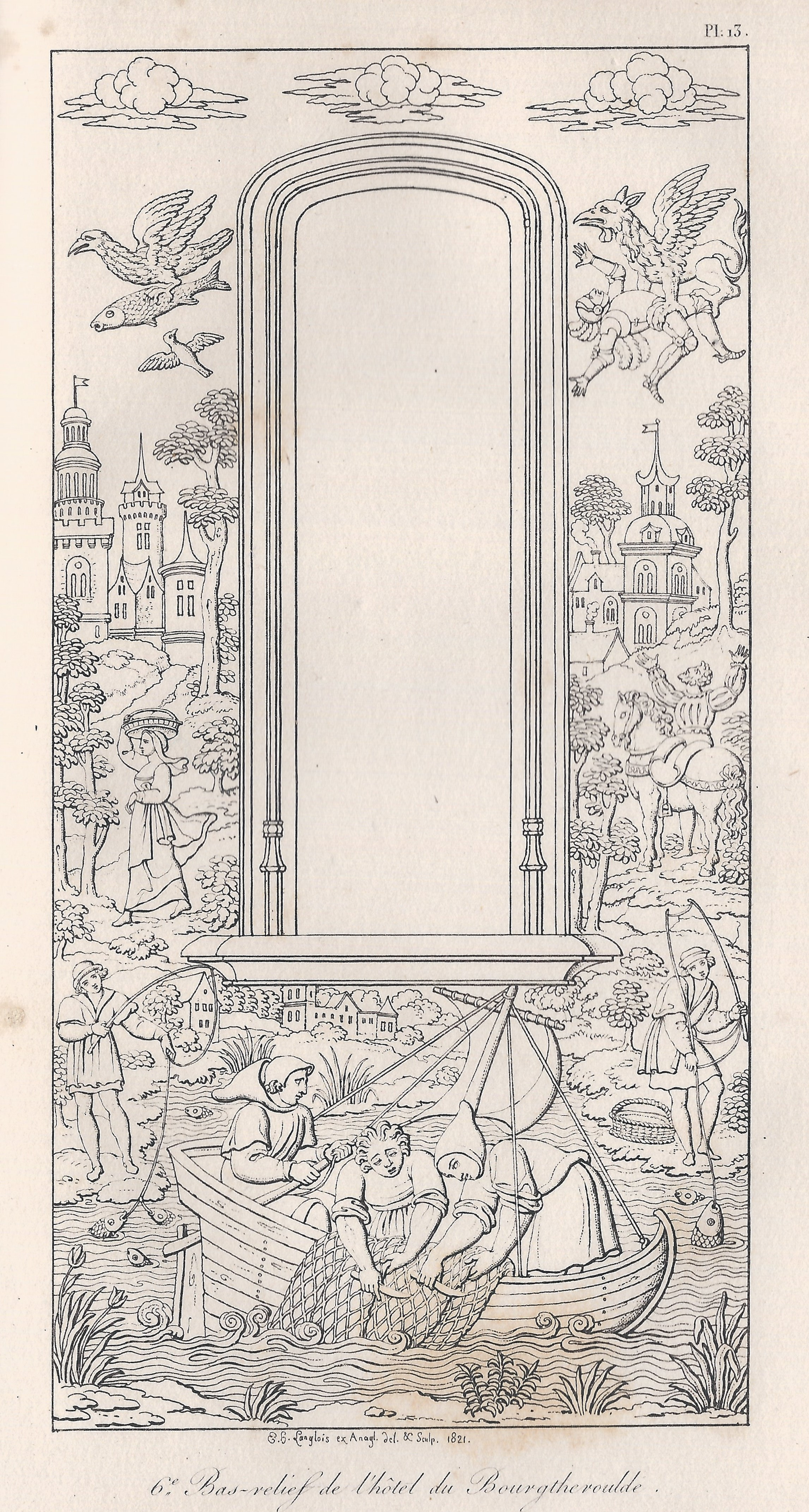

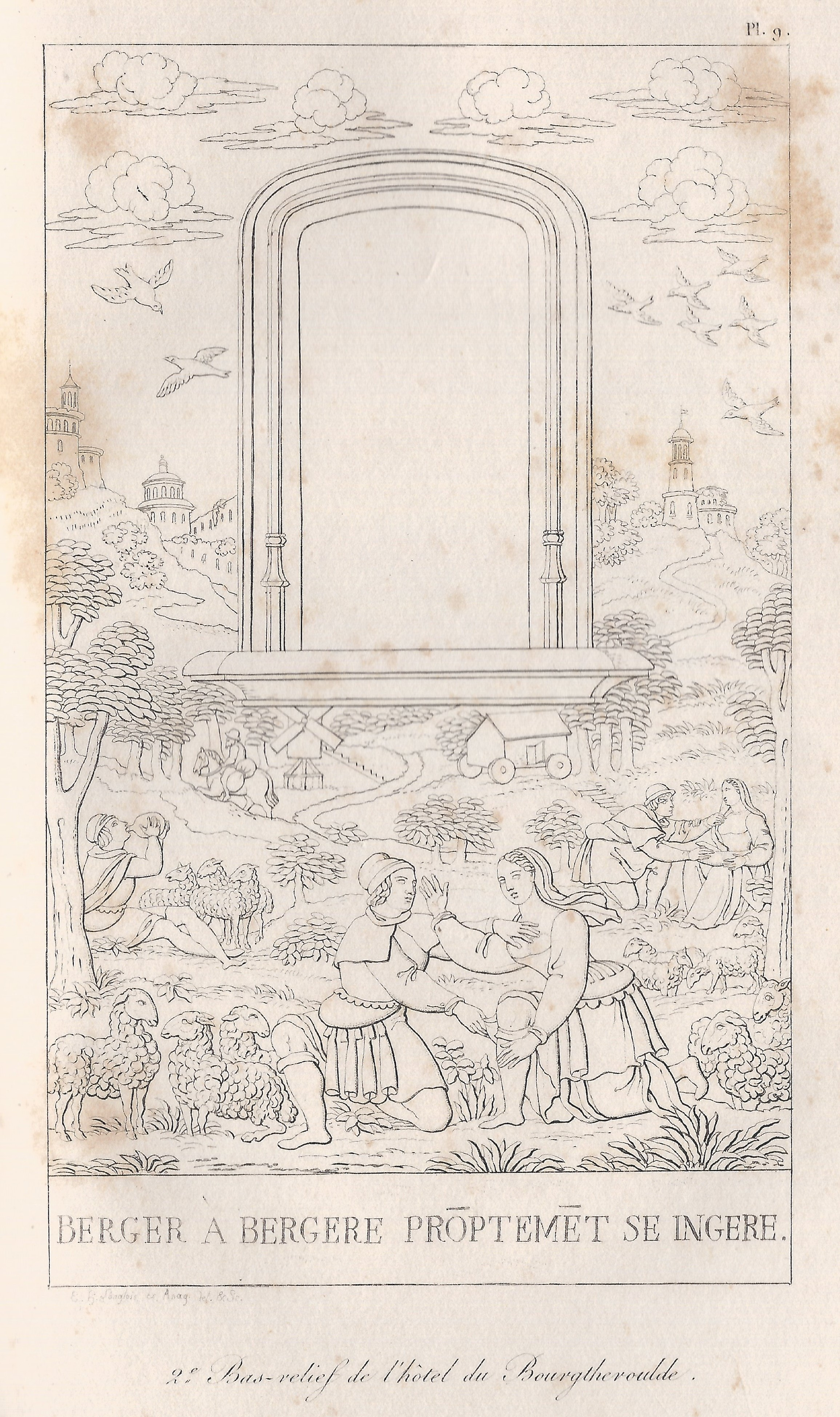

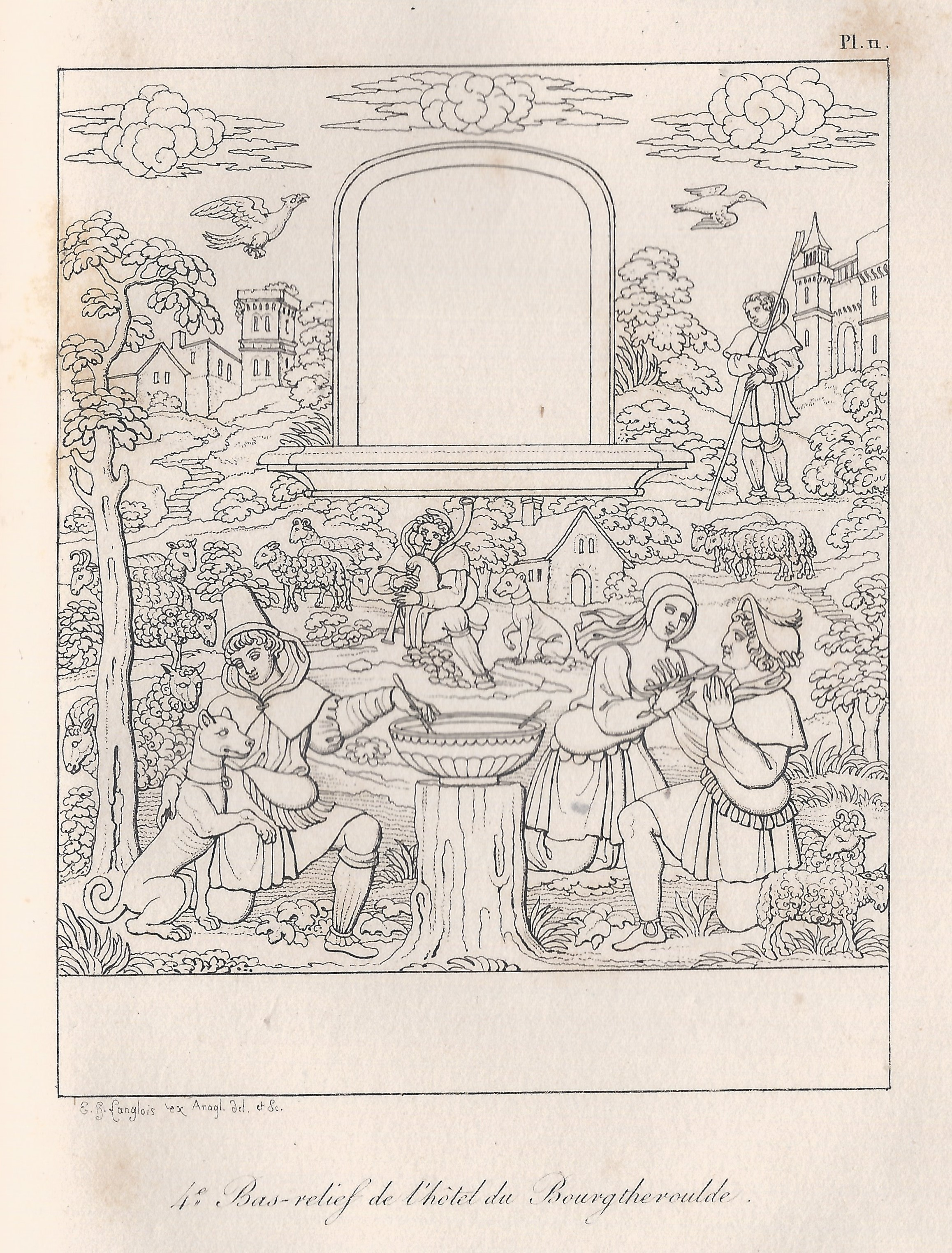

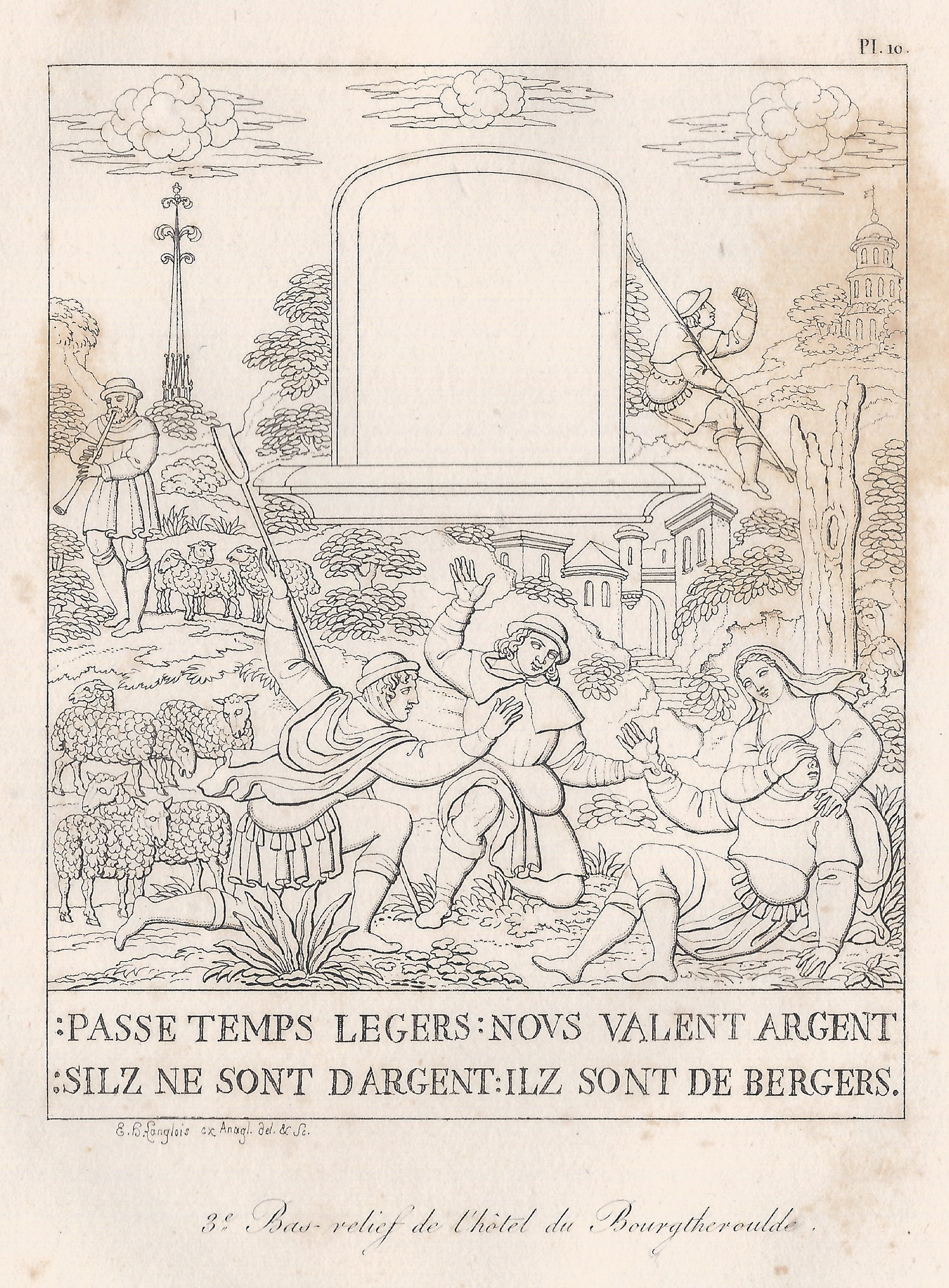

== Bibliography (in French) ==
- Actes du premier colloque international de l'association verre et histoire Paris-La Défense/ Versailles, 13-15 octobre 2005. Intervention de Sophie Lagabrielle, conservateur en chef, Musée du Moyen Âge, Paris.
- Jules Adeline, L'Hôtel du Bourgtheroulde, in La Normandie monumentale et pittoresque, Seine-Inférieure, 1893, Le Havre, Lemale et Cie, imprimeurs, éditeurs, p.33-36.
- Olivier Chaline, ed. (2002). Les Hôtels particuliers de Rouen (in French). Rouen: Société des Amis des monuments rouennais. p. 189-193. ISBN 978-2-9509804-9-6. OCLC 469254974..
- Robert Ducher (photographs by Pierre Devinoy), Caractéristiques des styles, Paris, Flammarion Éditeur, 1963, 410 pages ISBN 9782080113597.
- Isabelle Lettéron, Rouen : l'Hôtel de Bourgtheroulde et sa galerie, Connaissance du patrimoine de Haute-Normandie, 1992 (Itinéraires du patrimoine, ISSN 1159-1722) ISBN 2-9506014-3-X.
- Isabelle Lettéron and Delphine Gillot, Rouen, l'Hôtel de Bourgtheroulde, demeure des Le Roux, Connaissance du patrimoine, no. 44, Rouen, 1996 ISBN 2-910316-09-2.
- Stéphane Nappez, L'Hôtel de Bourgtheroulde : du camp du Drap d'or au siège du CIN, éd. PTC, 2004.
- Yvon Pailhès (1994). Rouen : un passé toujours présent…: rues, monuments, jardins, personnages (in French). Luneray: Bertout. p. 114-115. ISBN 978-2-86743-219-4. OCLC 466680895..
- Léon Palustre (ed.), L'architecture de la Renaissance, Paris, 7 rue Saint-Benoît, ancienne maison Quentin, Libraires-Imprimerie réunies, 1892 ISBN 9781508701187.
- Guy Pessiot, Histoire de Rouen 1850-1900, du P'tit Normand, 1983, p. 204-205, Sur la restauration de la façade en 1899.
- Paul Rouaix, Histoire des beaux arts Moyen Âge renaissance, Paris, Librairie Renouard, Henri Laurens., 1906, 194 p.
- Eugène Viollet-le-Duc, Dictionnaire raisonné de l’architecture française du XI-XVI siecles, vol. 1, Paris, rue Mignon, Imprimerie de E. Martinet, 1854-1868 ISBN 9783849135973.

== External links (in French) ==
- The hôtel de Bourgtheroulde on Rouen-Histoire
- Rouen - Hôtel de Bourgtheroulde
- Eustache-Hyacinthe Langlois [archive] on base joconde [archive]
