= Gilles de Rais =

Medieval French nobleman and convicted serial killer

Marshal of France Gilles de Rais Baron de Rais
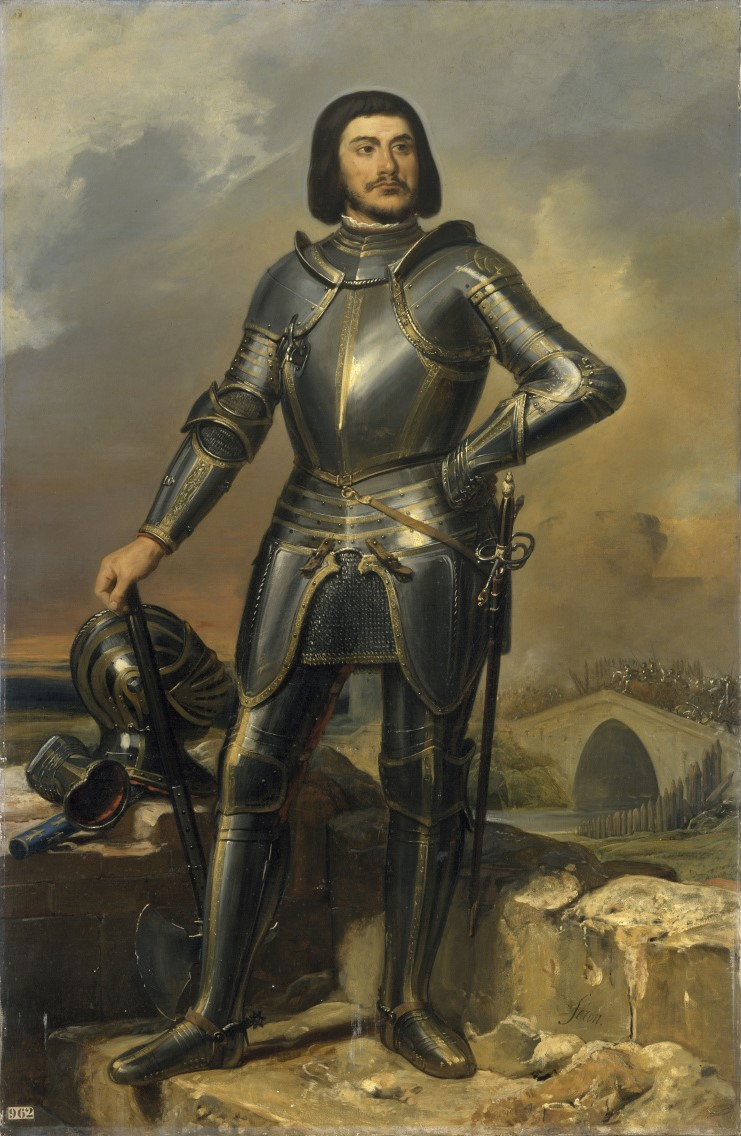
- Imaginary portrait of Gilles de Rais by Éloi Firmin Féron, 1835. No contemporary portrait or physical description of him survives. The painting was commissioned by the July Monarchy for the Gallery of French Marshals at the Musée de l'Histoire de France, Versailles.
- Born: c. 1405 ? Champtocé-sur-Loire, Anjou
- Died: 26 October 1440; Nantes, Brittany
- Burial place: Church Monastery of Notre-Dame des Carmes, Nantes
- Military career
- Allegiance: Duchy of Brittany; Kingdom of France
- Service years: 1427 (or 1420 ?) – 1435
- Rank: Marshal of France
- Conflicts: Hundred Years' War; Siege of Orléans; Battle of Jargeau; Battle of Patay

Criminal details
- Target: Mainly young boys
- Victims: Unknown (approx. 140 ?)
- Period: 1432–1440
- Penalty: Death by hanging (corpse partially burned at the stake)

Signature
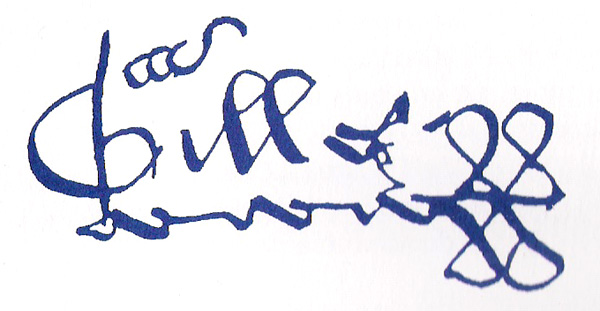

Gilles de Rais, Baron de Rais (French: [ʒil də ʁɛ]; also spelled "Retz"; c. 1405 – 26 October 1440) was a French knight and lord whose estates extended across Brittany, Anjou and Poitou. He served as one of the captains of the French royal army during the Hundred Years' War and took part in the same campaigns as Joan of Arc in 1429, ending with the failed siege of Paris. Little is known about the nature of his relationship with the Maid of Orléans, despite fictional portrayals that depict them as close companions. He is best known for his conviction for the rape and murder of numerous children.

As heir to several major noble houses of western France, Gilles de Rais became a powerful lord and supported Charles VII. In April 1429, he entered into an alliance with his cousin Georges de La Trémoille, the Grand Chamberlain of France. Later that year, he was appointed Marshal of France. He gradually withdrew from military affairs during the 1430s. His family accused him of squandering his inheritance through extravagant spending, and in July 1435 Charles VII placed his lands under royal interdict. In May 1440, Gilles de Rais assaulted a senior cleric at the church of Saint-Étienne-de-Mer-Morte and seized the neighbouring castle, violating ecclesiastical immunity and defying his overlord, John V, Duke of Brittany. Arrested in September, he was tried the following month before both ducal and ecclesiastical courts on charges of heresy, sodomy and child murder. He was executed on 26 October 1440.

Since the early 19th century, Gilles de Rais has often been associated with the fairy-tale character Bluebeard, although the hypothesis that his life inspired Charles Perrault's 1697 tale remains speculative. From the late 19th century onward, his case has been reinterpreted through successive criminological and psychiatric approaches, including sexual sadism and serial murder. Some scholars caution against applying modern diagnostic categories to a 15th-century figure.

Although the validity of his conviction has occasionally been questioned, most professional historians reject claims of his innocence. The detailed witness testimony concerning missing children continues to be regarded as significant, while some of his servants' confessions, though reinterpreted in light of inquisitorial procedure, have no parallel in inquisitorial testimony.

== Ancestry ==
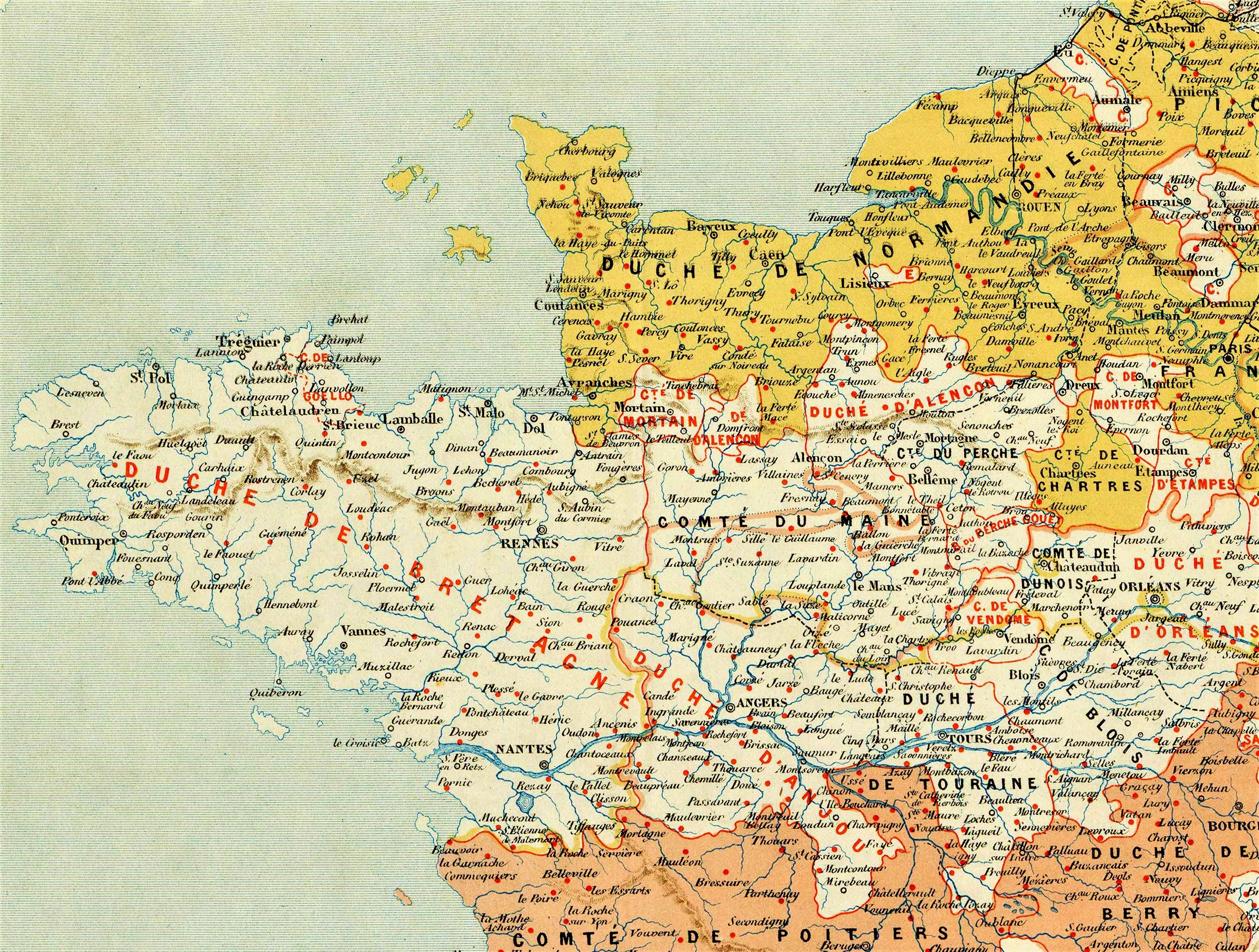
Detail of a map of the Kingdom of France in 1429–1430 showing the Duchy of Brittany and its neighboring territories, by Auguste Longnon (Paris: Bibliothèque nationale de France, 1875)

In the aftermath of the Breton Civil War (1341–1365), the Duchy of Brittany remained formally a fief of the French Crown, but in many respects operated as a semi-independent principality, with its own institutions, taxation, currency, army, and diplomatic representation.

Within this political order, the Barons of Retz (whose name appears in medieval sources as Rais, Rays, or Raiz) were among the leading vassals of the dukes of Brittany, while also maintaining close ties to the French royal court. The barony of Retz, one of the duchy's largest and most prestigious lay lordships, served as a significant counterweight to ducal authority. The lordship was centered on the Château de Machecoul, on Brittany's southern frontier, south of the Loire. This border position generated substantial revenues for the barony and gave it considerable strategic importance.

Coat of arms of the barony of Retz (Or, a cross Sable)

The House of Retz became extinct in the male line in 1371 with the death of Girard V Chabot. The barony of Retz passed to his sister, Jeanne Chabot, known as la Sage (the Wise). Seeking to expand the ducal demesne and secure control of the lands south of the Loire, Duke John IV of Brittany laid claim to her inheritance. In response, King Charles V of France entrusted the protection of the lands of Jeanne Chabot, Dame de Rais, to her kinsman Guy "Brumor" de Laval. (Note: Guy "Brumor" de Laval was descended from the Chabot family through his mother, Jeanne Chabot, known as "the Mad". In his second marriage, he married Tiphaine Husson, the daughter of Clémence du Guesclin, who was the sister of the renowned Constable of France, Bertrand du Guesclin. Through the marriage of his paternal grandfather, Gilles de Rais was therefore the great-grandnephew of Bertrand du Guesclin.)

After Guy Brumor's death (at an unknown date after 1375), attempts to reach an amicable settlement between Jeanne Chabot and Duke John IV failed. The duke then demanded that she cede her estates to him. When she refused, he sent troops to occupy the barony’s principal strongholds. The ensuing protracted legal proceedings were temporarily suspended under pressure from the Royal Council and eventually led to a compromise that restored Jeanne Chabot to possession of her lands. Faced with mounting military and political difficulties, John IV accepted the settlement in order to ease tensions with the Breton nobility and secure the succession of his son, the future Duke John V. The agreement was finalized in 1400, shortly after John IV's death on 1 November 1399.

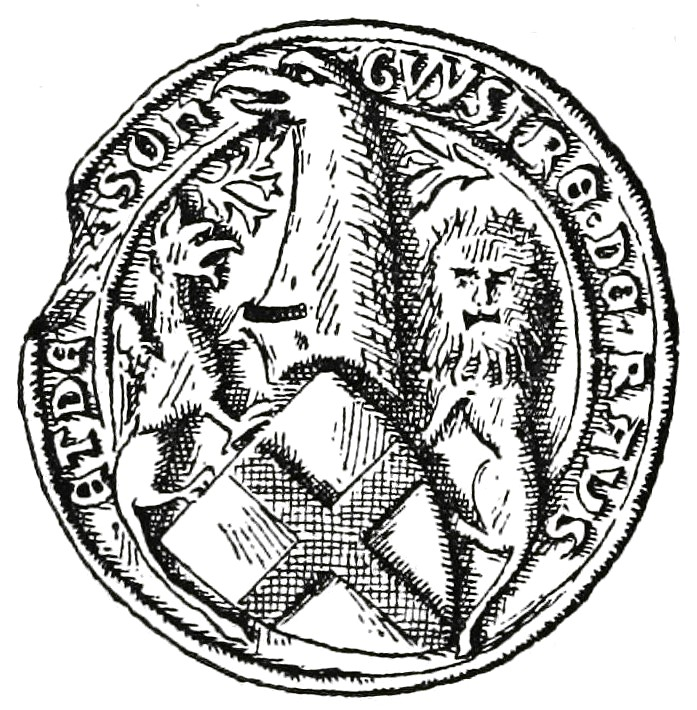
Seal of Guy, Sire de Rais (father of Gilles de Rais), bearing the arms of the barony of Retz, c. 1405-1407

Having no children, Jeanne Chabot named Guy de Laval, the son of Guy Brumor, as her heir in 1401, on condition that he adopt the name and arms of Retz. She later revoked this decision in favor of another relative, Jean de Craon, seigneur de La Suze and Champtocé. The ensuing succession dispute ended in a compromise between Guy de Laval and Jean de Craon, sealed by a planned marriage between Guy and Jean de Craon's daughter, Marie. The Parlement of Paris ratified the settlement in 1404. Later that year, Jeanne Chabot transferred several lordships to Guy de Laval in exchange for a life annuity. Guy de Laval and Marie de Craon were probably married after these arrangements had been completed. Guy thereafter assumed the title of Sire de Rais. (Note: Fourteenth- and fifteenth-century sources use the term baronnie ("barony") but not baron. Instead, the holder of a barony is then referred to as a sire or seigneur.) The couple settled at the Château de Machecoul, where they lived with Jeanne Chabot until her death in 1407.

Gilles de Rais (or "Retz"), (Note: Archivist-paleographer Matei Cazacu uses the archaic spelling "Rais" for Gilles de Rais, as it is the form most commonly associated with the historical figure.) the eldest son of Marie de Craon and Guy de Rais, descended from several prominent feudal houses. Through his mother, he belonged to the House of Craon, a wealthy family of western France. Through his father, he belonged to the House of Laval, one of the two leading Breton lineages of the fifteenth century. The Laval family's earlier marriages had also allied it with the Barons of Retz, described as the "oldest barons of the Duchy of Brittany", and with the prestigious House of Montmorency.

== Biography ==
=== Early life ===
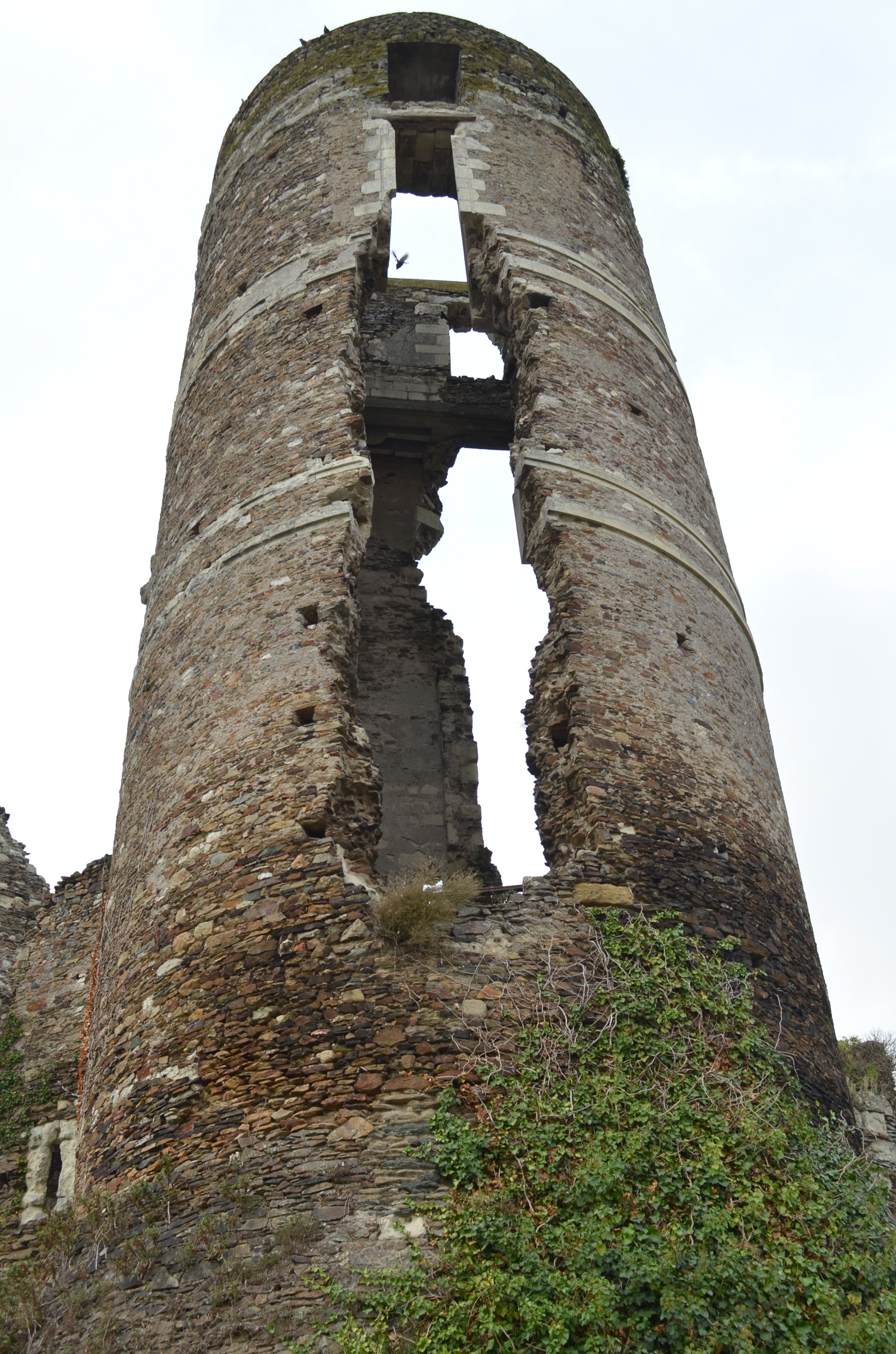
Champtocé castle tower ruins in Maine-et-Loire

Gilles de Rais was born "in a room called the Black Tower" at the Château de Champtocé, at an unknown date. His birth has been variably dated between 1396 and 1406, and more frequently towards the end of 1404. However, he was probably born not before 1405 given the delays caused by the legal procedures before the Parlement of Paris that conditioned his parents' marriage. (Note: In Louis Gabriel Michaud's Biographie universelle ancienne et moderne (1824), polygraph Pierre-Hyacinthe Audiffret (1773–1841) placed Gilles de Rais's birth around 1396. However, this stems from an incorrect reading of the memorandum drawn up by his heirs. Auguste Vallet de Viriville suggests that Gilles de Rais was born "probably in 1406". Abbé Eugène Bossard (1853–1905) relies on the Dominican friar Augustin du Paz, who dates the marriage of the parents to February 5, 1404. Based on the length of a pregnancy, Bossard then calculated that Gilles de Rais "probably came into the world around September or October of the same year". Dr. Jules Hébert, vice-president of the Academic Society of Brest, agreed with Bossard's interpretation, but expanded the time frame: "The birth of Gilles de Rays must therefore have taken place in the last months of 1404, or at the beginning of the following year, as no historian has given an exact date." In his article on Gilles de Rais's youth, Ambroise Ledru (1849–1935), president of the Maine Province Historical Society, reproduced several testimonies gathered during a judicial inquiry carried out in Angers in 1461–1462 at the request of René de Rais, Gilles's younger brother. This document includes statements from two Champtocé residents: a helmsman named Jean Rousseau and a sergeant named Michel Guiot. The first witness claims to have attended Gilles de Rais's baptism some 52 years earlier (around 1409 or 1410), in the parish church of Saint-Père de Champtocé, while the second affirms that Gilles was born "55 years ago or thereabouts,” around 1406 or 1407. According to the same angevin survey, the marriage of Guy de Laval and Marie de Craon was celebrated by Jean du Bellay, abbot of Saint-Florent de Saumur; however, the latter did not become abbot of the said place until 1405. Archivist René Blanchard emphasized that the legal instruments dated February 5 and 17, 1404 "constantly speak of marriage to the future and leave no doubt on this point"; consequently, "Gilles was born at the earliest at the end of 1404." Assuming that Gilles de Rais could not have begun his military career too young before "soon reaching the highest ranks,” Blanchard adds that "it does not seem possible to put Gilles’s birth much further back than a year after his parents' union." Blanchard also judges 1407 to be too late, giving no credence to Michel Guiot's testimony on the grounds that the sergeant erroneously dates Jean de Craon's death. Archivist-paleographer Matei Cazacu builds on Blanchard's remarks, but also points out that Jean de Craon and Guy de Laval had to submit the deed of their agreement to the Parlement of Paris prior to the marriage. The homologation took place on May 2, 1404; this procedure delayed Guy de Laval and Marie de Craon's nuptials by as much, thus postponing the birth of their first child "to 1405 at the earliest". Besides, Cazacu suggests that Gilles de Rais's birth or baptism date could possibly coincide with Saint Giles' feast day on September 1st, hence his first name. Afterwards, medievalists Jacques Chiffoleau and Olivier Bouzy refer to 1405 as the year of birth Also following Cazacu, while stressing that Gilles de Rais's date of birth is "doubtful”, medievalist Claude Gauvard puts it "probably on September 1, 1405".) Furthermore, an archival document indicates Gilles's age ("14 to 15 years old") in February 1422. (Note: Medievalist Marcelle-Renée Reynaud mentions an archival document stating that Gilles de Rais was 14 to 15 years old in February 1422. This information was given in the course of a transfer duty seigniorial tax concerning the castellany of Ambrières, one of Gilles de Rais's properties in Maine, of which he ceded, as vassal, two-thirds of the revenues to his suzerain Yolande of Aragon.)

Gilles's younger brother René was probably born around 1414. Gilles and René's mother Marie de Craon died at an unknown date, while her husband Guy de Rais died after, (Note: Member of learned societies of Touraine, Charles Mourain de Sourdeval asserts that Guy de Rais died before his wife Marie de Craon, the latter subsequently marrying Charles d'Estouville, seigneur de Villebon. Abbé Eugène Bossard endorses this assertion. However, archivist-paleographer Arthur Bertrand de Broussillon points out that this is a homonym error: Charles d'Estouville did indeed marry a Marie de Craon, but she did not belong to the younger branch of La Suze. In fact, Gilles de Rais's mother predeceased her husband, as Guy de Rais's will and testament attests. In this document, dated 28 or 29 October 1415, Guy declares that he wishes to be buried at Notre-Dame de Buzay "near the tomb of my dearest wife Marie de Craon" ("juxta sepulturam dicte carissime deffuncte uxoris mee Marie de Credonio"). Matei Cazacu suggests that Marie de Craon died "probably while giving birth to her second child, René, in January 1414". The exact date of her death remains unknown.) at the end of October 1415 in Machecoul, "suffering from a serious bodily infirmity" according to the terms of his will and testament.

The cause of Guy de Rais's death remains unknown, although several authors have mistakenly repeated a fictional account, first depicted in a French novel published in 1928, in which he is disembowelled by a wild boar during a hunting accident. Malaria or wounds sustained at the Battle of Agincourt have also been proposed by historians as possible causes of death, but neither is supported by contemporary documentary evidence. (Note: The date of Guy de Rais's will and testament, 28 or 29 October 1415, is given by Matei Cazacu as that of his death. Abbé Arthur Bourdeaut erroneously dates the testament to 28 September 1415, an error repeated by Georges Bataille and then Jacques Heers. In this document, Gilles de Rais's father declares that he is "suffering from a serious bodily infirmity" ("infirmitate gravi detentus corpore"), with no further details. Matei Cazacu cautiously hypothesizes that the cause of death was malaria, a disease rife in the Vendée at the time. The medieval historian Valérie Toureille has suggested that Guy de Rais may have been wounded at the Battle of Agincourt and taken back to Brittany, where he died. However, no contemporary sources support this hypothesis. In a fictional account, journalist and novelist Pierre La Mazière (1879–1947) portrayed Gilles de Rais's father as having been gored by a wild boar during a hunting accident, a spectacular death narrated again in a novel by Marc Dubu and then in an essay by Georges Meunier. From then on, this fictional event was successively taken at face value by various authors.)

The House of Craon suffered heavy losses at the Battle of Agincourt in October 1415. Among those killed were Jean de Craon's only son, Amaury de Briolay, and several other members of the Craon family. Gilles and René consequently became the sole heirs of Jean de Craon, who raised them at the Château de Champtocé after they were orphaned. In doing so, their maternal grandfather disregarded the provisions of the last will and testament of Guy de Rais, which had appointed Jean II Tournemine de la Hunaudaye as the "guardian, tutor, protector, defender and lawful administrator" of the two orphans.

=== Marriage and Issue ===
On 4 January 1417, Jean de Craon betrothed his grandson, Gilles de Rais, to Jeanne Paynel, the wealthy Norman heiress and daughter of Foulques VI Paynel, seigneur de Hambye and Bricquebec. Although the Parlement of Paris forbade the marriage until Jeanne Paynel came of age, it never took place for unknown reasons. Jeanne later became abbess of the Benedictine convent of Lisieux.

Jean de Craon then betrothed Gilles de Rais to a niece of John V, Duke of Brittany: Béatrice of Rohan, daughter of Alain IX of Rohan and Marguerite of Brittany. The contract, dated Vannes 28 November 1418, was not carried out, possibly due to Beatrice's death.

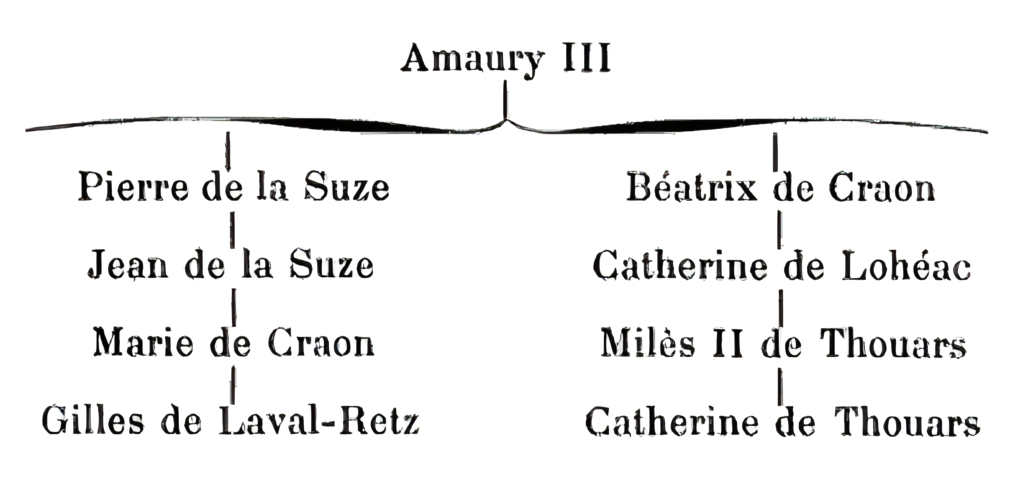
Gilles de Rais and his wife, Catherine de Thouars, were related within the fourth degree of consanguinity. Both were descended from Amaury III de Craon through their maternal and paternal lines

Gilles de Rais eventually became engaged to Catherine de Thouars, the daughter of Miles II de Thouars and Béatrice de Montjean. The match faced several obstacles. Gilles de Rais and Catherine de Thouars were related within the fourth degree of consanguinity under canon law, (Note: The fourth degree of consanguinity in medieval canon law corresponds approximately to eighth cousins in modern genealogical terminology.) requiring an ecclesiastical dispensation. The House of Craon was also involved in disputes with Miles II de Thouars, seigneur de Pouzauges and Tiffauges. Gilles de Rais ignored these obstacles. Before obtaining the required dispensation, he abducted Catherine de Thouars and married her in a chapel outside his parish, without the publication of the banns. The couple signed a marriage contract on 30 November 1420, but the Church annulled the union and declared it incestuous.

After the death of Miles II de Thouars, matrimonial alliances brought the houses of Craon and Thouars closer together, (Note: On 18 June 1421, Jean de Craon, widower of Béatrice de Rochefort, married Anne de Sillé, widow of Jean de Montjean (died April 1418). Anne and Jean de Montjean had two daughters: Jeanne, wife of Jean V de Bueil, and Béatrice, wife of Miles II de Thouars and mother of Catherine de Thouars, Gilles de Rais's wife. This marriage thus made Gilles de Rais's maternal grandfather the husband of his wife's maternal grandmother.) helping to regularize the situation of the couple. On 24 April 1422, the papal legate approached Hardouin de Bueil, bishop of Angers, asking him to pronounce a sentence of separation against Gilles de Rais and Catherine de Thouars, and to impose a penance before absolving them of the crime of incest and allowing them to marry in due form. After conducting an investigation, Hardouin de Bueil celebrated their marriage with great pomp and ceremony on 26 June 1422, at Chalonnes-sur-Loire castle. This union strengthened Gilles de Rais's position in Poitou by "linking him to the house of the Viscounts of Thouars, who dominated the Bas-Poitou region as far as the Atlantic."

Gilles de Rais and Catherine de Thouars's only child, Marie, was born in 1433 or 1434.

=== Family disputes ===
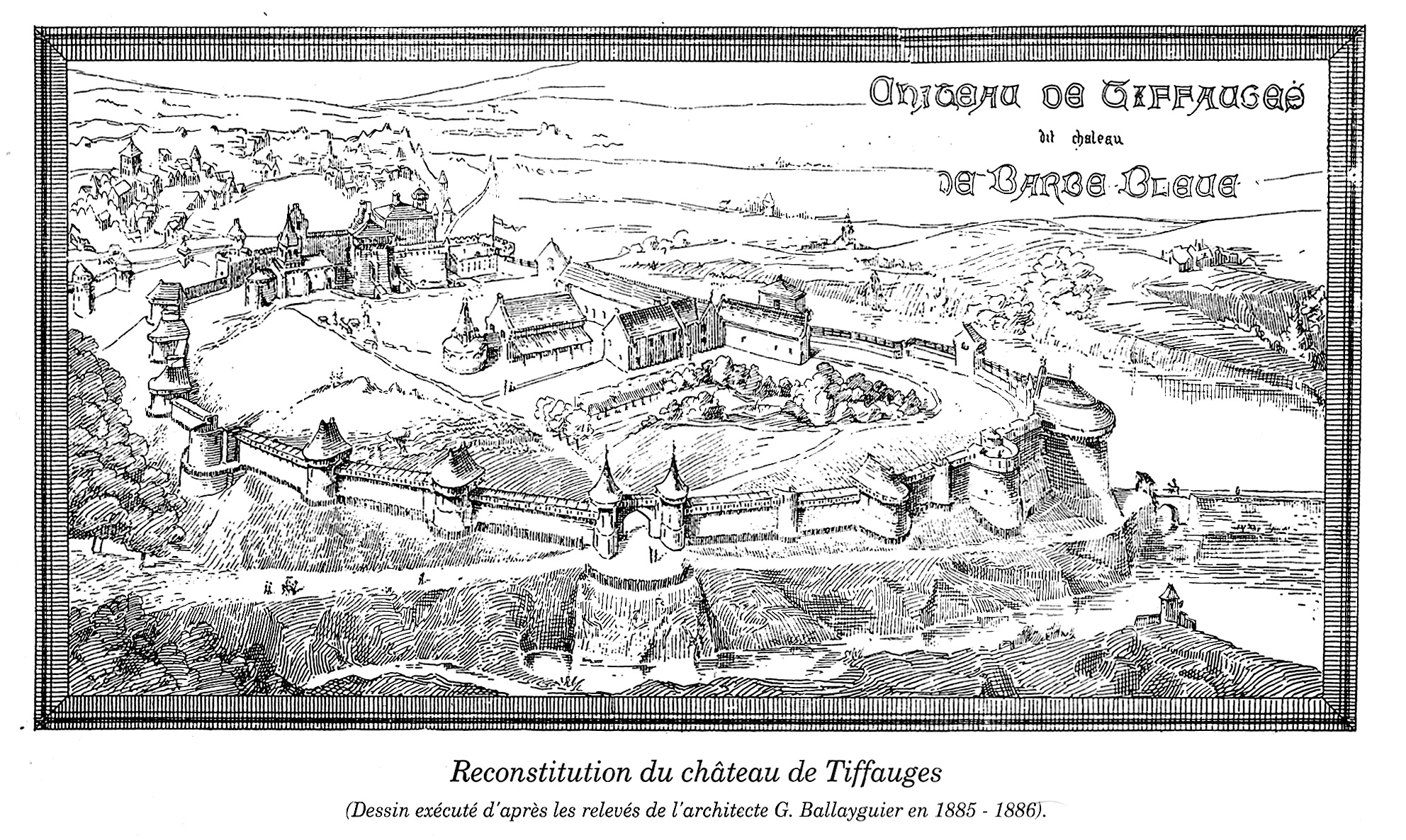
Reconstruction of the Château de Tiffauges and its surrounding walls

The marriage contract allowed Catherine de Thouars's mother, Béatrice de Montjean, to retain several estates, including the castles of Tiffauges and Pouzauges, as her dower. Jean de Craon and Gilles de Rais expected to recover these lands upon Béatrice's death. Béatrice's remarriage to Jacques Meschin de la Roche-Aireault, chamberlain to Charles VII, complicated their claims to her estates. They instructed Jean de la Noë, captain of Tiffauges, to abduct Béatrice. She was imprisoned first at Le Loroux-Bottereau, then at Champtocé, where Jean de Craon and Gilles de Rais threatened to sew her into a sack and throw her into the river unless she renounced her dower rights. Jean de la Noë also captured Jacques Meschin's younger sister.

Jacques Meschin repeatedly brought proceedings before the Parlement of Paris to obtain the release of his wife and sister, but without success. He then sent a bailiff to Champtocé, followed by his brother Gilles Meschin, who led a delegation carrying the summons. Jean de Craon imprisoned all the envoys. At the request of his wife Anne de Sillé, who was also Béatrice's mother, he nevertheless agreed to release Béatrice. The remaining captives were released after the payment of ransoms. Gilles Meschin died a few days later, probably as a result of his imprisonment at Champtocé. Jacques Meschin's younger sister was taken to Brittany and compelled to marry Girard de la Noë, son of the captain of Tiffauges.

Jacques Meschin again appealed to the Parlement of Paris, which resulted in a settlement between the parties. Under the agreement, ratified by the Parlement, Jacques Meschin retained Pouzauges, while Gilles de Rais kept Tiffauges. Jean de Craon and his grandson subsequently took possession of Pouzauges anyway, arguing that Catherine de Thouars, Gilles de Rais's wife, "bears the name [of Pouzauges] in the world". Adam de Cambrai, a councillor of the Parlement of Paris, (Note: The councillors of the Parlement of Paris who remained loyal to Charles VII sat in Poitiers following the Burgundian capture of Paris in 1418. Adam de Cambrai, who had been a councillor at the Parlement of Paris since 1412, was among the founders of the Parlement of Poitiers. A staunch supporter of Charles VII, he became First President of the Parlement of Poitiers in 1435 and, following the French reconquest of Paris, First President of the reunited Parlement of Paris in 1436.) travelled to Pouzauges to oversee the execution of the settlement, but he was attacked and robbed by men acting on behalf of Jean de Craon and Gilles de Rais. The numerous judgments subsequently issued against the two men remained unenforced.

=== Titles, estates and wealth ===
Map of the traditional regions of Brittany. In the south, the Pays de Retz was then bordered by an area of marches

Gilles de Rais was one of the greatest lords in western France, owing to his extensive estates in Brittany, Anjou, Poitou, Maine and Angoumois. His network of family and feudal ties, particularly through the houses of Laval and Craon, extended across much of the Western Marches. Characterized by bocage landscapes and the Marais breton ("Breton Marsh"), these frontier regions were difficult to traverse because of their damp oceanic environment. As a result, the Loire and Sèvre Nantaise valleys became the principal transport routes and were controlled by major fortresses. The strategic location of the barony of Retz enabled its lords to control traffic along the Loire, a major commercial route for Brittany and western France as a whole, asserts historian Brice Rabot.

15th-century borders of Poitou and the Duchy of Brittany

Through his father, Gilles de Rais inherited the barony of Retz, traditionally regarded as one of the six oldest baronies of the Duchy of Brittany, although the claim of its antiquity rests on questionable traditions. Located at the "southernmost point of the Duchy of Brittany", the barony comprised a "vast group of some forty parishes stretching between the Loire and the common borders of Poitou and Brittany". Its principal seat was Machecoul, the "head of the barony", together with the castellanies of Coutumier, Bourgneuf, Prigny and half of the Isle of Bouin. These lands bordered the Bay of Bourgneuf, whose salt marshes probably provided Gilles de Rais with a significant source of income. His estates also included an annuity from the Paimpont forest, and the lordship of La Bénate, which encompassed 26 parishes in the marches (13 in Brittany and 13 in Poitou), among other possessions.

From Jean de Craon, he inherited the prominent Angevin lordships of Champtocé and Ingrandes, which derived substantial income from trade on the Loire, as well as the townhouse known as the "Hôtel de La Suze" in Nantes. His Angevin possessions also included the lordships of Blaison and Chemellier, the barony of Briollay, and the lordships of Fontaine-Milon, Grez and Grattecuisse. His Poitevin possessions included the lordships of Cheneché, La Voûte, Sigon, Cloué, Chabanais and the land of Breuil-Mingot, in addition to the barony of Pouzauges and the lordship of Tiffauges, which he acquired through marriage and coercion. In Maine, his estates comprised the lordships of La Suze, Ambrières and Saint-Aubin-Fosse-Louvain, as well as the land of Précigné. In Angoumois, his possessions included the lordships of Confolens, Loubert and Château Morant.

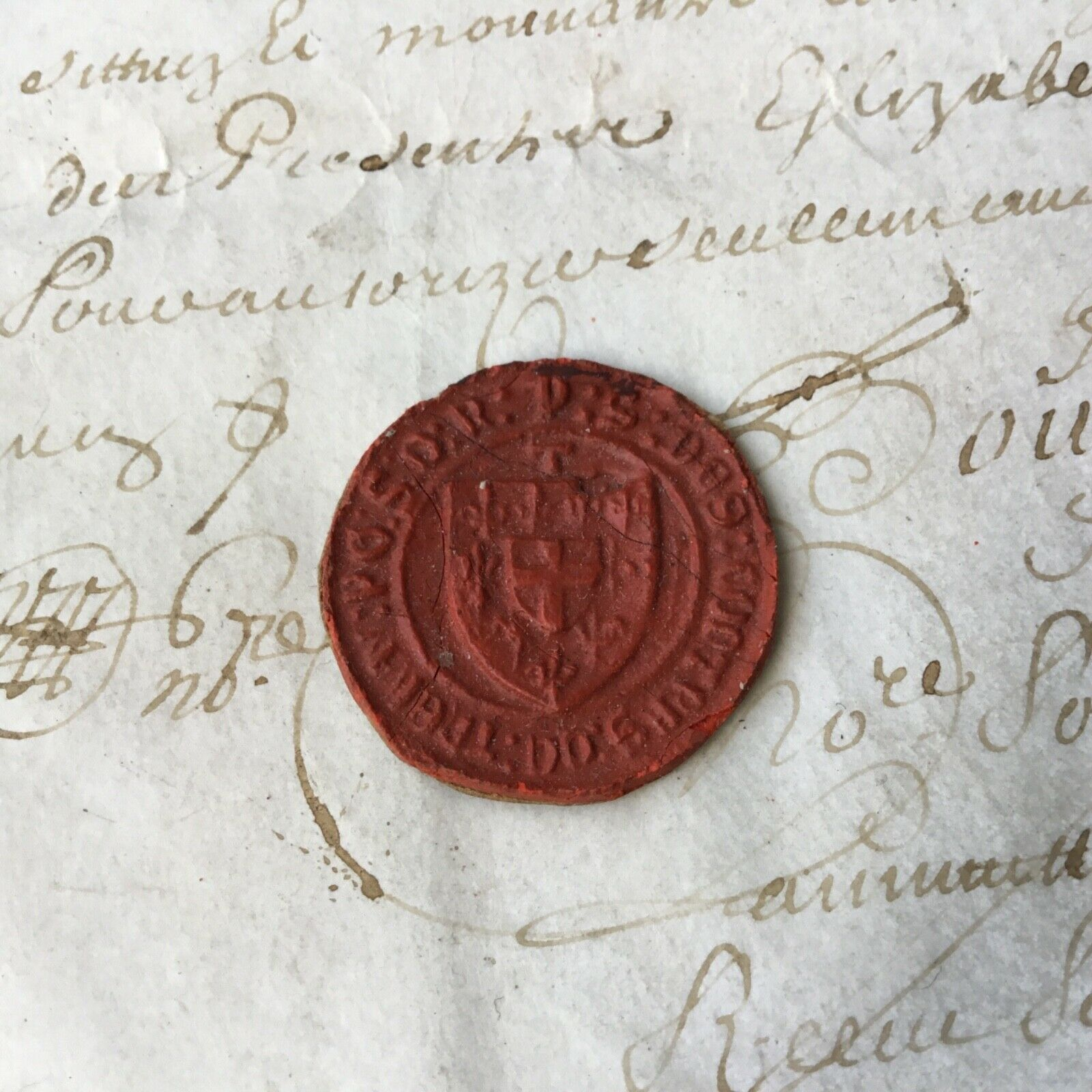
Wax seal reproducing Gilles de Rais's jurisdictional seal relating to contracts for the Tiffauges estate, which he held from his wife Catherine de Thouars

However, this inventory reflects Gilles de Rais's landed wealth at its height, following his marriage to Catherine de Thouars in 1422 and his inheritance from Jean de Craon in 1432. It does not take into account the subsequent alienations through which he gradually diminished his estate, the fact that some lands belonged to his wife, or his assignment of part of his inheritance to his brother René de Rais in 1434.

The income derived from his estates was reduced by a variety of factors, including permanent grants made by earlier Barons of Retz to vassals or ecclesiastical institutions, widows' dower rights, the apparent decline of the Bay of Bourgneuf salt trade, the costs of war, and the geographical dispersal of his possessions. Gilles de Rais's financial difficulties therefore resulted from a combination of these structural constraints and his own mismanagement.

Estimating his wealth remains difficult because the surviving records are fragmentary and imprecise, particularly regarding the revenues generated by his estates. This uncertainty has led to differing interpretations among historians. Jacques Heers argues that Gilles de Rais's wealth and social standing have been overstated, rejecting the description of him as a "great lord" and dismissing claims that he was "one of the richest lords of France" as rhetorical exaggeration. By contrast, Matei Cazacu maintains that he belonged to the highest ranks of the French nobility. Drawing on a memorandum prepared by Gilles de Rais's heirs in 1461–1462, Cazacu estimates his annual income at about 50,000 livres tournois, including roughly 30,000 from his estates (Note: According to the heirs' memorandum, Gilles de Rais's annual revenues amounted to approximately 30,000 livres tournois: 10,000 to 12,000 livres from the estate of Guy de Laval-Rais, 13,000 to 14,000 livres inherited from Jean de Craon, and 6,000 to 7,000 livres from his marriage to Catherine de Thouars. Several years after Gilles de Rais's execution, lawyers representing Francis II, Duke of Brittany, challenged these estimates. Matei Cazacu argues that their position is explained by the duke's obligation to restore Gilles de Rais's estates to his heirs and to compensate them for the revenues he had received from them. He therefore considers the heirs' memorandum probably reliable on this point, as it reflects the recovery of feudal revenues observed since 1420. Philippe Contamine, however, regards the overall figure of 30,000 livres tournois as "doubtless exaggerated".) and nearly 20,000 from his office as Marshal of France. Although well below the revenues of princes such as the dukes of Orleans, Burgundy and Berry, this income placed him among the wealthiest Breton lords of the fifteenth century. Whatever the exact estimate, his resources proved insufficient to sustain his lavish expenditure for more than a few years.

=== Military career ===
==== Uncertain early military career ====
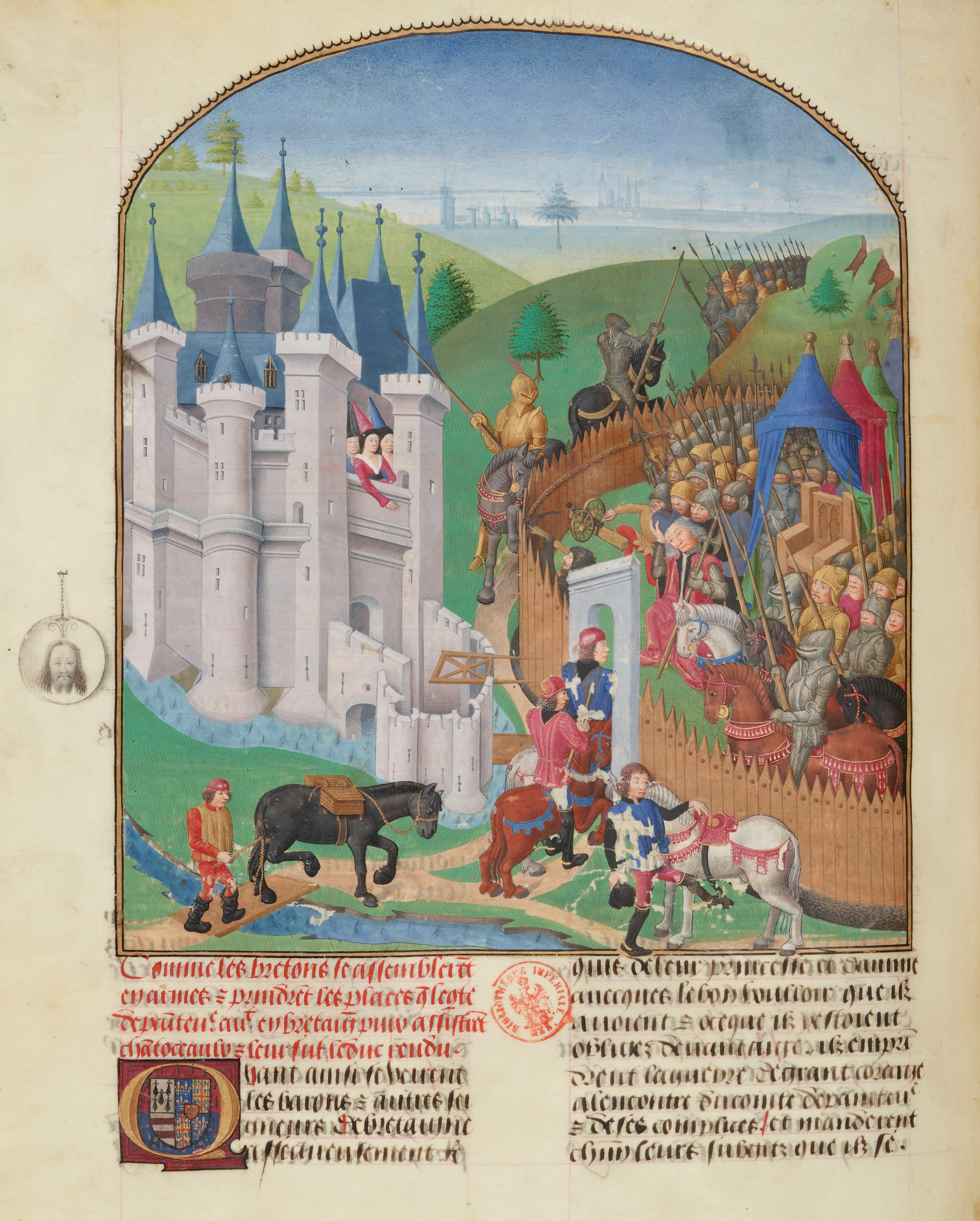
Siege of the Château de Champtoceaux, the final phase of the 1420 Breton civil war (15th-century miniature, BnF)

In the decades following the War of the Breton Succession, the defeated faction continued to challenge the rule of the House of Montfort over the Duchy of Brittany. It maintained its claim to the ducal title and repeatedly conspired against the Montfort dukes. In February 1420, the House of Penthièvre, led by Marguerite de Clisson and her two sons, Olivier and John, seized Duke John V in violation of the Treaty of Guérande and held him captive at the Château de Champtoceaux. The conspiracy received temporary support from Charles, Dauphin of France and the future king.

The capture of John V triggered a new civil war in Brittany. Duchess Joan, the duke's wife, rallied the Breton nobility to the Montfort cause, including former Penthièvre supporters such as Jean de Craon. On 17 February 1420, he joined the other assembled lords in swearing to defend the duchess and secure John V's release. In retaliation, Penthièvre forces attacked his lands and those of his grandson, Gilles de Rais, destroying several strongholds, including the castle of La Mothe-Achard. The Montfort forces gradually gained the advantage and besieged the Château de Champtoceaux in May 1420. During the siege, the Breton lords secured the release of Arthur de Richemont, John V's younger brother, from English captivity to lead their forces. The Penthièvre family eventually released John V and abandoned the castle, leaving behind documents implicating the Dauphin. The fortress was later demolished.

Expansion of the Breton ducal demesne between 1400 and 1428, during the reign of John V

Historian Michael Jones regards the affair as a major turning point in fifteenth-century Breton history. It strengthened the authority of John V and his successors, enabling them to consolidate an increasingly autonomous ducal state. The confiscation of the Penthièvre estates also greatly expanded the ducal demesne and provided the dukes with the means to reward their supporters with the seized lands. Following John V's release, Jean de Craon and Gilles de Rais received substantial grants in recognition of their "good and notable services", although these were ultimately commuted into cash payments. Gilles de Rais may also have taken part in the Breton civil war, possibly his first military experience, although this remains disputed because no documentary evidence confirms his personal participation. (Note: Abbé Eugène Bossard argues that Gilles de Rais fought during the Breton Civil War of 1420. Abbé Arthur Bourdeaut, Émile Gabory and Georges Bataille dispute this view, arguing that no contemporary source attests to his participation.[11] More recently, Matei Cazacu has revived Bossard's interpretation.) Jean de Craon and Gilles de Rais may subsequently have entered the household of Arthur de Richemont, John V's younger brother. (Note: Abbé Arthur Bourdeaut describes Arthur de Richemont as Gilles de Rais's "first protector". Medievalist Jacques Heers similarly refers to him as Gilles's "first master". According to Heers, Jean de Craon and Gilles entered Richemont's service in 1420 after helping thwart the Penthièvre conspiracy and secure the release of John V of Brittany, remaining among his followers thereafter. Medievalist Olivier Bouzy likewise dates Gilles's entry into Richemont's service to the beginning of the 1420s. Matei Cazacu takes a different view. Although he acknowledges that the arrival of Richemont and the Breton nobles at the court of Charles VII gave new impetus to the war, he argues that Gilles de Rais had already begun his military career before Richemont's appointment as Constable of France on 7 March 1425.)

Meanwhile, the Kingdom of France suffered further political and military setbacks amid the Armagnac–Burgundian Civil War and the war against the Lancastrian monarchy. In May 1420, Henry V of England secured recognition as the son-in-law and heir of Charles VI of France through the ratification of the Treaty of Troyes. John V of Brittany continued to alternate between the Armagnac faction and the House of Lancaster in an effort to preserve the independence of Brittany. Despite this policy, he ultimately adhered to the Treaty of Troyes in June 1422.

The Dauphin Charles became King of France in October 1422 and continued the war against the English to recover the French crown lands. Jean de Craon and Gilles de Rais may have taken part in the French victory at La Gravelle on 26 September 1423 and in the Battle of Verneuil on 17 August 1424, although this remains speculative. (Note: Matei Cazacu supports this hypothesis despite the absence of any source attesting to the presence of Jean de Craon and his grandson at the Battle of Verneuil. He advances three arguments: they were leading vassals of Duke Louis III of Anjou, they had an interest in defending their Angevin possessions against the English, and several of their relatives are known to have fought in the battle.) The Franco-Scottish defeat at Verneuil further weakened the political and military position of the Valois cause, compounding the consequences of the French defeat at Agincourt nearly a decade earlier.

==== Franco-Breton alliance through the House of Valois-Anjou ====
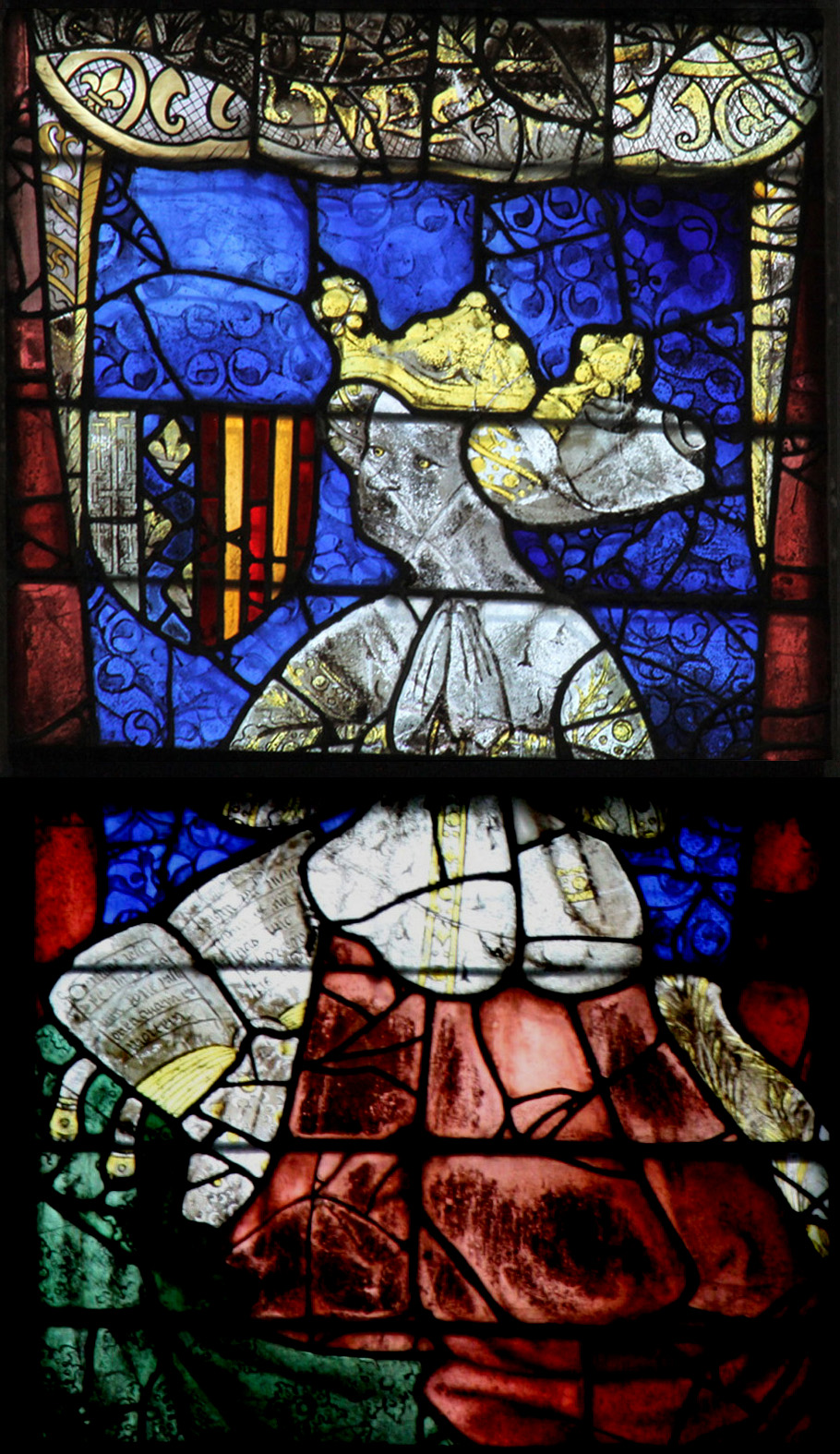
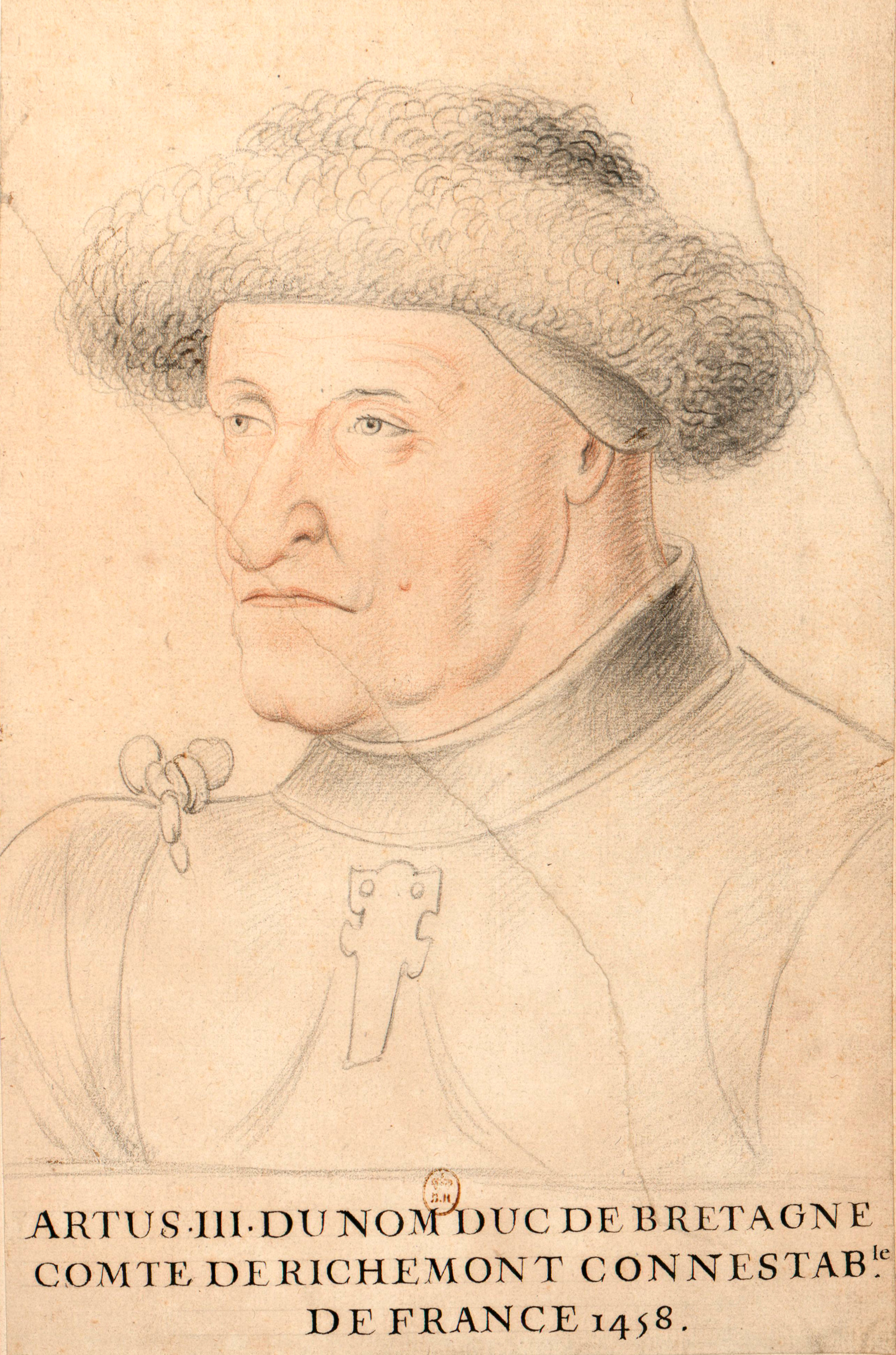
Yolande of Aragon, Duchess of Anjou and head of the House of Valois-Anjou, promoted a Franco-Breton alliance, formalized in 1425 by the appointment of Arthur de Richemont (younger brother of the Duke of Brittany) as Constable of France

King Charles VII of France was forced to seek new allies following the Battle of Verneuil. He turned to his mother-in-law, Yolande of Aragon, head of the House of Valois-Anjou, a cadet branch of the French royal dynasty. Yolande had been working since 1423 to strengthen diplomatic ties between France and Brittany with the help of her vassal Jean de Craon, Gilles de Rais's grandfather. Jean de Craon was a powerful and wealthy Angevin lord who held extensive estates in Maine, Anjou, and Brittany. His influence at the Angevin court, however, appears to have developed only in 1423–1424. Before then, he had spent most of his time in Brittany and had been involved in legal disputes with the Dukes of Anjou over the County of Brienne and the lands of the Counts of Roucy.

Angevin diplomacy ultimately secured the appointment of Arthur de Richemont, the Duke of Brittany's brother, as Constable of France in March 1425. Gilles de Rais appeared in the entourage of King Charles VII during the meetings and festivities held at Saumur in October 1425 to seal the alliance between France and Brittany, although he may have been introduced to the royal court before then. Charles VII defended Gilles de Rais's interests that same month by asking Arthur de Richemont to restore to the young baron several Breton estates, including former possessions of the late Miles de Thouars, the father of Gilles's wife.

The English military campaigns in Maine (1424–1425) enabled the House of Lancaster to pose a significantly greater threat to the borders of the Duchy of Anjou. John of Lancaster, Duke of Bedford and English regent in France, claimed sovereignty over both provinces. The estates of the Houses of Laval and Craon — to which Gilles de Rais was related — lay directly in the path of English raids as early as 1423. La Suze, Jean de Craon's ancestral seat in Maine, was captured by the English in the course of the 1425–1426 campaigns. From late 1425 onward, hostilities erupted between Breton forces and the English garrisons stationed in the Lancastrian-controlled Duchy of Normandy. Operating from their Norman strongholds, the English intensified their incursions along the Breton frontier, placing increasing pressure on the Duchy of Brittany. Arthur de Richemont suffered a crushing defeat at the Battle of Saint-James in 1426, marking another setback for the French war effort. Although some historians have suggested that Gilles de Rais fought in the battle, no contemporary source corroborates his presence there. (Note: Abbé Eugène Bossard asserts that Gilles de Rais "fought for France for the first time" at Saint-James. Noël Valois rejects this claim, arguing that Bossard's "declamations" are unsupported by the available evidence. Abbé Bourdeaut also disputes Bossard's assertion, although he acknowledges that "a Maine contingent fought at St. James." More recently, Matei Cazacu has argued that Gilles de Rais's participation was plausible. He suggests that the chronicles may simply have omitted his name because, unlike at Le Lude, Rainefort and Malicorne, he did not distinguish himself during the battle.) Likewise, there is no evidence that this military defeat gave rise to mutual hostility between Gilles de Rais and his future judge, Jean de Malestroit. (Note: According to Guillaume Gruel, a chronicler in the service of Arthur de Richemont, Jean de Malestroit was arrested after being accused of accepting bribes from the English and delaying the payment of the men-at-arms, thereby contributing to the French defeat at Saint-James. Historian Olivier Bouzy suggests that Gruel may have confused events or repeated a slander spread by Arthur de Richemont to deflect responsibility for his own military failure. In 1905, Salomon Reinach, who argued for Gilles de Rais's innocence, used this anecdote to portray Malestroit in an unfavourable light by emphasizing the accusations of treason and Anglophilia made against the future judge of Gilles de Rais. As cultural adviser Philippe Reliquet notes, Reinach thus fashioned the image of a French war hero who fell victim to a Breton tribunal presided over by a treacherous bishop harbouring "the darkest designs and the longest resentments". Noël Valois dismisses as "pure fantasy" the idea that the battle marked the beginning of a lasting mutual hostility between Malestroit and Gilles de Rais. In support of this view, he points out that Gilles de Rais's presence among Arthur de Richemont's troops at Saint-James remains uncertain and that there is no reason to suppose that Malestroit bore a particular grudge against him rather than against the many other Breton nobles who had served under Richemont's command. Malestroit was a "strong personality" who remained committed to the autonomy and sovereignty of the Duchy of Brittany. As an "instrument of ducal policy", he consulted his lord, John V, Duke of Brittany, in the Gilles de Rais affair as in all other matters.)

Coat of arms of Georges de La Trémoille

In June 1427, Georges de La Trémoille, seigneur de Sully, became Grand Chamberlain of France. He soon emerged as the leading figure in the King's Council, where he became embroiled in a bitter rivalry with Arthur de Richemont. That same month, Yolande of Aragon appointed Jean de Craon, Gilles de Rais's maternal grandfather, lieutenant general in Anjou and Maine, an appointment that closely coincided with La Trémoille's ascent to power. The Grand Chamberlain was a distant cousin of Gilles de Rais through the Craon branch. His family's influence at court appears to have reinforced Gilles de Rais's commitment to the war against the English in the borderlands of Maine, where he was appointed captain of the fortress of Sablé in the Duke of Anjou's service. Jean de Craon placed his grandson under the military tutelage of Guillaume de la Jumellière, seigneur de Martigné-Briant, another of Yolande's advisers at the ducal court of Anjou.

Following Bedford's declaration of war on the Duchy of Brittany on 15 January 1427 and the English siege of Pontorson (February–May 1427), John V, Duke of Brittany, entered into negotiations with the House of Lancaster, leading to an agreement in July 1427. On 8 September 1427, John V renewed his allegiance to the Treaty of Troyes, returned to the Lancastrian alliance, and ordered his vassals to cease fighting the English. Among the Breton lords who disobeyed the Duke’s order and remained loyal to Charles VII were Gilles de Rais, Viscount Alain de Rohan, Bishop Guillaume de Montfort, and several members of the Laval family. Weakened by military failures, the lack of results from the French–Breton alliance, and his brother's defection, Arthur de Richemont fell into disgrace Estranged from Charles VII, he retained the office of Constable, but left the French court and entered into armed conflict with La Trémoille, without allying himself with the English. Gilles de Rais probably left Richemont's service around this time (c. 1427-1428).

==== Raiding operations against English Garrisons along the Maine Frontier ====
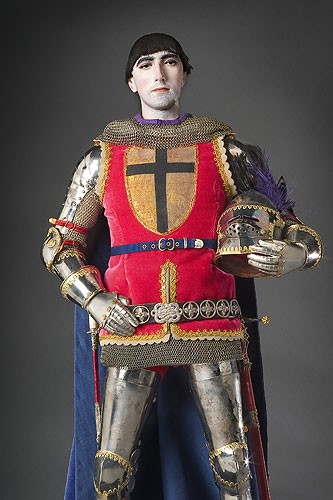
Gilles de Retz by George S. Stuart. This sculpture portrays Gilles de Rais in the attire of a French man-at-arms. He is depicted clean-shaven and wearing the bowl cut hairstyle fashionable among noblemen during the first half of the fifteenth century. Clad in full plate armor and carrying a hounskull bascinet beneath his arm, he wears a tabard bearing the coat of arms of the House of Retz.

Chronicles began mentioning Gilles de Rais alongside other French captains in the second half of 1427. He conducted raiding operations along the borders of Maine with Ambroise de Loré and his kinsman Jacques de Dinan, seigneur de Beaumanoir. Their raids against English forces enabled the French captains to capture the fortress of Ramefort at Gennes. Gilles de Rais and his fellow commanders honoured their pledge to spare the English garrison after taking the stronghold, but they ordered the execution of the French-speaking men found among its defenders. This action may reflect a strong sense of national identity, directed against combatants regarded as "renegade Frenchmen" or "false Frenchmen", supporters of the dual monarchy of England and France.

The lords of Rais, Loré and Beaumanoir subsequently recaptured Malicorne Castle from the English. The captains executed the French-speaking defenders, as they had done at Ramefort. Medieval chronicles provide an uncertain chronology for these operations, making precise dating impossible. In a separate engagement, Gilles de Rais either killed or captured the English captain Blackburn during the fighting at the Château du Lude, according to conflicting accounts. Medievalist Boris Bove notes that fortresses frequently changed hands because of weak garrisons and "the endless reversals of local lords, who often belonged to competing networks".

Gilles de Rais also assisted his relatives in the financial consequences of the war. He contributed 1,000 gold écus towards the ransom of his cousin André de Lohéac in the spring of 1428. English forces had captured the young nobleman during the siege of Laval on 16 March 1428. The House of Laval (namely Guy XIV, Anne and Jeanne de Laval-Tinténiac, respectively his brother, mother and grandmother) undertook to reimburse the "very dear and beloved cousins and great friends" who had helped secure his release.

==== Comrade-in-arms of Joan of Arc ====
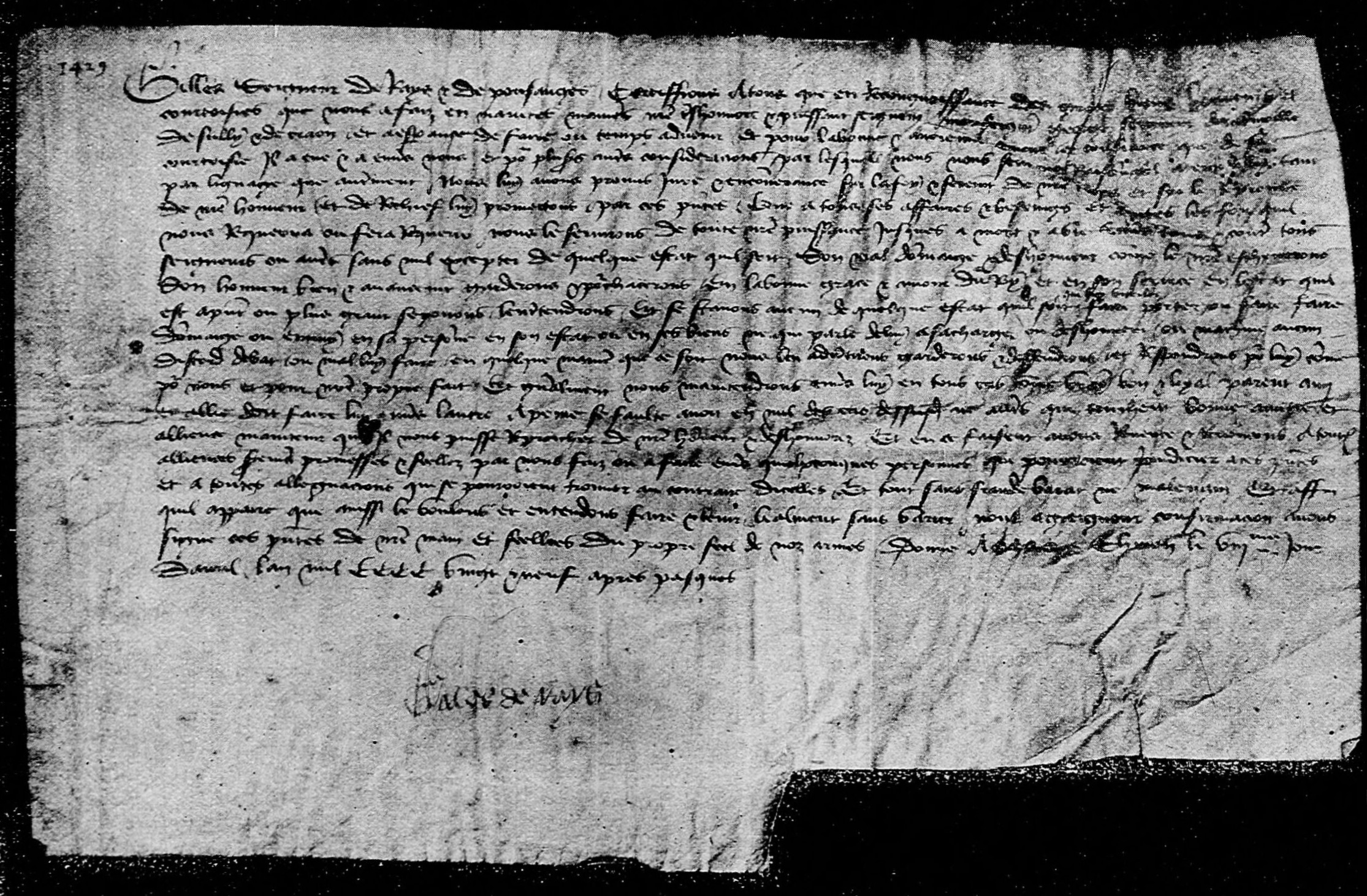
Treaty of alliance between Grand Chamberlain Georges de La Trémoille and Gilles de Rais, 8 April 1429

Additional English forces arrived in France in June 1428. These reinforcements laid siege to Orléans in October. In February 1429, Joan of Arc arrived in Chinon from Vaucouleurs to speak with the King. Gilles de Rais was then present at the Château de Chinon, as were the other captains in Charles VII's entourage during the war. A month later, in a letter dated 8 April 1429, signed by himself and sealed with his seal, Gilles de Rais formed an alliance with his cousin, Grand Chamberlain Georges de La Trémoille. The latter thus pursued his strategy of bilateral alliances with members of the French nobility to consolidate his position with the King and to protect himself against the plots fomented by Constable Arthur de Richemont and his allies.

Gilles de Rais sat on the Royal Council from 1429 to 1434, but only occasionally, held back by his military obligations or for other reasons. His title of King's Counselor may be purely honorary. He's also referred to as Charles VII's chamberlain. As part of a Franco-Breton diplomatic rapprochement, probably supported by La Trémoille, Gilles de Rais wrote to John V, Duke of Brittany in April 1429, urging him to reinforce the army being assembled in Blois to help the city of Orléans besieged by the English.

At the same time, after being interrogated by French doctors of theology in Chinon and Poitiers, Joan of Arc received authorization to accompany the relief army to Orléans. On 25 April 1429, the Maid arrived in Blois to find a convoy of food, arms and ammunition ready, as well as an escort of several dozen men-at-arms and archers, commanded by Gilles de Rais and Jean de Brosse, marshal of Boussac. The escort included a company of Angevins and Manceaux soldiers paid by Gilles de Rais, who "appears to be at the heart of this otherwise ... modest operation", affirms medievalist Philippe Contamine.

Gilles de Rais contributed to the lifting of the siege of Orléans, notably by taking part in the storming of the Saint-Loup bastille on 6 May. He then took part with Joan of Arc in the Loire Campaign (1429), aimed at recapturing the towns occupied by English garrisons in the region. Gilles de Rais participated in the Battle of Jargeau on 12 June 1429, and the Battle of Patay on 18 June 1429. On the way to Reims, Gilles de Rais and Jean de Brosse, marshal of Boussac, both commanded the vanguard of the French army.

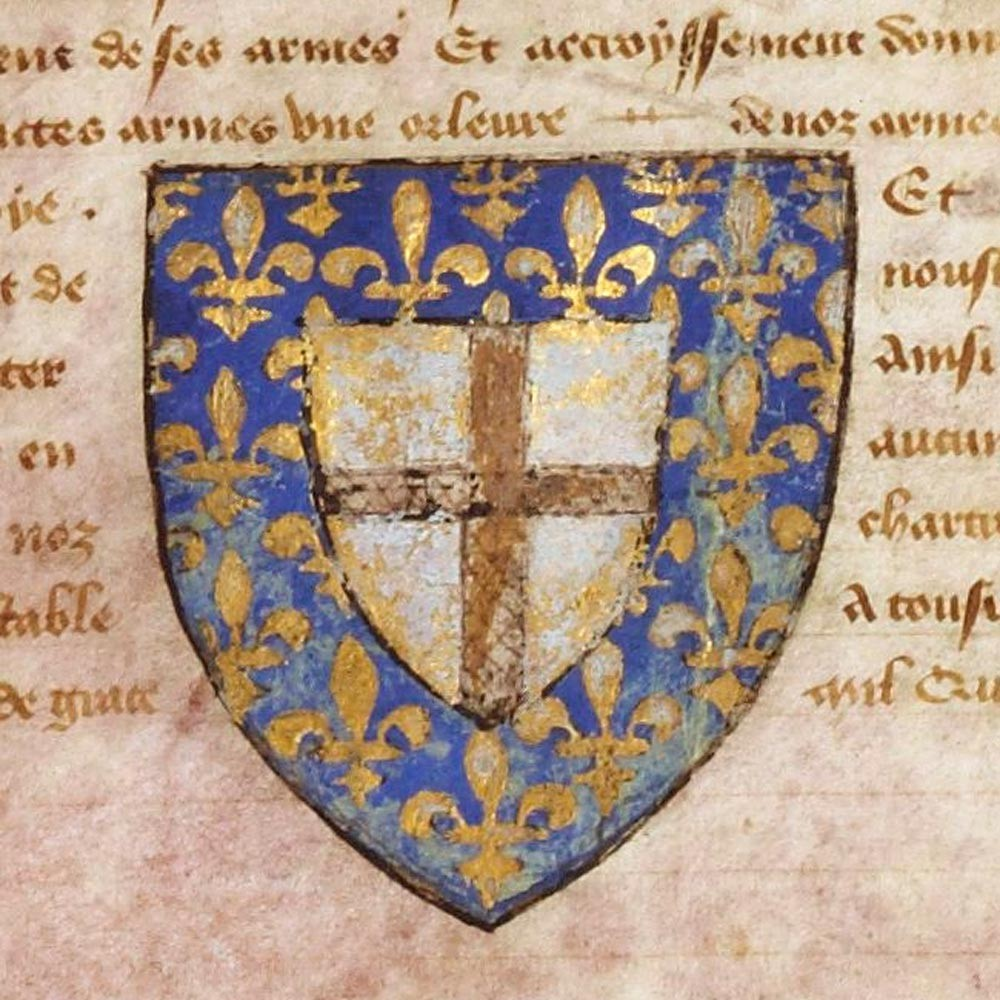
Gilles de Rais's coat of arms from September 1429 onwards. Letters patent from Charles VII granting to him a bordure of the royal arms of France

On 17 July 1429, during the coronation of the French monarch, Gilles de Rais and three other lords were charged with carrying the Holy Ampulla from the Basilica of Saint-Remi in Reims to the Metropolitan Church. On the same day, Gilles de Rais was elevated to the dignity of Marshal of France, an honour that was granted either in recognition of his military achievements or owing to the political support of the Grand Chamberlain, the two interpretations not being mutually exclusive.

On Monday 15 August 1429, Charles VII entrusted the wings of his army to his two marshals, Jean de Boussac and Gilles de Rais, when royal and Anglo-Burgundian troops faced each other at Montépilloy. On 8 September 1429, during the siege of Paris, Joan of Arc wanted Gilles de Rais and Raoul de Gaucourt by her side during the assault on the Porte Saint-Honoré. Gilles de Rais stood by Joan's side all day, among numerous men-at-arms, trying in vain to reach and cross the Parisian wall from a rear ditch. At nightfall, Joan was wounded in the leg by a crossbow bolt. The siege of Paris was quickly lifted, and the "coronation army" withdrew to the Loire before being dismissed at Gien on 21 September 1429. That same month, Charles VII again honoured Gilles de Rais for his "commendable services" by confirming his title of Marshal and granting him the privilege of adding to his coat of arms a bordure bearing the fleur-de-lis, a royal favour shared only with the Maid.

On an unspecified date, a French military expedition led by Xaintrailles and La Hire left Beauvais and settled in Louviers, a town seven leagues (around 28 kilometres) from Rouen, where Joan of Arc was being held prisoner since 23 December 1430, after her capture at the siege of Compiegne. Medievalist Olivier Bouzy states that "important figures took part in the Louviers expedition or made an appearance in the town", like the "Bastard of Orléans" and Gilles de Rais, whose presence is attested on 26 December 1430. These troop movements were interpreted by some historians as an attempt to free Joan of Arc but this hypothesis is not proven. Besides, no such delivery attempt appears to have actually taken place.

==== Civil wars between La Trémoille and Richemont's allies ====
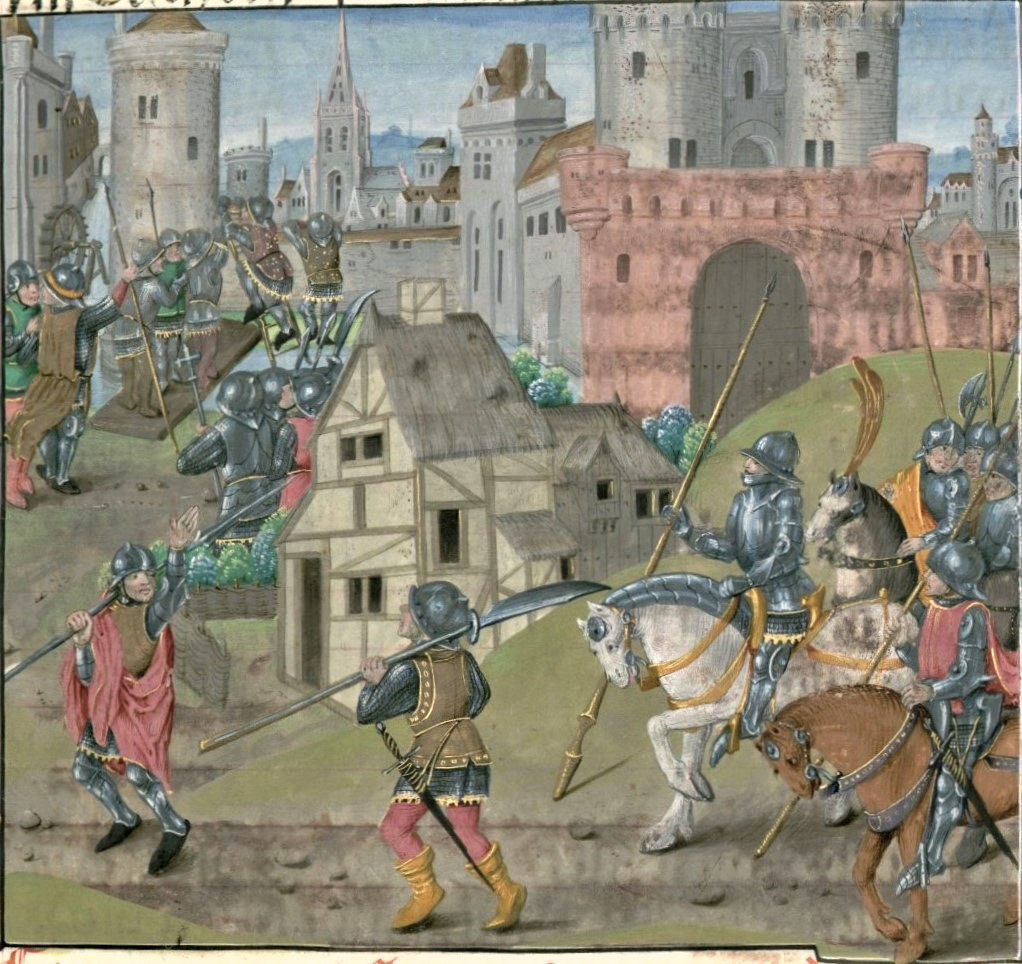
Men-at-arms in front of the fictitious town of Crathor. Illuminated manuscript of Jean de Bueil's Le Jouvencel, BnF, 4th quarter of the 15th century.

In parallel with his fight against the Anglo-Burgundians, Grand Chamberlain Georges de La Trémoille continued his "private war" against Constable Arthur de Richemont, himself supported by the House of Valois-Anjou. In this conflict, Gilles de Rais supported La Trémoille, his cousin and ally.

Despite the similar policies pursued towards the Duchy of Brittany and the Burgundian State by the House of Valois-Anjou on the one hand and La Trémoille on the other, the latter ended up serving gradually as a "repellent" by "federating against him the various components" of Charles VII's court, "paradoxically facilitating (...) the strengthening of the Angevins at the French court", says medievalist Laurent Vissière. The young Charles of Anjou, the future strongman of the Royal Council, had been a member of this governing body since 30 March 1430, thanks to his mother Yolande of Aragon. On 26 October 1430, as the king's lieutenant general in Anjou and Maine, Charles of Anjou appointed Jean de Bueil captain of the men-at-arms and archers garrisoning the castle and town of Sablé, a place previously commanded by captain Gilles de Rais and royal governor Jacques de Dinan, seigneur de Beaumanoir.

Civil war broke out again in September 1431 when La Trémoille launched Captain Rodrigo de Villandrando into the duchy of Anjou. In 1432, Jean de Bueil succeeded in defeating the Spanish mercenary; in return, the latter ravaged Bueil's Touraine lands. Eager to seize Château-l'Hermitage, Gilles de Rais imprisoned Bueil in Sablé, according to Le Jouvencel's romanticized account (which mentions Sablé under the fictitious name of "Crathor"). Still in accordance with this semi-autobiographical story, Bueil succeeded in freeing himself and taking Sablé, but Gilles de Rais recaptured the town in a night attack. In addition, on an unknown date, the garrison of Champtocé castle attacked Yolande of Aragon on her way to Brittany. Gilles de Rais and Jean de Craon's men-at-arms stripped her convoy of numerous horses and baggage.

==== Lifting of the siege of Lagny ====
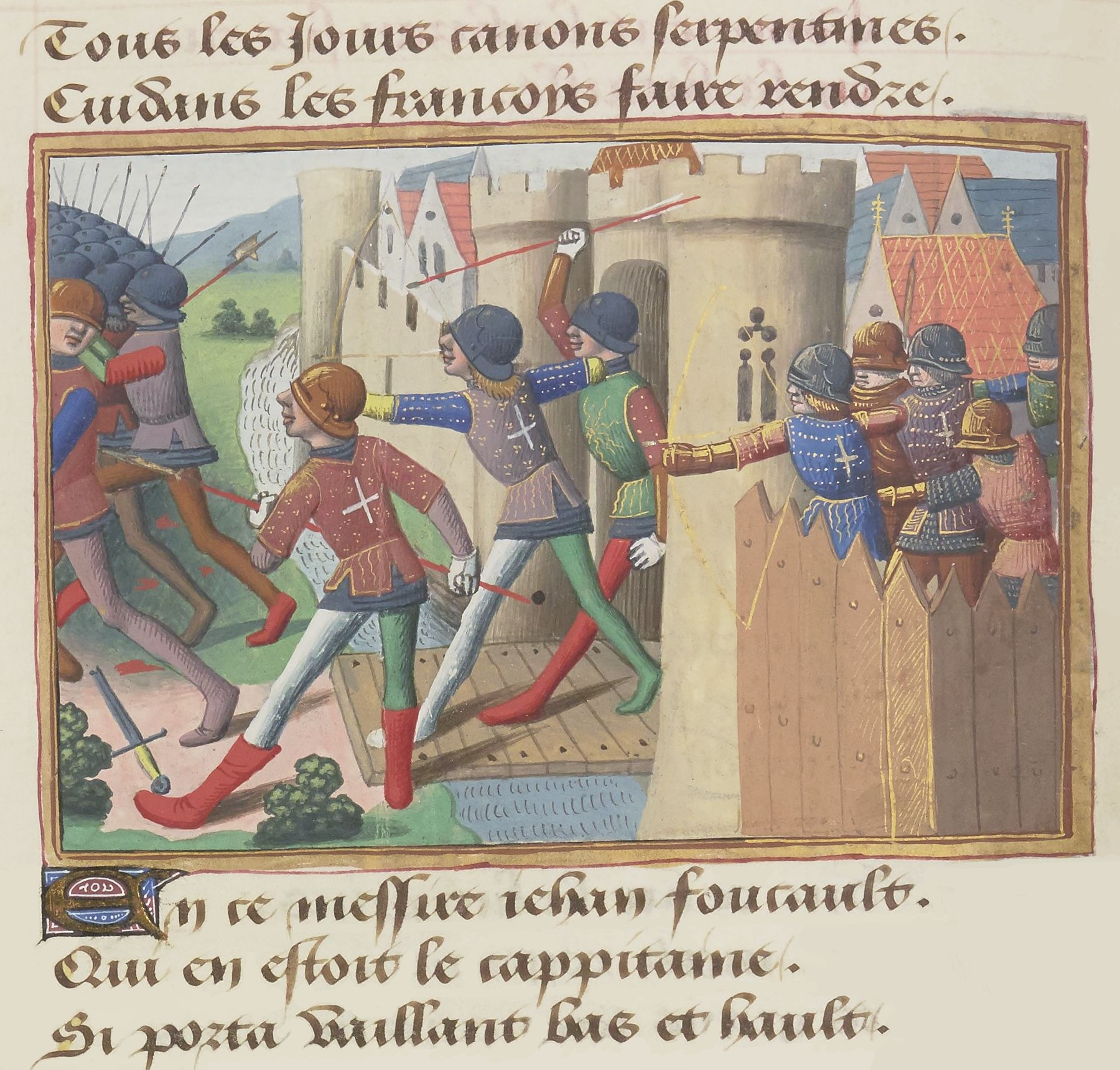
Lifting of the siege of Lagny. Miniature from Les Vigiles de la mort de Charles VII, BnF, late 15th century.

The war against English forces continued around Paris. In August 1432, Gilles de Rais helped lift the siege of Lagny, undoubtedly one of his most famous feats of arms along with the lifting of the siege of Orléans. Assisted by the mercenary captain Rodrigo de Villandrando, he crossed the Marne "upstream, before La Ferté-sous-Jouarre", while other French troops led by Raoul de Gaucourt and the "Bastard of Orléans" managed to enter Lagny through a poorly-guarded point. Medievalist Françoise Michaud-Fréjaville notes that, thanks to this "double movement of troops", the town "was delivered practically without a battle. (...) Faced with the threat, the English abandoned the bastilles and bridge they held downstream from Lagny, leaving much of their equipment behind." On this military episode, Michaud-Fréjaville refers to the "not always very reliable account" of the chronicler Jean Chartier.

Jean Chartier's chronicle also mentions the presence of Gilles de Sillé, cousin of Gilles de Rais, among the French troops engaged in skirmishes the day after the siege of Lagny was lifted. According to Chartier, Gilles de Sillé was taken prisoner on this occasion, unless the chronicler is confusing him with Michel de Sillé, another member of this old house related to Gilles de Rais. (Note: Historian Noël Valois hypothesizes that Michel de Sillé fell into English hands during fighting around the Sillé castle circa 1432–1433. Historian Michel Termeau places the capture of Michel de Sillé during the siege of Lagny in 1432. Termeau also suggests that the chronicler Jean Chartier may have confused the brothers Gilles de Sillé and Michel de Sillé.) Eight years later, during the latter's trial, the testimony of the families of the missing children, as well as the confessions of the accused, cast a shadow over Gilles de Sillé, who was on the run at the time. What's more, according to certain witnesses at the trial, a rumour was spread by Michel de Sillé's servants in an attempt to explain the children's disappearances: the English had supposedly demanded twenty-four young hostages as part of the ransom "of the said sire Michel", a pretext deemed "absurd" and "implausible" by medievalists Noël Valois and Olivier Bouzy, in accordance with the customs governing prisoners of war at the time.

==== Reduction of military commitments ====
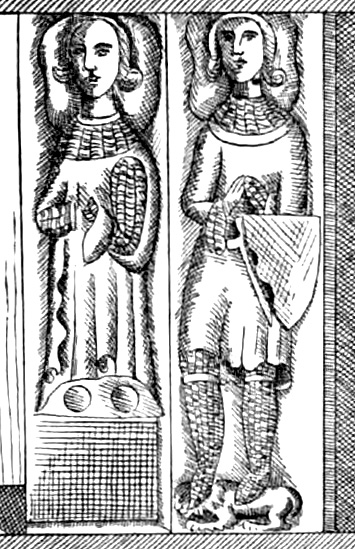
Tomb effigies of Jean de Craon (right) and his wife Béatrice de Rochefort

Jean de Craon, seigneur de La Suze and Champtocé, Gilles's grandfather, died in November 1432. Gilles de Rais inherited the numerous estates and castles of his grandfather, to which were added the Hôtel de La Suze in Nantes and Belle-Poigne in Angers. He likely devoted the year 1433 to organizing this vast patrimony and fully assuming his role as the new head of the House of Rais. During this time spent on his lands, alongside his wife Catherine de Thouars, their daughter was born, named Marie after the child's paternal grandmother.

Gilles's younger brother René obtained the seigneury of La Suze when his elder brother assigned him his share of the inheritance on 25 January 1434, before the ducal court in Nantes. From then on, René was known as René de La Suze, thus raising the name borne by the youngest branch of the Craon family.

At the end of June 1433, in Chinon, an umpteenth plot was hatched against Georges de la Trémoille, who was eventually removed from power. At the Estates General held in Tours in September 1433, Charles VII ratified the fall of his former Grand Chamberlain. The House of Valois-Anjou regained all its influence at court, the young Charles of Anjou became the key man in the Royal Council, and the accomplices in La Trémoille's kidnapping (including Jean de Bueil, Gilles de Rais's enemy) acquired "great government and authority" with the sovereign. Gilbert Motier de La Fayette regained his title of Marshal after losing it to Gilles de Rais in 1429, a dismissal probably intended by La Trémoille at the time.

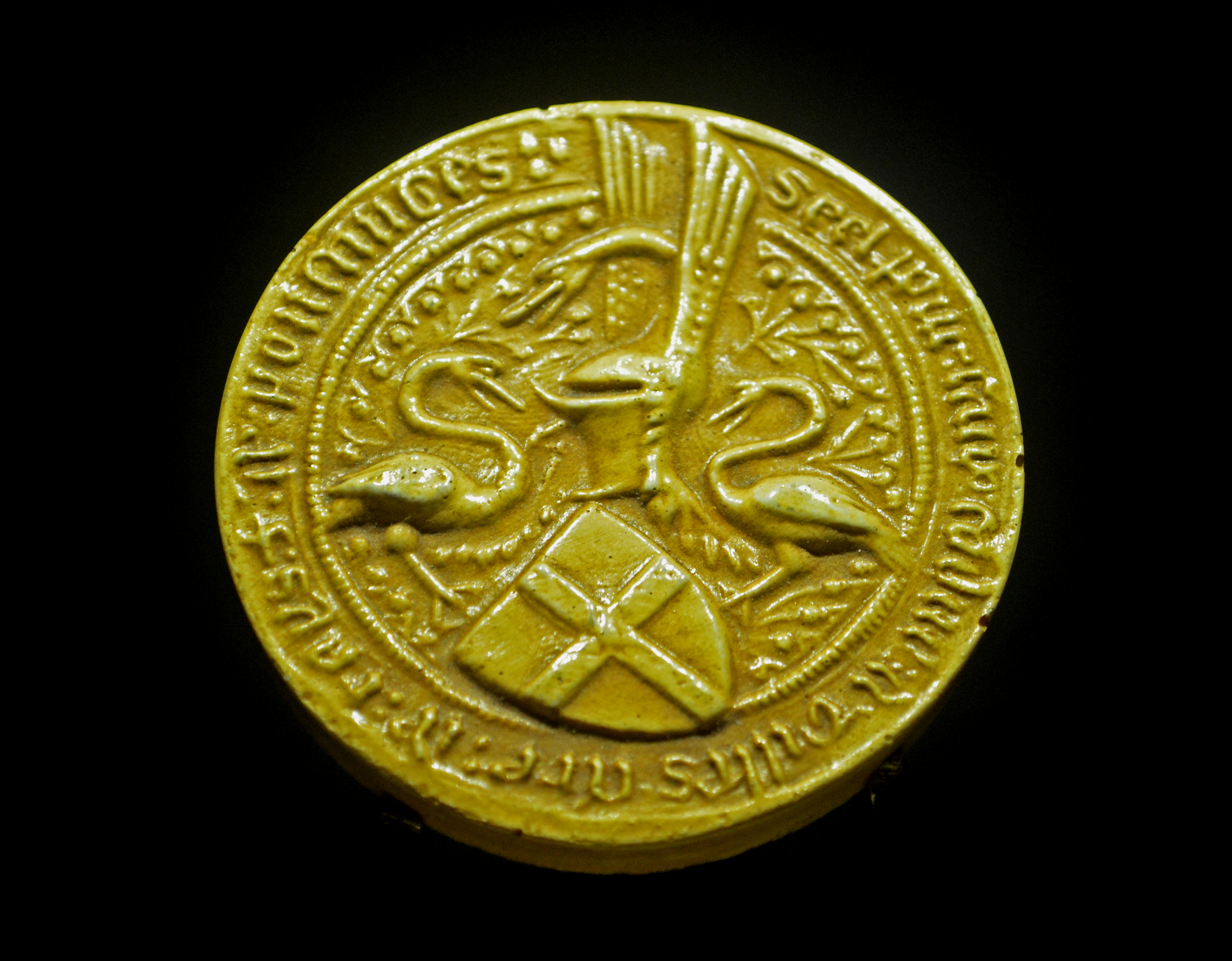
Gilles de Rais's safe-conduct seal (Note: This seal may be a 19th-century forgery, as a hypothetical reconstruction based on certain authentic elements such as the diameter and the presence of a swan. However, its authenticity is otherwise defended.)

In February 1434, the English threatened the Maine town of Sillé, which was the fiefdom of Anne de Sillé, widow of Jean de Craon. In response, the heads of the House of Laval (brothers Guy XIV de Laval and André de Lohéac) along with their cousin Gilles de Rais took part in a military expedition commanded by Constable Arthur de Richemont. The vanguard of the army was under the command of Marshals Pierre de Rieux and Gilles de Rais. The latter, despite his lavish troop contingent, appeared isolated among the lords present (the Constable first and foremost, along with Prigent VII de Coëtivy, Jean de Bueil, Charles of Anjou and John II, Duke of Alençon), most of whom belonged to the coalition of La Trémoille's enemies. The company arrived in front of Sillé, and faced the English, but the two armies separated without fighting.

By mid-1434, despite his forced absence from the court, La Trémoille was still urging Gilles de Rais to continue the war against Burgundians. But, probably already ruined by his expenses, Gilles de Rais made little attempt to prevent Philip the Good's troops from seizing Grancey. After the fall of this city in August 1434, King Charles VII summoned Gilles de Rais and threatened to strip him of his office of marshal. Gilles de Rais "was probably replaced by André de Laval-Lohéac", assumes Philippe Contamine.

On 2 July 1435, Charles VII proclaimed Gilles de Rais to be under interdict, following complaints from his family, namely his brother René de La Suze and the House of Laval.

=== Squandering of heritage ===
Most of the information relating to the squandering of Gilles de Rais's assets comes from a 70-folio memorandum, written around 1461–1462 by his heirs. This document is an expanded version of an earlier memorandum that led to Gilles de Rais being placed under interdict in 1435. Not all medievalists agree on the reliability of this source. Jacques Heers downplays its significance, deeming the document too incriminating, since its purpose is to annul past sales of Gilles de Rais's landed property on the grounds of the latter's insane prodigality. Both "tendentious and instructive" according to Philippe Contamine, the memorandum has nonetheless been critically exploited by historians. In addition to the trial proceedings, Matei Cazacu considers this text to be "the most important document known to date on Gilles de Rais ... a formidable effort to reconstitute the discrepancies of a life and a personality".

The accounting documents relating to Gilles de Rais's expenses and estate management are very incomplete. These gaps in the documentation complicate any comparative study that would enable us to accurately verify the accusations of prodigality made by the heirs. For instance, a precise analysis of Gilles de Rais's expenditures during his stay in Orléans from September 1434 to August 1435 should be based on the 1430s-minute register of notary Jean de Recouin, an Orléanais cleric, but the state of preservation of the first and last pages makes it impossible to read the corresponding deeds. Some pages (almost all relating to Gilles de Rais) have been cut out or have been missing since the 19th century.

In their memorandum, the heirs incriminated Gilles de Rais for the "insane expenses" he incurred as soon as he reached the age of 20, even before the death of his grandfather Jean de Craon. The memorandum also mentioned the upkeep of a troop of two hundred mounted men as one of the late marshal's profligacies, but did not insist on this point. This terseness could be explained by the prudence of the heirs, anxious not to offend Charles VII by voicing too much criticism of Gilles de Rais's military spending, a token of his participation in the war waged against the Anglo-Burgundians. Given that the royal treasury was low on funds at the time, the King of France was all the more inclined then to accept the commitment of Gilles de Rais, a lord capable of bearing the costs of maintaining his own troops, notably in April 1429 when he formed the escort for the convoy of arms and supplies destined for besieged Orléans.

The first sales of Gilles de Rais's estates coincided with his first military campaigns. After a few negligible sales, the baron sold Blaison for 5,000 écus to his martial advisor Guillaume de la Jumellière, seigneur de Martigné-Briant. The transaction was concluded in 1429, a year of heavy expenditure caused by war expeditions following the lifting of the siege of Orléans. The loss of Blaison, Gilles's father's patrimonial land, aroused the anger of Jean de Craon.

=== Criminal life ===
During the years 1434–1435, disgraced by King Charles VII, Gilles de Rais gradually withdrew from military and public life to pursue his own interests.

==== Occult involvement ====
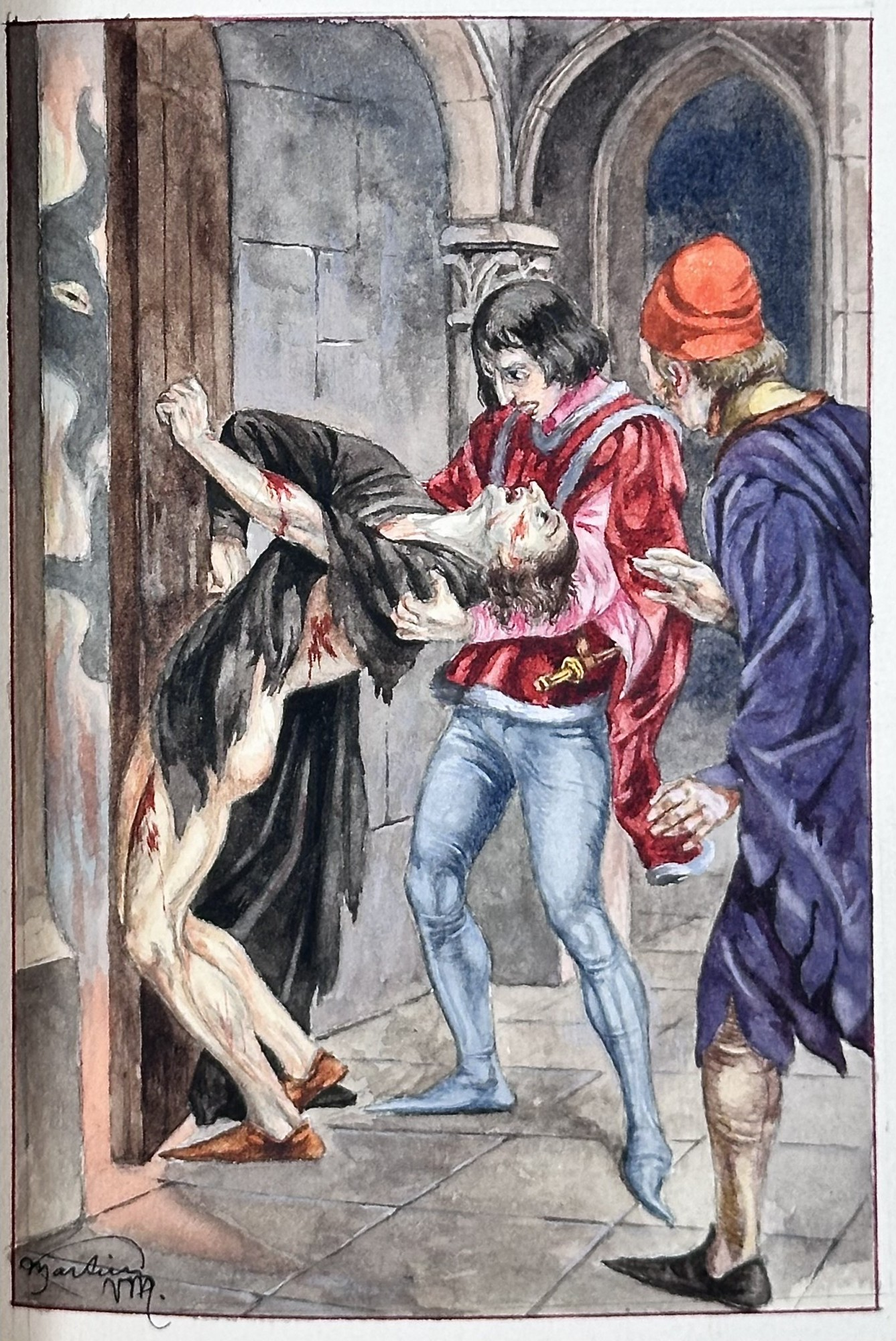
Allegedly beaten by the devil, François Prelati collapses, covered in blood, into the arms of Gilles de Rais, under the gaze of the priest Eustache Blanchet. Watercolor by Martin van Maële for the novel Là-bas by Joris-Karl Huysmans, 1891

According to testimony at his trial by the priest Eustache Blanchet and the Tuscan cleric François Prelati, Gilles de Rais sent out Blanchet to seek individuals who knew alchemy. Blanchet is said to have recruited Prelati in 1438, during a trip to Florence.

In addition to this search for the philosopher's stone, Prelati claimed to have attempted to summon a demon named "Barron" at the castle at Tiffauges, in the presence of Gilles de Rais. The cleric also claimed to have interrogated Barron in a meadow near Josselin, not far from the castle where Duke John V of Brittany met Gilles de Rais on July 1440.

Gilles de Rais provided a contract with the demon for riches that Prelati was to give to the demon later. As no demon manifested after three tries, Gilles de Rais grew frustrated with the lack of results. Prelati said Barron was angry and required the offering of parts of a child. Gilles de Rais provided these remnants in a glass vessel at a later evocation, but to no avail, and the occult experiments left him bitter and his wealth severely depleted.

==== Child murders ====
In his confession, Gilles de Rais said he committed his first assaults on children between spring 1432 and spring 1433.

==== Act of force in Saint-Étienne-de-Mer-Morte ====
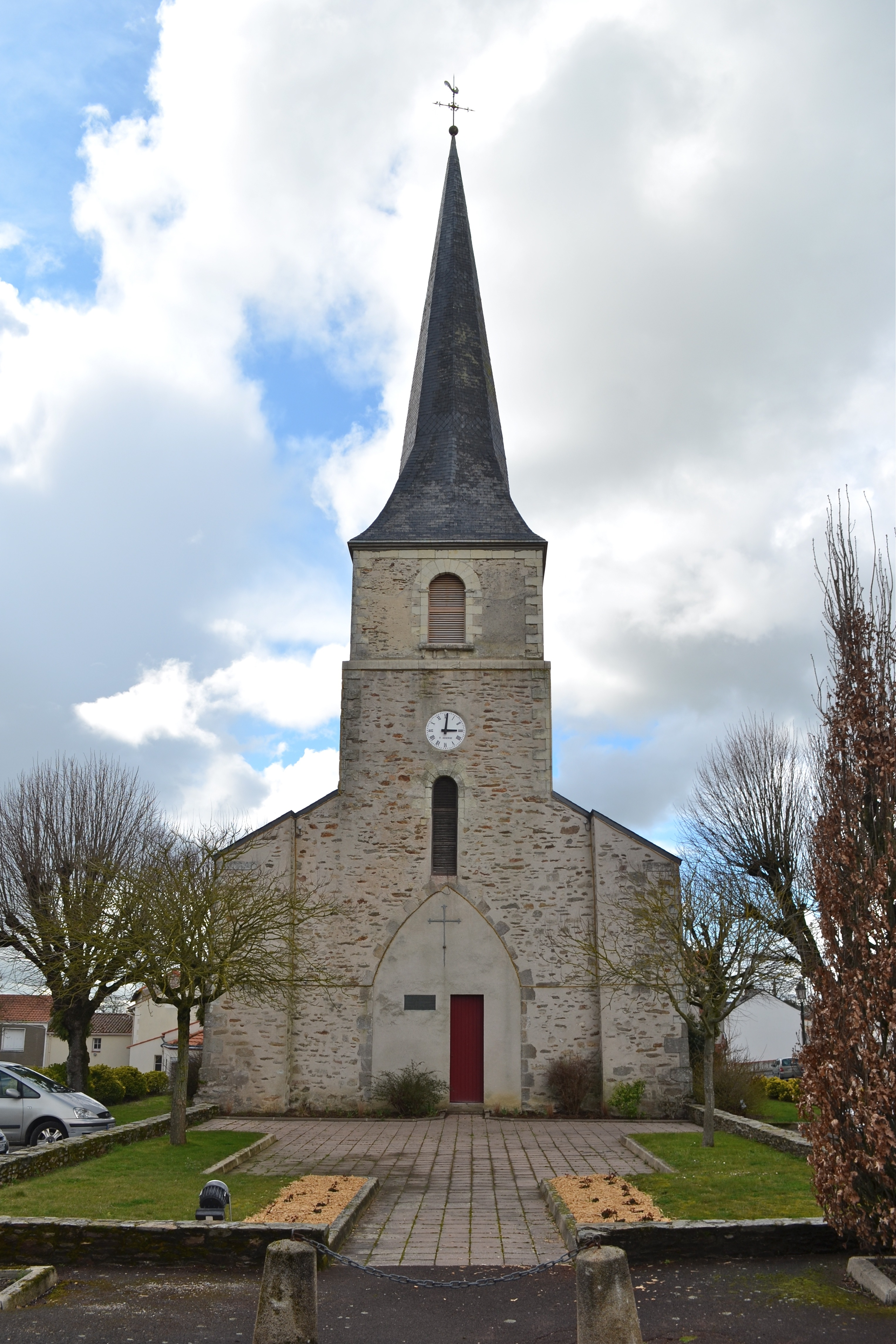
The isolated bell tower, last vestige of the Romanesque church of Saint-Étienne-de-Mer-Morte

After entrusting the castellany of Saint-Étienne-de-Mer-Morte to René de La Suze in 1434, Gilles de Rais changed his mind and reclaimed it in an act of force, managing to keep his property by reaching a subsequent agreement with his younger brother in Nantes on 15 January 1439. But Gilles de Rais again alienated Saint-Étienne-de-Mer-Morte following a transaction with Geoffroy Le Ferron, treasurer and trusted servant of John V, Duke of Brittany. This ducal officer then entrusted the administration of the castellany to his brother Jean Le Ferron, a high-ranking tonsured cleric. Gilles de Rais tried once more to reclaim the castle, this time to sell it to his cousin, the Sire de Vieillevigne, but Jean Le Ferron resisted.

In retaliation, on Pentecost or the day after, 15 or 16 May 1440, Gilles de Rais ambushed a troop of fifty to sixty men in a wood near Saint-Étienne-de-Mer-Morte. He entered the parish church armed and interrupted the mass of the religious officiant Jean Le Ferron, insulting the latter and threatening to kill him with a guisarme if he did not leave the sanctuary. Frightened, the cleric followed in the footsteps of Marquis Lenano de Ceva, a Piemontese captain in Gilles de Rais's service. After opening the gates of the Saint-Étienne-de-Mer-Morte castle to his assailants, Jean Le Ferron was imprisoned there. Gilles de Rais also had other ducal agents, such as Jean Rousseau, sergeant-general of the duchy of Brittany, roughed up or arrested.

In doing so, Gilles de Rais undermined both divine and ducal majesties at once. He committed sacrilege by violating ecclesiastical immunities and challenged ducal authority by laying hands on the Duke's servants, all within the diocese of Nantes, whose bishop, Jean de Malestroit, was the influential chancellor of Brittany. As historian Joël Cornette notes, Malestroit was "the man actually responsible for the duchy's political direction."

John V condemned his vassal to return the stronghold to Jean Le Ferron, under penalty of a fine of 50,000 gold écus. Gilles de Rais then had his prisoners taken to Tiffauges, a fortress outside Brittany's jurisdiction, as it fell within Poitou. In July 1440, he went to Josselin to meet his suzerain John V, but the content of their discussions remains unknown. According to François Prelati's later confession, Gilles de Rais wished then to guarantee his own freedom before risking an interview with the Duke of Brittany. Gilles would have asked his Italian invoker to repeatedly summon the "devil named Barron" in a meadow near Josselin, to question the evil spirit about John V's intentions.

==== Ecclesiastical and secular investigations ====
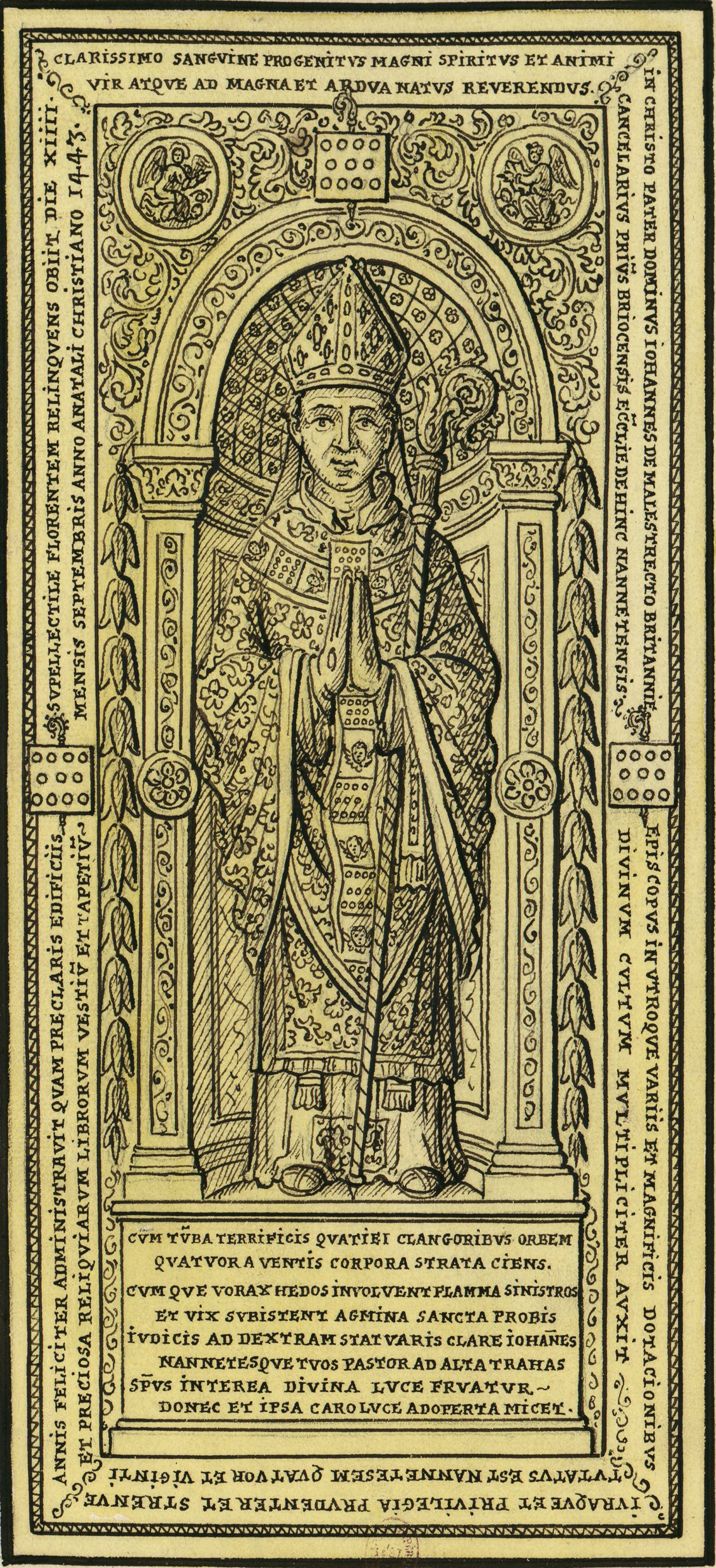
Drawing of Jean de Malestroit's tomb effigy, 1695, BnF

Probably shortly after the act of force in Saint-Étienne-de-Mer-Morte, a secret investigation (inquisitio infamiae) was opened by the ecclesiastical justice system. The inquisitorial system proceedings usually began with an information phase aimed at gathering testimony on a person's fama, in other words, on his reputation established by rumour within a legal framework. As a result, the Bishop Jean de Malestroit made a pastoral visit to his diocese of Nantes, starting with the parish of Notre-Dame, home to the Hôtel de la Suze, Gilles de Rais's residence. The Bishop wanted to find out more about the infamous rumours of missing children in the vicinity of the baron's residences. The results of the ecclesiastical investigation were published on 29 July 1440 in the form of letters patent by Malestroit: Gilles de Rais was accused by public rumour of raping and murdering numerous children, as well as of demonic invocations and pacts. At the same time, the secular justice system proceeded to hear the same witnesses as part of the investigation conducted by the cleric Jean de Touscheronde on behalf of Pierre de L'Hôpital, universal Judge of Brittany.

On 24 August 1440, Duke John V held talks in Vannes with his brother Arthur de Richemont, Constable of France. Compromised in the Praguerie against King Charles VII in the spring of 1440, the Duke of Brittany wanted to obtain a promise of mutual assistance from Richemont, a great royal officer. To this end, John V granted his brother the land of Bourgneuf-en-Retz, owned by Gilles de Rais. Richemont then returned to the crown lands of France and seized Tiffauges, freeing the hostage Jean Le Ferron.

Gilles de Rais was summoned to appear before the ecclesiastical court of Nantes, on charges of "murdering children, sodomy, invoking demons, offending the Divine Majesty and heresy". Two days later, on 15 September 1440, he was arrested at his Machecoul castle by Jean Labbé, a captain in arms in the service of the Duke of Brittany. Among the accused were cleric François Prelati, priest Eustache Blanchet, servants Henriet Griart and Étienne Corillaut, known as "Poitou", as well as Tiphaine Branchu and Perrine Martin, known as "la Meffraye", two women accused of being child providers. Probably already on the run, Gilles de Sillé and Roger de Briqueville were not apprehended. Gilles de Rais was imprisoned in the Château des ducs de Bretagne in the city of Nantes.

==== Trial and execution ====
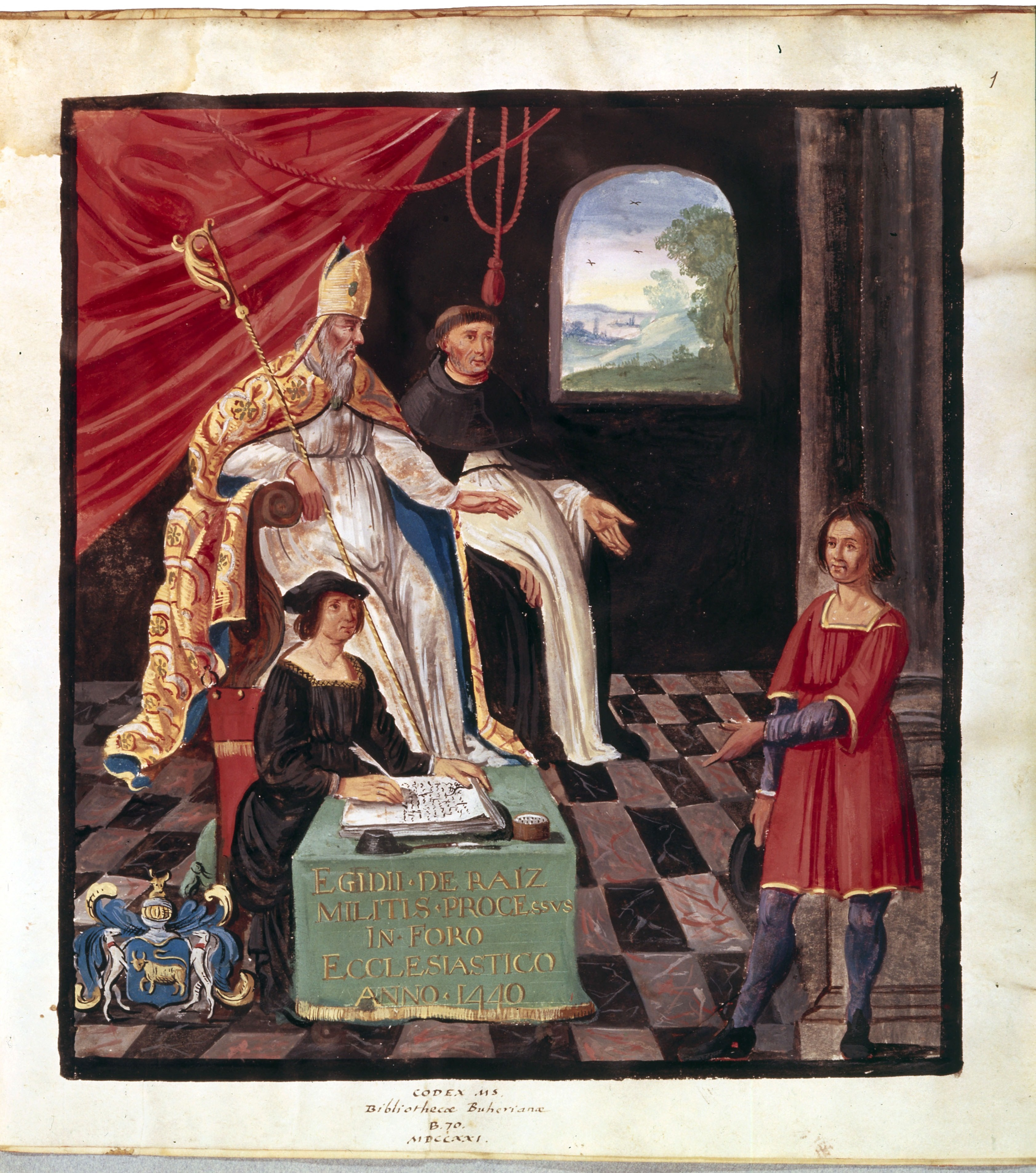
The trial of Gilles de Rais (17th-century miniature)

Gilles de Rais was prosecuted in both secular and ecclesiastical courts on charges that included murder, sodomy, and heresy.

The extensive witness testimony convinced the judges that there were adequate grounds to establish the guilt of the accused. After Gilles de Rais admitted to the charges on 21 October, the court cancelled a plan to torture him into confessing. Peasants of neighbouring villages had earlier begun to make accusations that their children had entered Gilles de Rais's castle begging for food and were never seen again.

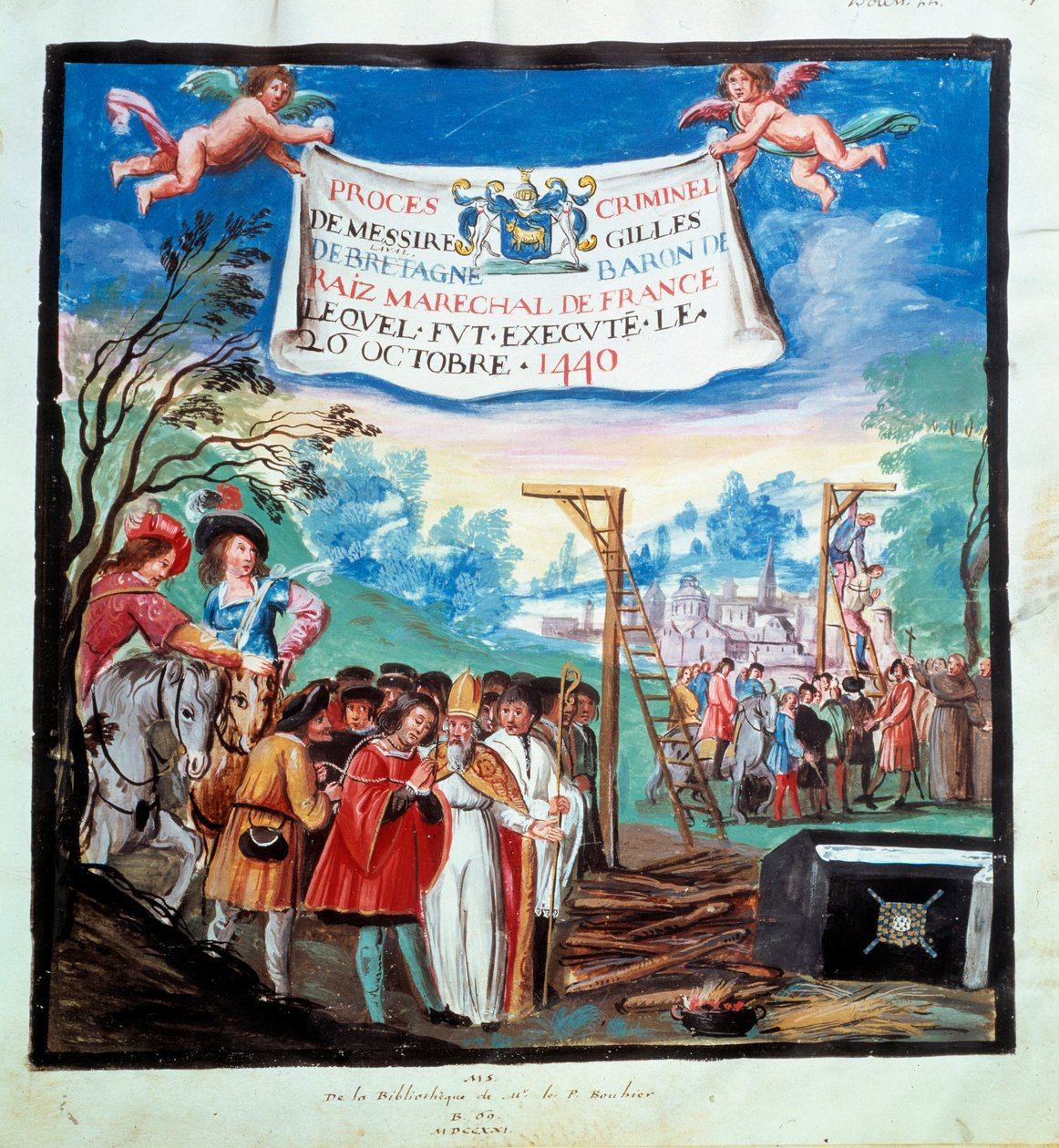
The execution of Gilles de Rais (16th-century miniature)

On 23 October 1440, the secular court heard the confessions of Poitou and Henriet and condemned them both to death, followed by Gilles de Rais's death sentence on 25 October. The sentence of the ecclesiastical court imputes to him the murders of "one hundred and forty children, or more" while the sentence of the secular court did not give an exact number of victims, mentioning the murders of "several small children." Gilles de Rais was allowed to make a confession, and his request to be buried in the church of the monastery of Notre-Dame des Carmes in Nantes was granted.

Execution by hanging and burning was set for Wednesday 26 October. At nine o‘clock, Gilles de Rais and his two accomplices proceeded to the place of execution on the Ile de Biesse. Gilles de Rais is said to have addressed the crowd with contrite piety and exhorted Henriet and Poitou to die bravely and think only of salvation. His request to be the first to die had been granted the day before. At eleven o'clock, the brush at the platform was set afire and Gilles de Rais was hanged. His body was cut down before being consumed by the flames and claimed by "four ladies of high rank" for burial. Henriet and Poitou were executed in similar fashion but their bodies were reduced to ashes in the flames and then scattered.

== Historiography ==
=== Hypothetical portraits ===
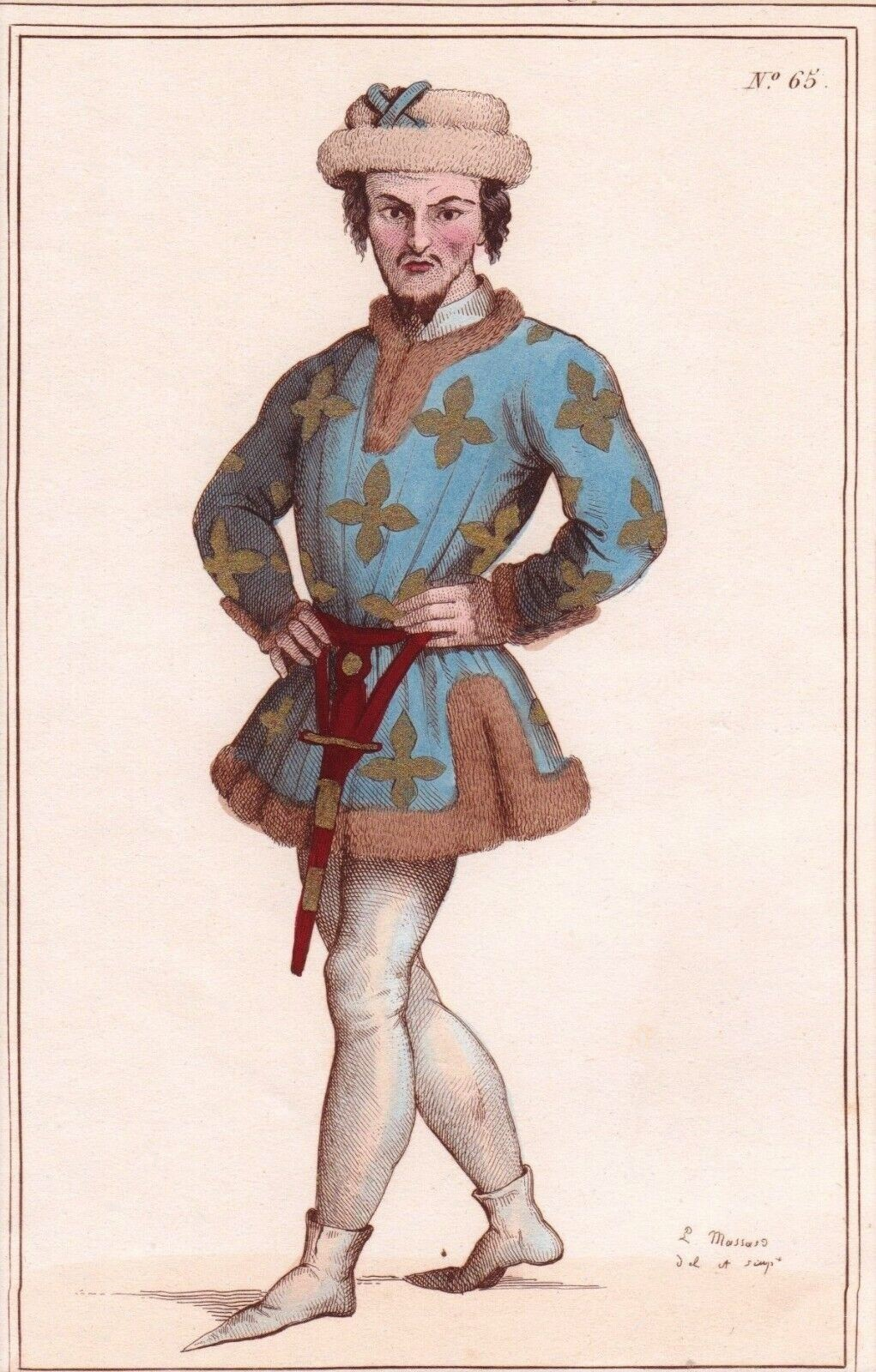
Gilles de Laval Seigneur de Retz, color plate by Léopold Massard in Paul Lacroix's book, Costumes historiques de la France d'après les monuments les plus authentiques..., 1852

No contemporary description or portrait of Gilles de Rais has survived. All illuminations, engravings, and paintings depicting him are posthumous and imaginary. In their French translation of Gilles de Rais's "judicial confession" in the Latin trial records, Georges Bataille and Pierre Klossowski had him state that he had "always been of a delicate nature" in his youth. French writer Michel Hérubel interpreted this phrase as referring to his physical appearance, but historian Matei Cazacu argues that Bataille and Klossowski's translation was somewhat hasty, as the adjective delicatus carried a range of connotations, including "charming, refined, luxurious, effeminate, gallant, and licentious".

The first known description of Gilles de Rais, portraying him as "a man of good understanding, good looks and good manners", appeared in Bertrand d'Argentré's Histoire de Bretaigne (1582). Essayist Michel Meurger notes that "the judicial Gilles de Rais, a faceless man who eludes historical psychology, first acquires a body and a mind" in this work, marking the beginning of a long process by which Gilles de Rais would be repeatedly reimagined by later generations.

In 1841, Jules Michelet devoted a famous four-page portrait to Gilles de Rais in the fifth volume of his Histoire de France. He reproduced Bertrand d'Argentré's apocryphal description in full without naming its author, instead attributing it to an unspecified tradition. Michelet thereby popularized the image of Gilles de Rais as an intelligent nobleman of handsome appearance and refined manners: "He was, it is said, a lord 'of good understanding, good looks and good manners'". In 1863, French archivist and historian Auguste Vallet de Viriville further enriched this portrait with additional fictional details: "He was a handsome young man, graceful, petulant, with a lively, playful spirit, but weak and frivolous."

By the late nineteenth century, medical and literary discourse had transformed Gilles de Rais into a larger-than-life pathological figure, an image epitomized by Joris-Karl Huysmans's portrayal of him in the novel Là-bas (1891) as a learned, Faustian nobleman.[12] By contrast, in 1959, French philosopher and intellectual Georges Bataille portrayed Gilles de Rais as an archaic, infantile, and foolish feudal lord unconstrained by moral scruples or any limits on his power, driven by a "monstrous Herostratus complex", yet also as a "sacred monster", one "accustomed by war to the voluptuousness of blood."

=== Question of guilt ===
==== Doubts about the verdict in the Age of Enlightenment tradition ====
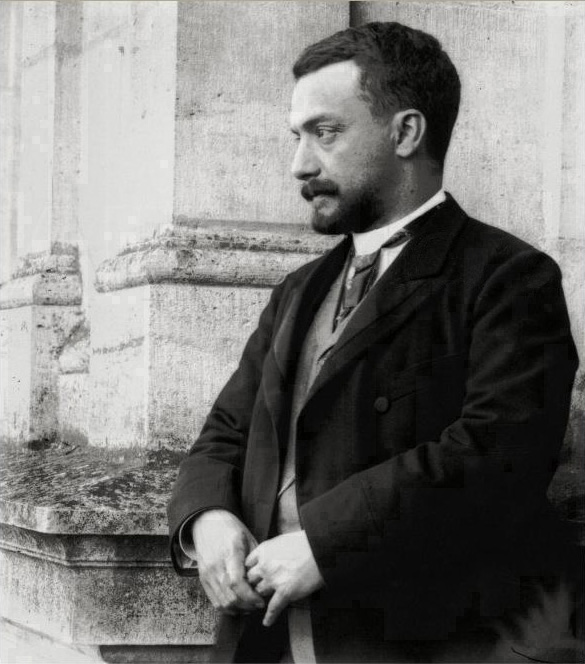
Between 1902 and 1912, Salomon Reinach argued that Gilles de Rais was innocent.

In his Essai sur les mœurs et l'esprit des nations (1756), Voltaire referred laconically to Gilles de Rais as a supplicant who had been "accused of magic, and of having slit the throats of children to use their blood for alleged enchantments." Although he expressed reservations about Gilles de Rais's guilt, Voltaire avoided taking a definitive position on the matter. His brief mention of the trial of October 1440, among other medieval trials for heresy and witchcraft, essentially allowed the French philosophe to vilify "fanaticism composed of superstition and ignorance", a flaw he considered to be of all times, but which particularly characterized his conception of the obscurantist Middle Ages as opposed to the Age of Enlightenment.

In a short passage from their work L'art de vérifier les dates des faits historiques, des chartes, des chroniques et autres anciens monuments, depuis la naissance de Notre-Seigneur... (1784), Benedictines from the Congregation of Saint Maur seemed to concur with Voltaire's opinion, also proposing superstition as a plausible cause of Gilles de Rais's execution. These monks initially asserted that Gilles de Rais "disgraced himself in Brittany by infamous deeds that aroused the public's cries against him." But then, abandoning the affirmative tone, they used terms similar to Voltairean prose when they evoked the procession of "alleged soothsayers and magicians" possibly responsible for the "horrors" imputed to Gilles de Rais, "horrors of which he was perhaps not guilty."

Between 1902 and 1912, Gilles de Rais's innocence was proclaimed by Salomon Reinach, a French archaeologist and historian of religion. His thesis was developed "in a particular context, where debates on the religious question, the memory of the Dreyfus Affair, and the reassurance of the scientific spirit are pushing for a 'rehabilitation' in line with the zeitgeist," explained historian Pierre Savy. Back then, Reinach's assertions were "sternly criticized" by historian Noël Valois in 1912.

In the Voltairean tradition, French poet and writer Fernand Fleuret followed in Reinach's footsteps with the same anti-clerical interpretation to defend Gilles de Rais's innocence in 1921. For the occasion, Fleuret adopted the pseudonym "Dr. Ludovico Hernandez" to give his essay scientific credence.

==== Occultist interpretations ====
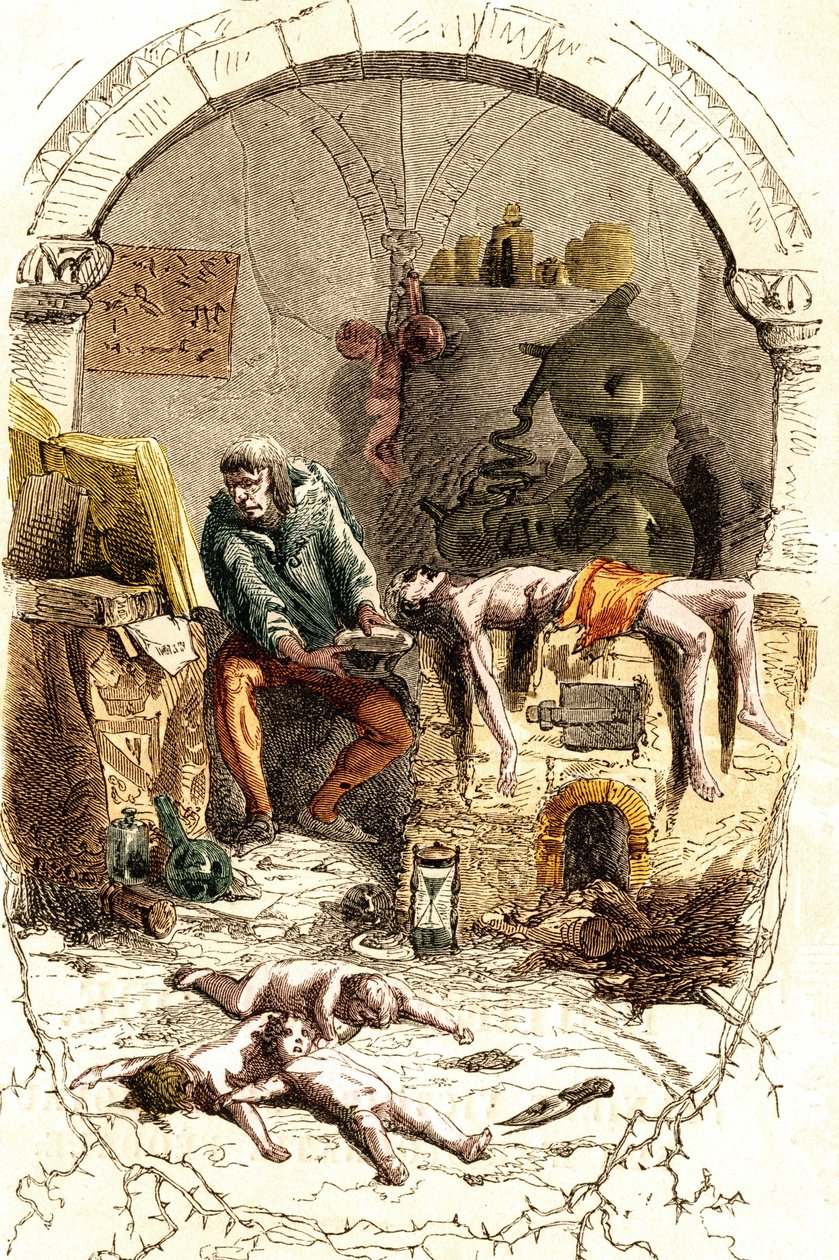
Print depicting the amalgam between alchemy and black magic: Gilles de Rais collects the blood of his victims in a laboratory filled with an athanor, retorts, alembics and grimoires (engraving by Valentin Foulquier, 1862).

In the 20th century, anthropologist Margaret Murray and occultist Aleister Crowley questioned the involvement of the ecclesiastic and secular authorities in the case. During a conference (known as the "Forbidden Conference") held in Oxford in 1930, Crowley argued for the innocence of Gilles de Rais, whom he portrayed as a victim of the Catholic Church. The occultist described him as "in almost every respect ... the male equivalent of Joan of Arc", whose main crime was "the pursuit of knowledge".

Murray, who propagated the witch-cult hypothesis, speculated in her book The Witch-Cult in Western Europe that Gilles de Rais was really a witch and an adherent of a fertility cult centred on the pagan goddess Diana.

Most historians reject Murray's theory. Norman Cohn argues that it is inconsistent with what is known of Gilles de Rais's crimes and trial. Historians do not regard Gilles de Rais as a martyr to a pre-Christian religion; other scholars tend to view him as a lapsed Catholic who descended into crime and depravity, and whose real crimes were coincidental to the land forfeitures.

==== Georges Bataille's interpretations ====
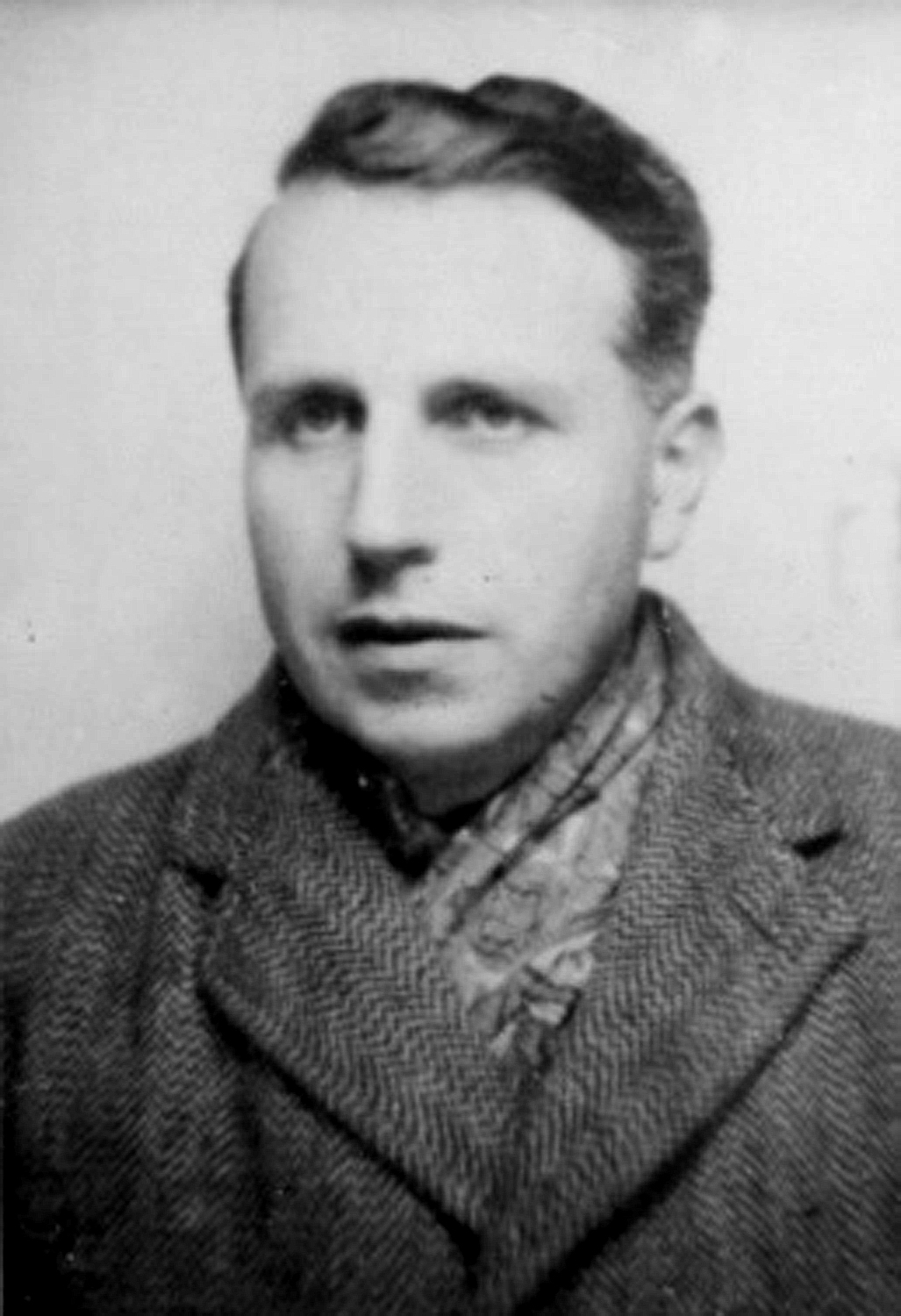
Georges Bataille

In 1959, Georges Bataille co-edited with Pierre Klossowski a modern French translation of the 1440 trial proceedings. The book included as well an introduction and a lengthy appendix in which Bataille retraced Gilles de Rais's life.

Bataille argued that Gilles de Rais's sexual crimes are "indubitable" because "15th-century judges could not have devised a plot so complex and exact in its perversity", sums up French historian Yves-Marie Bercé.

For Bataille, understanding such criminal behaviour, and thus being able to moralize the story, remained impossible in medieval times without the later assistance of Marquis de Sade and Sigmund Freud, whose works "explore these abysses" and "force humanity to recognize their existence, to designate, to name these virtualities", adds Bercé. The latter concludes that Bataille's historical approach was probably coupled with a "personal exorcism" linked to his own obsession with transgression and horror. This would explain Bataille's need to believe in Gilles de Rais's guilt, in order "to cope with the vertigo that the twentieth century gave him", says medievalist Jacques Chiffoleau.

==== 1992 mock re-trial ====
In 1992, French poet and novelist Gilbert Prouteau published a book imagining a modern re-trial of Gilles de Rais, juxtaposition of narrative texts, excerpts from minutes, romanticized letters and a fictitious diary kept by Gilles de Rais, presented as an alchemical scholar, alcoholic and aesthete apologist for pedophilia. Prouteau then arranged several publicity events. In November 1992, he organized an unofficial mock trial of Gilles de Rais in the Clemenceau Hall, a hall set up to host commissions, colloquia and conferences at the Luxembourg Palace, to re-examine the source material and evidence available at the medieval trial. Prouteau led an informal "Court of Arbitration" consisting of lawyers, writers, former French ministers, parliament members, a biologist and a medical doctor before Judge Henri Juramy, who found Gilles de Rais not guilty. Commenters noted several inaccuracies, as none of the participants sought professional advice from qualified medievalists.

Medievalist Michel Balard criticized the promoters of the rehabilitation attempt, who sought "the sensational, the pathetic, the sulphurous" to the detriment of scientific history, "less spectacular ... but more respectful of documents and more aware of the possibilities and limits of historical inquiry." According to medievalist Jean Kerhervé, Prouteau has not appeared to research primary source material, and his knowledge of the history of religion, law, and medieval institutions, particularly in relation to the Duchy of Brittany, is regularly challenged. Medievalist Olivier Bouzy also points out several other errors and rough approximations, even biased inventions deliberately forged for the purposes of rehabilitation. For the archivist-paleographer Matei Cazacu, the syllogism brandished to exonerate Gilles de Rais ("The Inquisition persecuted the innocent. One of Gilles de Rais's judges was an inquisitor. So Gilles de Rais was the innocent victim of the Inquisition") is reminiscent of the logician character in Eugène Ionesco's play Rhinoceros. The journalist Gilbert Philippe of Ouest-France subsequently declared Prouteau "facetious and provocative", claiming further that Prouteau himself thought the retrial was "a monumental farce" pulled off with some "high-ranking buddies", according to the Vendée writer Jean de Raigniac.

==== Contemporary academic views ====
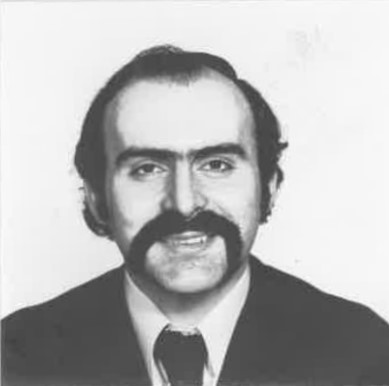
Matei Cazacu, historian and archivist-paleographer, is convinced that Gilles de Rais was a serial killer

The "vast majority" of historians "believed in the truth of Gilles de Rais's crimes", notes medievalist Jacques Chiffoleau. In particular, medievalists Olivier Bouzy and Jacques Heers, like Matei Cazacu, are convinced of Gilles de Rais's guilt. Likewise, for medievalist Valérie Toureille, the numerous testimonies of the parents make it impossible to "bank on the innocence of Gilles de Rais" despite the material interests of John V, Duke of Brittany, and his chancellor Jean de Malestroit, Bishop of Nantes. Medievalist Claude Gauvard also emphasizes that "the historian ... is not a judge. He can only point out certain contradictions in the trial, transformations between the initial depositions of the witnesses and the charges developed by the judges, but he must also affirm that facts are stubborn things. Given the initial witness accounts on which the investigation was based, the abduction of male children is no mere rumour" in spite of the exaggerated number of victims. She adds that historians do not "subscribe to the conspiracy theory that these two trials were a plot" orchestrated by Malestroit and the Duke of Brittany.

Notwithstanding the realistic and detailed nature of the confessions of Gilles de Rais and his servants, these texts are not accurate shorthand accounts, says Jacques Chiffoleau, but after-the-fact reconstructions written according to the medieval inquisitorial system of "highly regulated interrogations, composed of questions worked out in advance, [transcribing oral depositions in accordance] with the classificatory and scholastic writing of notaries and judges, the eventual use of torture to get to a confession that is most often no more than a homologation of what the prosecution proposes."

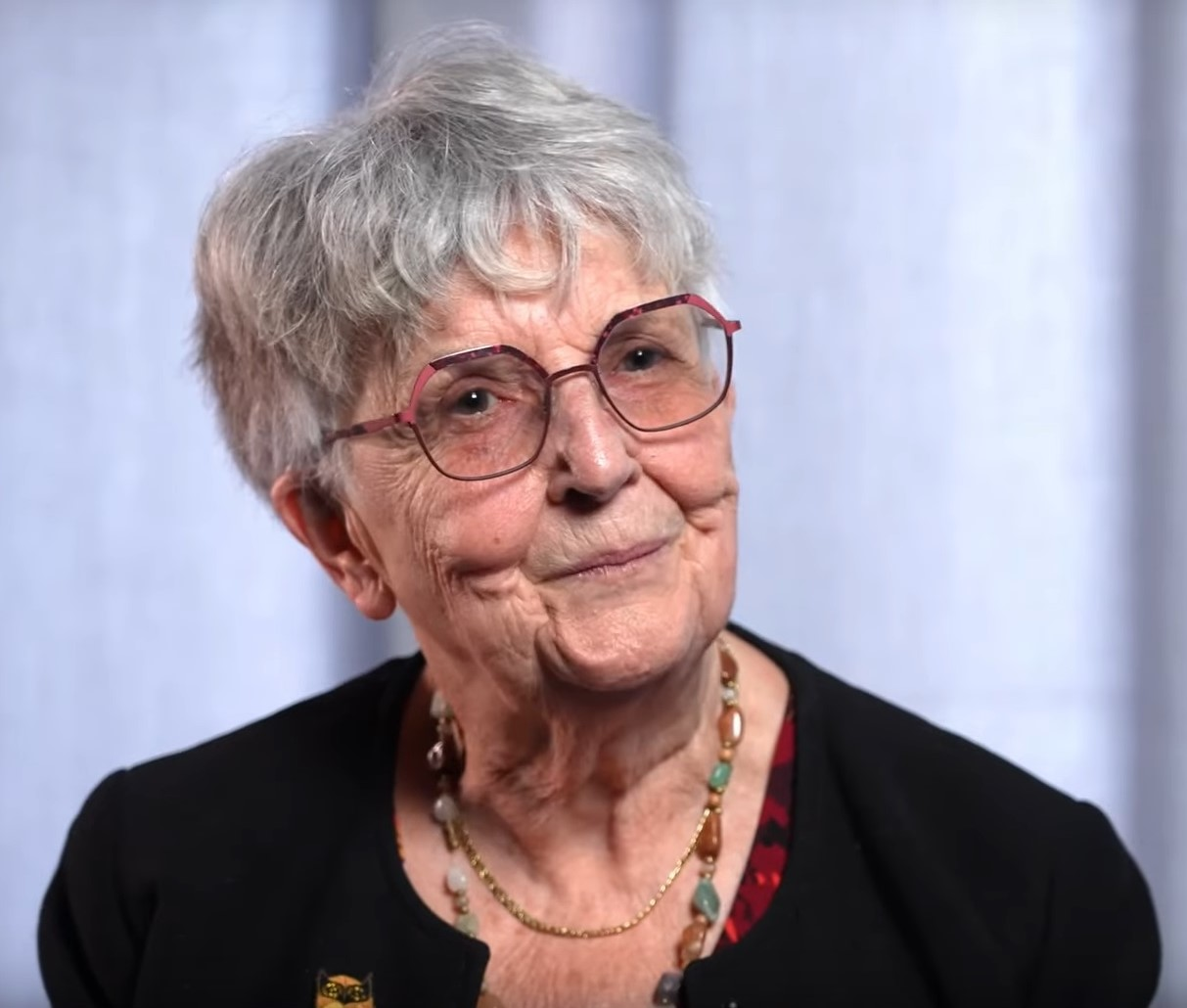
Medievalist Claude Gauvard is careful not to read Gilles de Rais's trial proceedings literally. She nevertheless dismisses the conspiracy theory about a frameup

With these clarifications made, Jacques Chiffoleau insists that he is not trying to prove Gilles de Rais's innocence or guilt, but rather to explain "the weight of the proceedings" and the judges' "strong views" on lese-majesty offence. In the Breton magistrates' eyes, the criminal charges against John V's treacherous vassal constituted "a very old triptych that closely entwined" rebellion against the established order (which stemmed from the divine order), deal with the Devil and "unnatural relations" such as sodomy.

Similarly, Claude Gauvard stresses that confessions were shaped by the expectations of judges, whose imagination was imbued with the "fear of a demonological epidemic" contemporary with the beginnings of the witch hunts in the Late Middle Ages. Gauvard, therefore, considers it "difficult, if not impossible" to "distinguish between what is fantasy" in these confessions, since "the description of the facts is insidiously rooted in reality."

However, Jacques Chiffoleau admits to being puzzled by certain vivid passages from Étienne Corrillaut's confession of 17 October 1440, in which Gilles de Rais's servant detailed some assassination methods. (Note: "The said Gilles de Rais sometimes boasted that he had greater delight in killing and slitting the throats of the said boys and girls or having them killed, in seeing them languish and die, in cutting off their heads and limbs and seeing the blood, than in practicing lust on them. (...) After the incision of the vein of the neck and throat of the said children or of other parts of the body and when the blood flowed and also after the decapitation, practiced as it is said above, he sometimes sat on their belly and took delight in seeing them die thus and he sat at an angle to better see their end and their death." (Transcript of Étienne Corrillaut's confession, dated 17 October 1440)) These descriptions of bloody and orgasmic rituals have no equivalent in every inquisitorial interrogation studied by Chiffoleau, because in this case the trial documents record murders and sadistic pleasures that had never been put down on paper before Marquis de Sade's literary work in the 18th century.

=== Psychopathological and criminological interpretations ===
==== Late nineteenth-century medico-moral interpretations ====
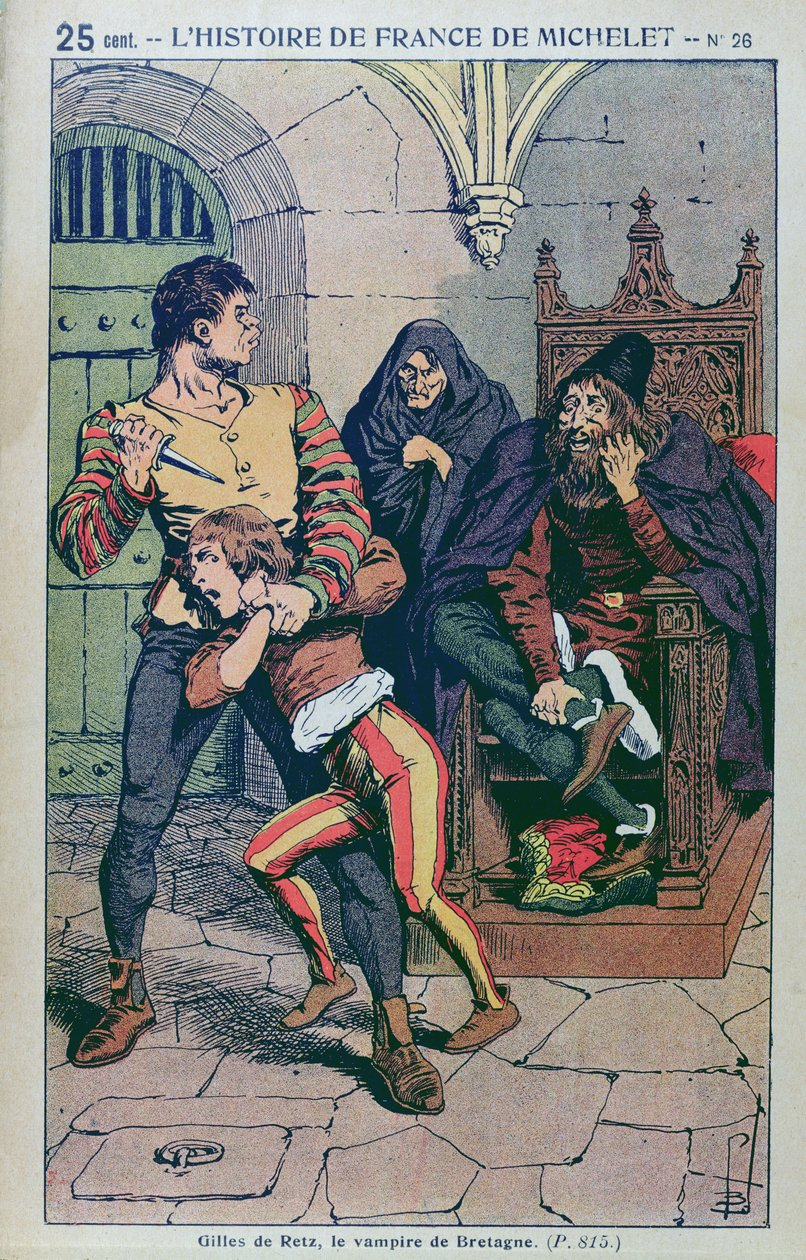
Gilles de Rais, "the Vampire of Brittany", La Meffraye and the murderous servant, as seen by the French artist Louis Bombled for a popular edition of Jules Michelet's Histoire de France (c. 1900)

During the nineteenth century, several authors, notably Jules Michelet, referred to Gilles de Rais as a "vampire", a term then used in the sense of "necrophile". The designation "vampire" tended at the time to eclipse "necrophile" within "a specific cultural context shaped by the influence of crime reporting, a fascination with criminal and sexual deviance, and sensibilities drawn to the macabre and the fantastique," as researcher Amandine Malivin notes.

In parallel, the final decades of the nineteenth century witnessed the rapid development of sexual psychopathology in Europe and a flourishing body of scholarly literature devoted to the clinical classification of "sexual perversions", whether considered benign or criminal. Medievalist Zrinka Stahuljak observes that "preoccupations with criminality, criminal responsibility, and penal law brought to the surface the links between madness and crime". The most influential work of this period was German-Austrian psychiatrist Richard von Krafft-Ebing's Psychopathia Sexualis (1886), whose chapter on sexual sadism invokes Gilles de Rais. The book had a profound influence on subsequent scholarship concerning him.

By the late nineteenth century, the medical taxonomies of cruelty, obsession, and perversion had reshaped contemporary understandings of recidivism and, more broadly, paved the way for a new criminal category that foreshadowed the modern concept of the "serial killer". In Vacher l'Éventreur et les crimes sadiques (1899), French criminologist Alexandre Lacassagne identified the "great sadists" who committed "repeated crimes", among whom he included Jack the Ripper, Joseph Vacher, and Gilles de Rais. The image of the rebellious fifteenth-century heretic gave way to that of the sadistic criminal, a transformation shaped by scientific and journalistic narratives at this pivotal moment in the history of criminology. Gilles de Rais came to be identified with the "monsters" depicted in the crime reports of Le Petit Journal and La Gazette des tribunaux.

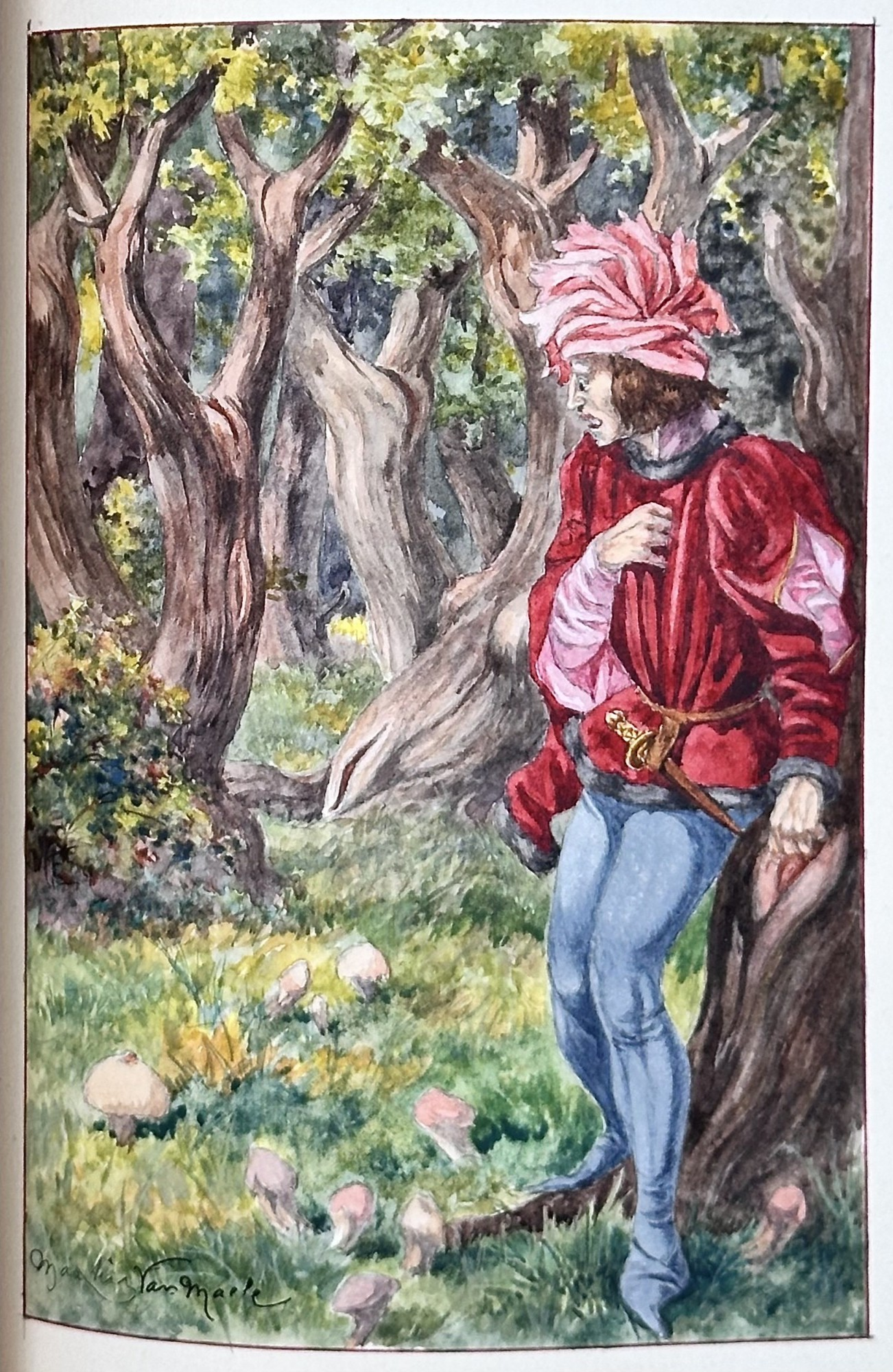
The forest of Tiffauges, perceived as perverted through Gilles de Rais's eyes. Watercolor by Martin van Maële for the novel Là-bas by Joris-Karl Huysmans (1891)

Physicians and historians of medicine sought to establish their discipline as an authoritative means of interpreting the past through the study of prominent historical figures. Gilles de Rais and Joan of Arc became the subjects of retrospective diagnoses based on the psychiatric theories of the period. The former was portrayed as a "criminal degenerate" and a "born invert", embodying a supposedly corrupt and decadent medieval aristocracy, whereas the latter, a young peasant woman who claimed to hear voices, was elevated to the status of a popular genius capable of regenerating the nation.

This approach emerged within the intellectual milieu of the late nineteenth-century French school of forensic medicine, several of whose representatives promoted the possibility of the "physical and moral regeneration" of humanity through public hygiene and eugenics. The pathological contrast drawn between Joan of Arc and Gilles de Rais, closely associating genius with madness, was thus mobilized in support of the theory of degeneration, according to which the history of the French people was shaped by alternating phases of decline and regeneration. Such a medico-moral reading reflected fin de siècle anxieties surrounding national decline and the perceived collapse of civilizations.

Historian Angus McLaren notes that this body of medical literature was often lacking in scientific rigor. As a result, Gilles de Rais and the cannibal Antoine Léger were frequently grouped indiscriminately with sadists and sexual murderers in superficial and fetishistic collections of clinical cases, presented as brief moralizing biographies.

==== Influence of literature on medical interpretations ====
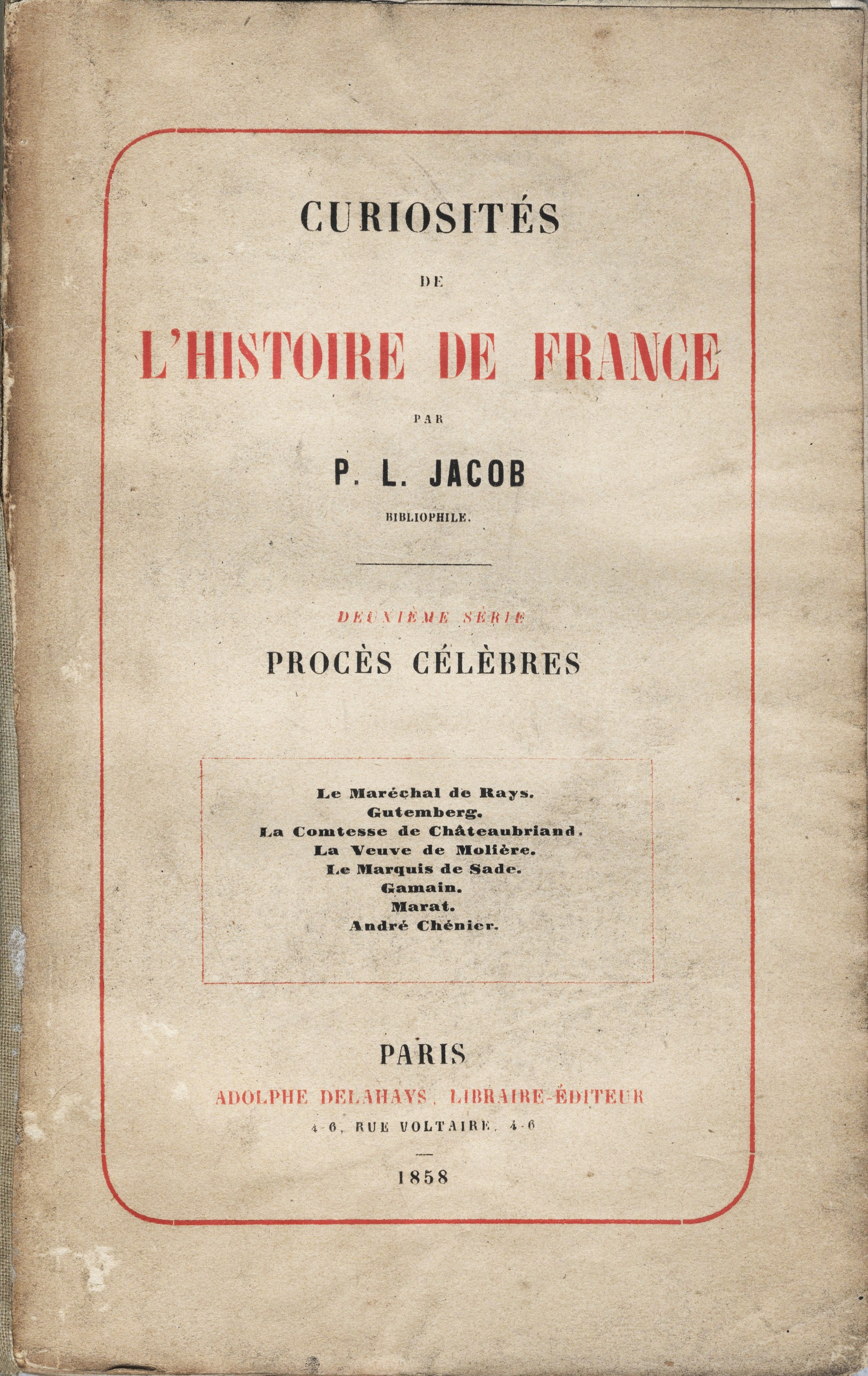
Paul Lacroix's Curiosités de l'histoire de France (1858).

The original records of the 1440 trial remained largely inaccessible to the general public for a long time, as they were published only gradually and in fragmentary form because of fears of scandal. Given these circumstances, a number of authors relied uncritically on Paul Lacroix's Curiosités de l'histoire de France (1858), a largely fictionalized account of the trial. This pseudo-historical work, embellished with imaginative details intended to captivate readers, also influenced certain physicians in the late nineteenth and early twentieth centuries.

Psychiatrists such as Richard von Krafft-Ebing and Albert Moll attributed Gilles de Rais's sadism to his reading of a manuscript of Suetonius, whose miniatures depicted Roman emperors committing sexual violence against children. This interpretation, however, stemmed from a literary invention by Paul Lacroix, since no source records the presence of such a manuscript in the baron's library. As medievalist Zrinka Stahuljak observes, "fiction helped Gilles move from historical discourse into medical discourse": Lacroix's dramatic narrative conveniently provided physicians with a scientific explanation for Gilles de Rais's crimes.

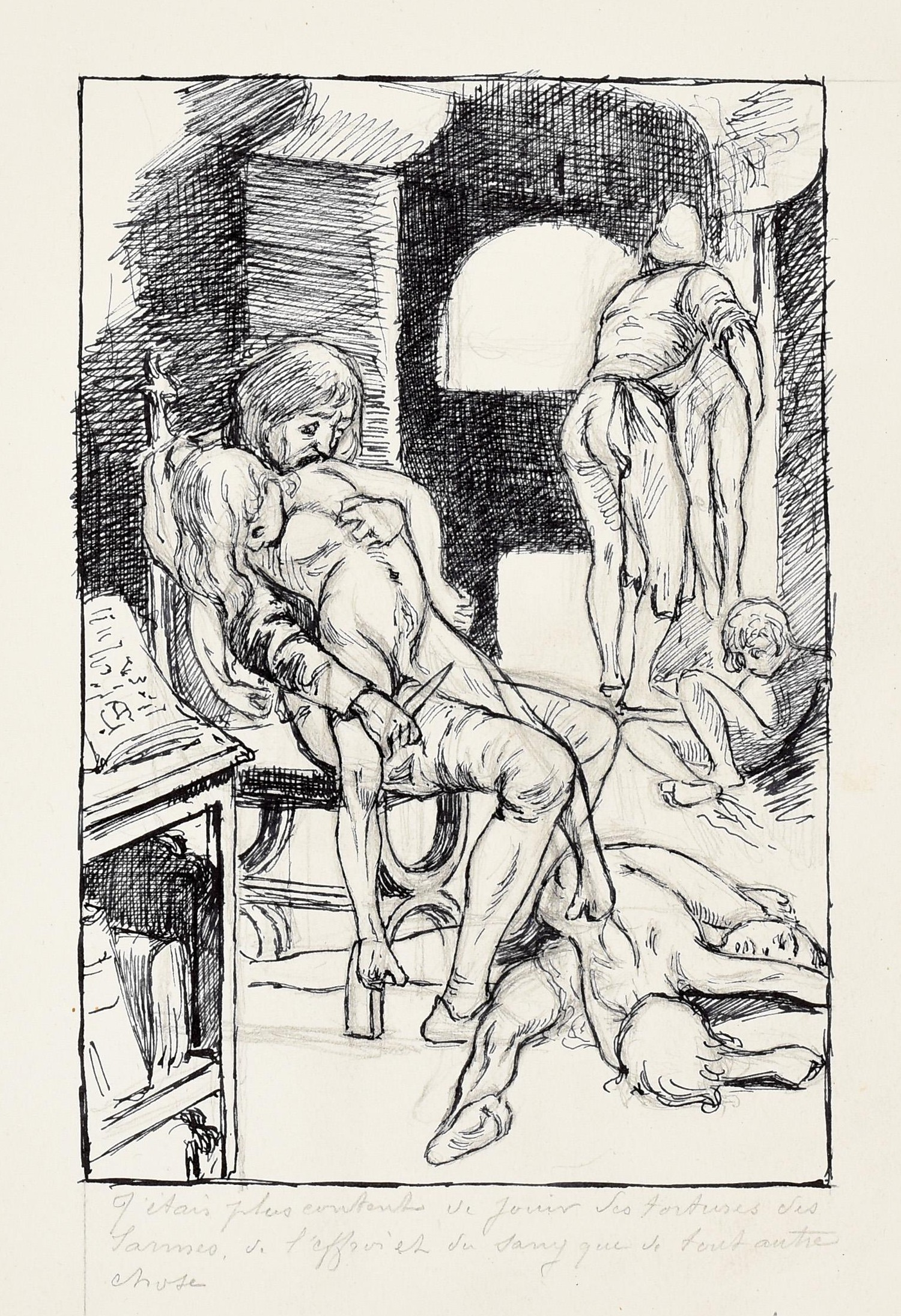
The atrocities of Gilles de Rais. Drawing belonging to a series of illustrations presumably commissioned by a bibliophile from Martin van Maële to adorn a copy of Joris-Karl Huysmans's novel, Là-bas (1891)

The fictional illuminated manuscript of Suetonius also helped perpetuate the legend of Gilles de Rais as a cultivated, even learned, nobleman. Among physicians, Gilles de Rais came to embody the figure of the "superior degenerate". His supposed intelligence, artistic refinement, and literary interests were interpreted as signs of a pathological mind capable of "intricate and sophisticated crimes". Contemporary medical discourse, intertwined with the "excesses of rhetoric and fiction" surrounding fantasies and mystifications about Gilles de Rais's sexuality, thus "contributed to the reification of his ultra-romantic legend" as an exceptional figure.

Abbé Eugène Bossard's doctoral thesis in letters, Gilles de Rais, maréchal de France, dit « Barbe-Bleue » (1885), marked a major historiographical milestone in the study of its subject. Its colourful narrative style, inspired by Jules Michelet's Romantic historical writing, reflects the uneasy coexistence of scholarly documentation and literary imagination. Bossard's thesis consolidated the image of Gilles de Rais as a refined aesthete and "mad artist" ("artiste insensé"). This portrayal found one of its most influential expressions in Joris-Karl Huysmans's novel Là-bas (1891), which drew heavily on Bossard's work and depicted Gilles de Rais as a Faustian man of learning, bibliophile, flamboyant mystic, and arch-sadist.

The notion of sadism, popularized during the 1880s and 1890s, enabled certain authors to express, through the lens of belles-lettres, "an elitist disdain for the conventions of middle class and mass society." The literary figure of the pervert was embodied in literature by refined aristocratic libertines such as the Marquis de Sade and Des Esseintes, among whom Gilles de Rais was also included. Ironically, historian Angus McLaren notes that individuals medically classified at the time as sadistic criminals, such as Joseph Vacher, generally came from the lower classes so feared by writers of the Decadent movement. McLaren concludes that "the "real" sadists, far from being powerful, sexual supermen, were slaves of their own compulsive behavior."

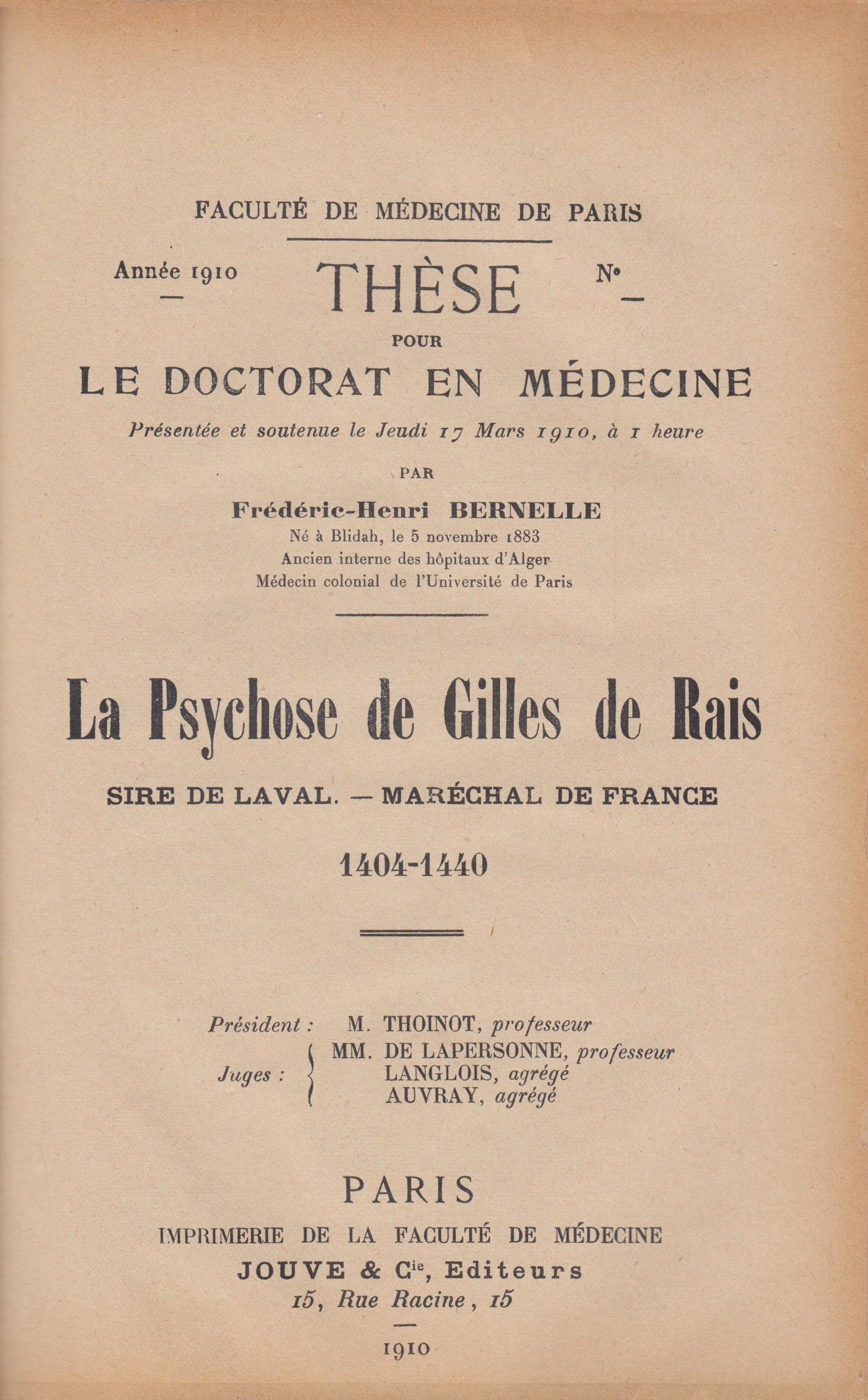
A 1910 published medical thesis on Gilles de Rais

Three medical dissertations devoted to Gilles de Rais appeared between 1910 and 1934. "Thin and disappointing", according to medievalist Jacques Chiffoleau, these studies remained heavily influenced by the literary works of Paul Lacroix and Joris-Karl Huysmans. In 1910, Dr. Augustin Cabanès adopted the pseudonym "Rondelet" to sign an article in which he discoursed on Gilles de Rais's facial tics and bluish beard—details born of the fertile imagination of Paul Lacroix. In 1921, poet and writer Fernand Fleuret, in turn, posed as a certain "Dr. Ludovico Hernandez" on the occasion of publishing an essay on Gilles de Rais. Jacques Chiffoleau observes that "this limited erudition and, above all, the frequent use of pseudonyms ... betray in all these physicians (or essayists claiming to be physicians) aims that are less clearly scientific and perhaps a less forthright desire to appeal to collectors of "curiosa" filled with sex and blood under the guise of medical analysis".

More recently, psychiatrist Marie-Laure Susini, clinical psychologist Nicolas Brémaud, and James Penney, a Canadian professor of cultural studies, have examined the case of Gilles de Rais, drawing on psychoanalysis in their approach to perversion. Jacques Chiffoleau considers that their attempts may offer interesting analytical perspectives, but their "overly literal reading" of the trial records fails to take into account the fundamental role of inquisitorial procedure in the conditions under which these judicial documents were produced. Moreover, they still rely "on the most fictionalized parts of the narratives of Eugène Bossard, Georges Bataille, or even at times Paul Lacroix, without being wary of what these authors themselves projected into them."

==== Gilles de Rais and the category of the serial killer ====
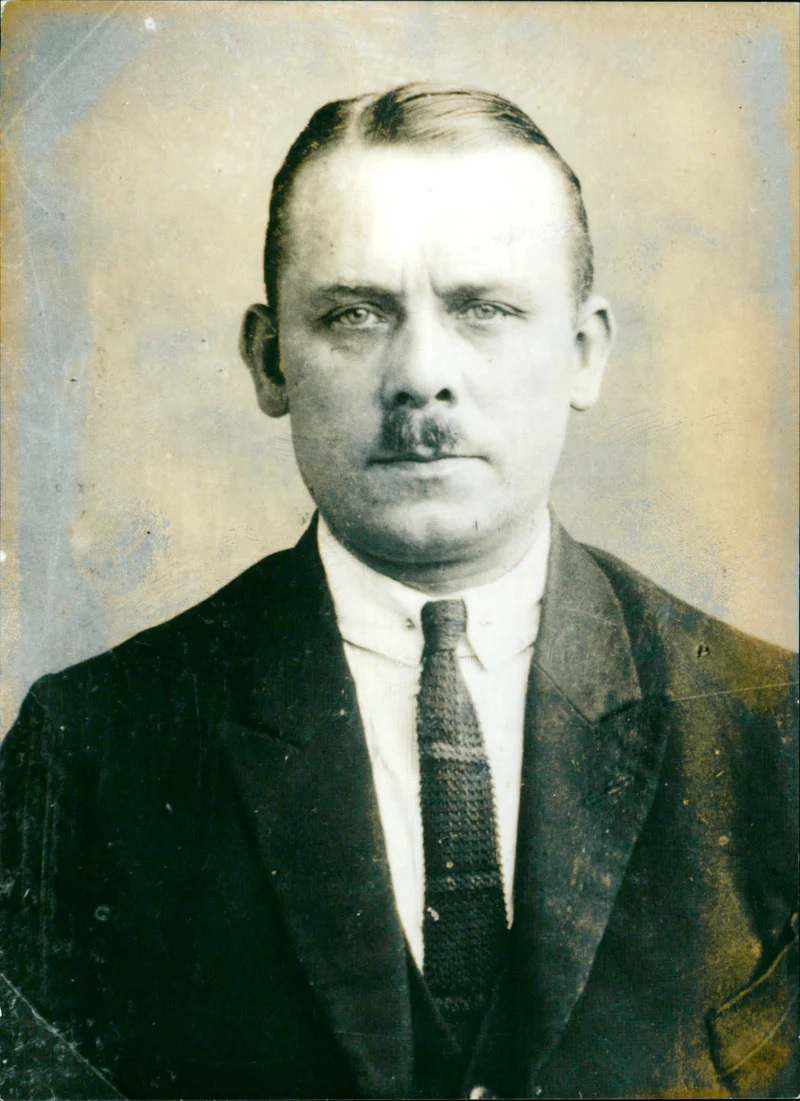
Serial killer Fritz Haarmann, the "Butcher of Hanover", murdered numerous young men during the Weimar Republic. The comparison with Gilles de Rais was first drawn by historian Émile Gabory, and later by essayist Georges Bataille

Modern interpretations of the Gilles de Rais case have drawn on comparisons with serial killers and on concepts such as pedophilia and criminal profiling. The retrospective application of such concepts has itself been discussed by historians and criminologists.

Comparisons between Gilles de Rais and modern serial killers have been invoked to refute claims of his innocence, notably through parallels with figures such as Fritz Haarmann and Andrei Chikatilo. Medievalist Didier Lett, a specialist in the history of childhood and author of a study on pedophilia and child sexual abuse in medieval Bologna, unequivocally defines Gilles de Rais as a "sadistic child sex offender, sodomite, and serial murderer."

Historian and archivist Matei Cazacu identifies several characteristics in Gilles de Rais that criminologists associate with serial killers: the relatively young age at which the killings are thought to have begun (between 27 and 31 years old), a preference for a particular type of victim, especially young boys, as well as the alleged commission of "illicit acts" during childhood and adolescence, and a propensity for aggression and violence displayed from an early age. He further emphasizes the ritualized nature of the crimes, characterized by the repeated use of similar methods of torture and killing, whether carried out directly by Gilles de Rais or by his servants, with the victims treated as mere objects. According to the confessions, these acts included brief hangings followed by a temporary suspension of the abuse under the guise of kindness, neck fractures inflicted with a stick, cuts to the throat or other parts of the body, dismemberment or decapitation with a braquemart, the rape of children who were dying or already dead, a fascination with the display of internal organs following disembowelment, and the contemplation of severed heads.

Cazacu develops a detailed psychological profile of Gilles de Rais using the "analytical framework used by FBI profilers" in a 1990 report and the classification developed by Michel Bénézech, a psychiatrist and professor of forensic medicine at the University of Bordeaux. According to Cazacu, "modern techniques, when available and able to provide useful insights, should not be disregarded." Although he acknowledges criticisms of this approach, he rejects the idea that it necessarily conflates medieval and modern mentalities. He nevertheless admits that "the depths of the human psyche always remain unfathomable and (...) Gilles de Rais took his secret to the grave."

Medievalist Claude Gauvard comments on the use of psychological approaches, observing that "the historian is not (...) a psychoanalyst", while adding that "psychoanalytic insights may nevertheless help historians understand the content of the confessions and their elements of psychotic delusion."

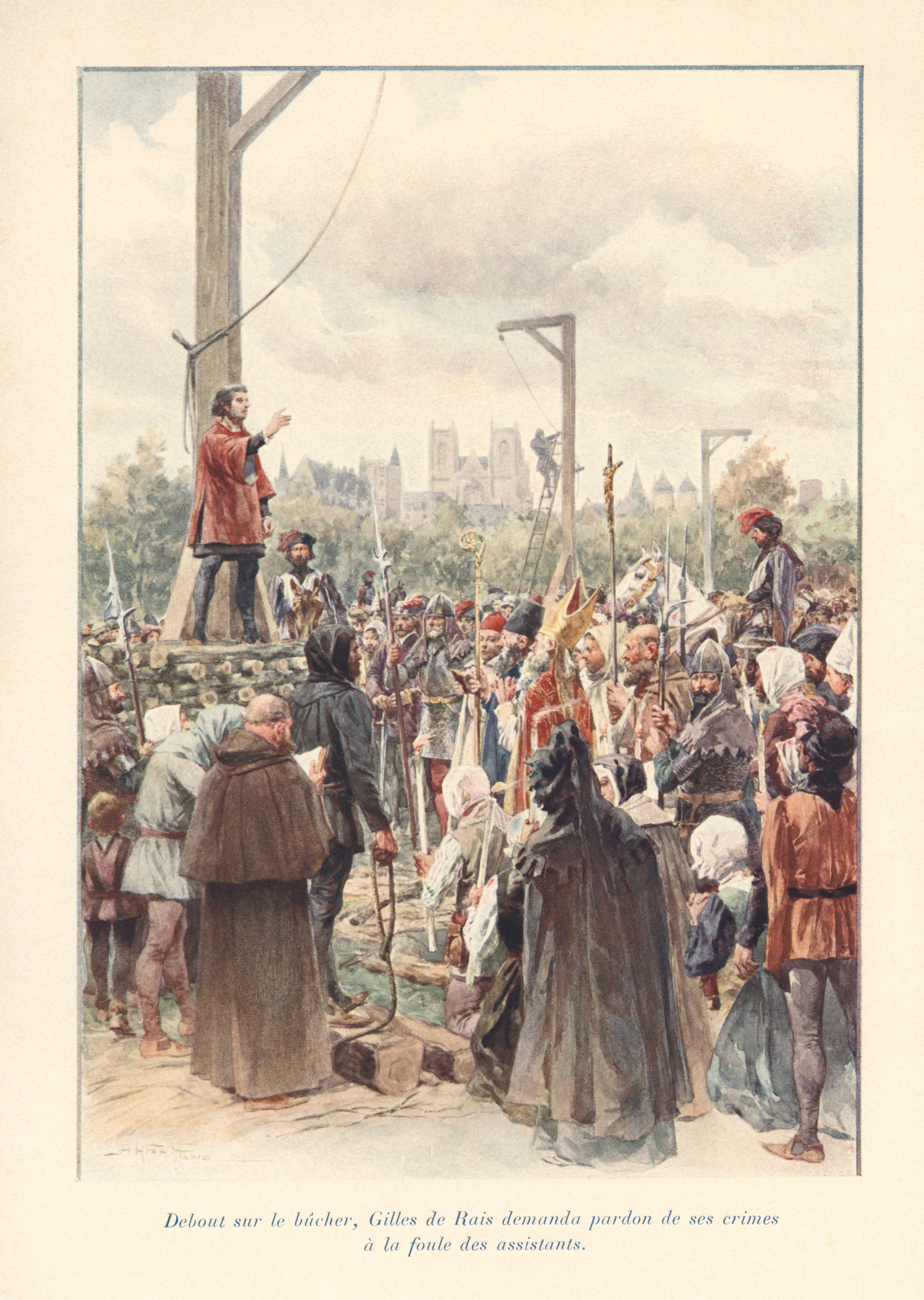
Gilles de Rais at the stake. Color plate after a watercolor by Alfred Paris, 1913

Medievalist Jacques Chiffoleau questions the applicability of modern criminological categories to a fifteenth-century case. He maintains that "the psychology of Gilles de Rais remains forever ... inaccessible to us. Based on the scant evidence available, we can never know whether he would qualify as a serial killer". He argues that "the notion of an almost timeless perverse structure" bears only a distant relationship to "the medieval threefold accusation of rebellion, a pact with the Devil, and unnatural relations." Thus, while Gilles de Rais's confessions may appear to "reflect the combination of psychosis and narcissistic perversion characteristic of contemporary serial killers", they are, for Chiffoleau, more illuminating of "the mechanisms of 15th-century political justice and institutional frameworks" than of pedophilia and serial murder in the Late Middle Ages.

Essayist Michel Meurger likewise questions the assumption that "the crimes of modern offenders can shed light on this pre-modern case". Sociologist and criminologist Aurélien Dyjak cautions against applying the modern category of the "serial killer" to historical perpetrators of multiple murders. In his view, such an approach risks obscuring the specific contexts, motivations, and trajectories that shaped these crimes while creating the illusion of a historically continuous phenomenon, turning the serial killer into "a kind of criminological catch-all". Since the category itself is partly a product of twentieth-century social and historical developments, its retrospective application projects modern assumptions onto the past at the expense of historical specificity: "by designating Gilles de Rais as a serial killer, we are likely rewriting his history and reinforcing the notion that his crimes were a timeless manifestation of a universal human behavior".

Historian Anne-Claude Ambroise-Rendu traces contemporary media representations of child sex offenders to the convergence of two discourses that emerged in the 1990s and 2000s. One of them, which came to dominate public debate in the wake of the Dutroux, Outreau, and Angers cases, centred on child rapist-murderers and pedophile networks; the other focused on the prevalence of sexual violence committed within family, educational, and religious settings. The intersection of these two strands gave rise to the archetype of the "pedophile conflated with the rapist-murderer", a dangerous repeat offender depicted as "a modern-day Gilles de Rais, embodying both the predator and the disturbed individual." Jacques Chiffoleau, meanwhile, emphasizes the historical shift in perceptions of Gilles de Rais: now interpreted through the lens of pedophilia, he is seen as endangering individuals by threatening their children, whereas in the fifteenth century his crimes were understood as a threat to collective and political sovereignty.

== Gilles de Rais and the Bluebeard myth ==
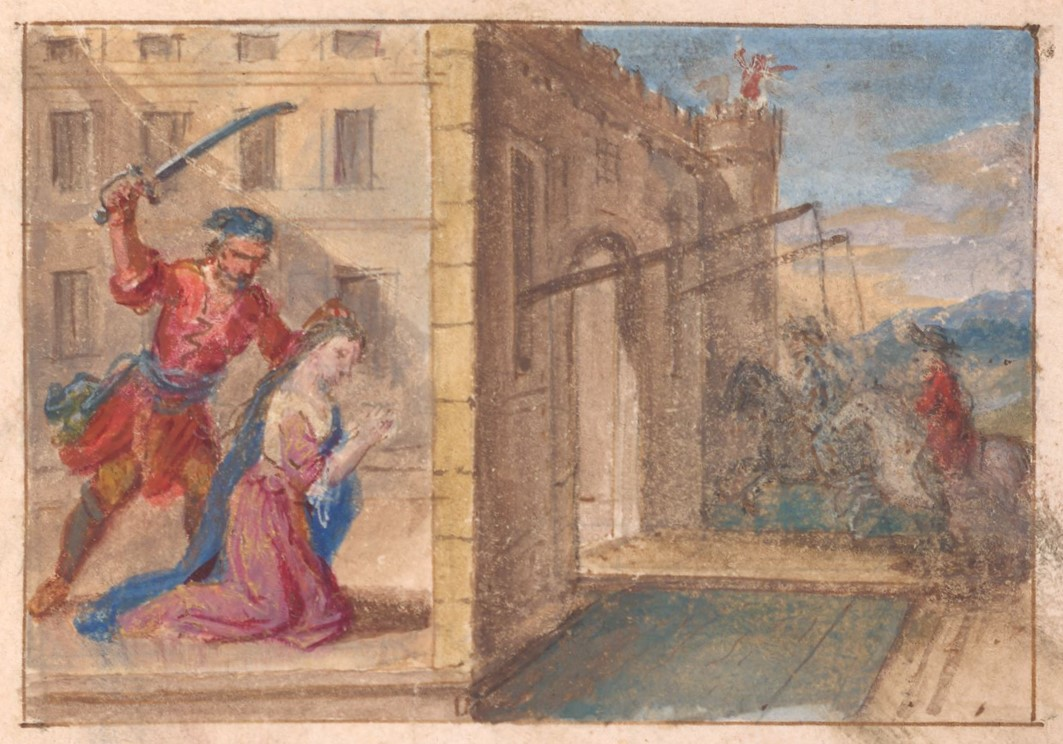
Bluebeard is about to slit the throat of his wife. Gouache adorning a manuscript of Charles Perrault's Mother Goose Tales, 1695

Gilles de Rais's story may have been one of the influences on Charles Perrault's "Bluebeard" literary fairy tale, included in Stories or Tales from Past Times, with Morals (1697), but this hypothesis is disputed as being too fragile.

In any case, long after the publication of Mother Goose Tales, Bluebeard's mythical character is frequently amalgamated with Gilles de Rais's historical legend from the 19th century onwards. Travel reports, local oral literature and tourist activities all point to a popular confusion between Gilles de Rais and the fictitious wife-murderer, despite the profound differences between the two figures.

According to Matei Cazacu, collective memory has gradually shifted in this direction, due to the difficulty of transmitting the memory of child sexual abuse. Bluebeard is at times entwined with the memory of castle ruins scattered across western France—often the erstwhile estates of Gilles de Rais—which, as Matei Cazacu suggests, "have, by their very presence, helped anchor these tales in a tangible setting, a true memory space."

== Relationship with Joan of Arc ==
The duality between Joan of Arc and Gilles de Rais is a recurring theme in fiction, yet 15th-century sources do not suggest that they shared an exceptionally close relationship. Medieval scholars generally identify Gilles de Rais as one of the compagnons ("comrades-in-arms") of the Maid of Orléans, without portraying him as either a close associate or a committed supporter of her mission.

Joan of Arc's own perception of Gilles de Rais remains beyond the reach of the historical record. Likewise, the later image of Gilles de Rais withdrawing to his western lands after her execution at Rouen, grieving her memory and eventually descending into depression and homicidal madness because of her death, finds no support in contemporary sources.

Several instances have been retrospectively interpreted as signs of his continued attachment to Joan of Arc's memory, but the basis for such an interpretation remains speculative. Among them is his presence at Louviers on 26 December 1430. A receipt issued on that day records his reimbursement of his squire Roland Mauvoisin, captain of Prinçay, for 260 écus spent on the purchase of a black horse with saddle and bridle. The horse was intended for another of his squires, Michel Machefer, a captain of men-at-arms and archers in his company, who had been promised a suitable mount for the expedition upon their arrival at Louviers. Because of the town's proximity to Rouen, where Joan of Arc was imprisoned, some historians have interpreted this expedition as a possible attempt to rescue the Maid, although this hypothesis cannot be confirmed with certainty.

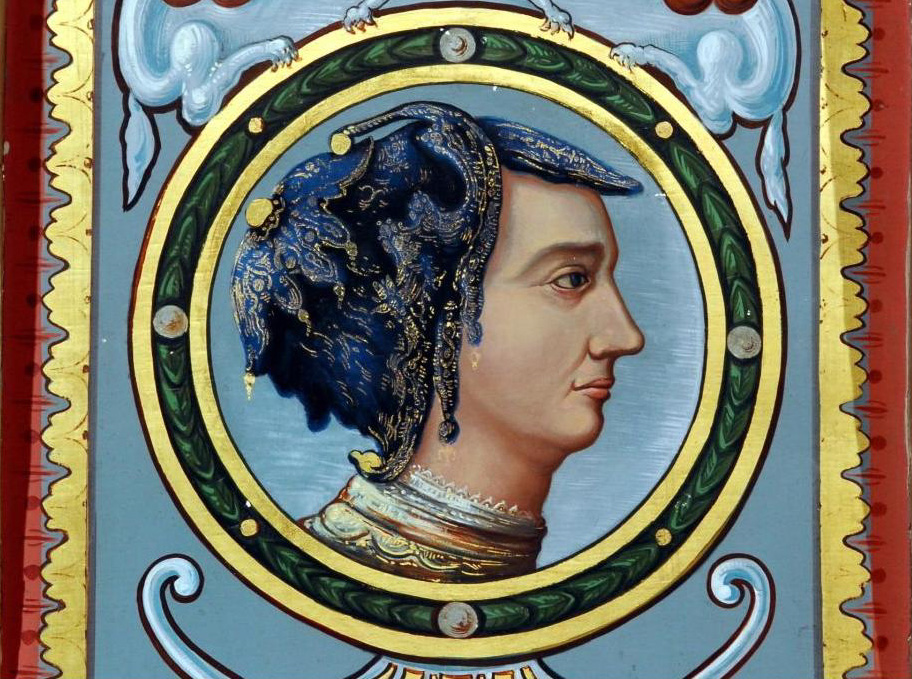
19th-century artist's impression of Jeanne des Armoises

Another case concerns the city of Orléans, which in 1439 acquired one of his banners for a theatrical commemoration of the lifting of the English siege. This acquisition does not, however, demonstrate that he personally supported the Mystery of the Siege of Orléans, a probably unperformed mystery play celebrating Joan of Arc.

That same year, Gilles de Rais appointed the Gascon squire Jean de Siquenville to command a company of men-at-arms during an expedition against the English-held town of Le Mans. This company had previously served under Jeanne des Armoises, who claimed to be Joan of Arc. According to medieval historian Jacques Chiffoleau, however, the nature of her relationship with Gilles de Rais remains "poorly documented and difficult to interpret."

== See also ==
- Cultural depictions of Gilles de Rais
- François Prelati
