= Château de Cherbourg =

Former French castle

Coordinates: 49.640682°N 1.624176°W

Château de Cherbourg (French pronunciation: [ʃato də ʃɛʁbuʁ]) was a castle in Cherbourg, Normandy, France.

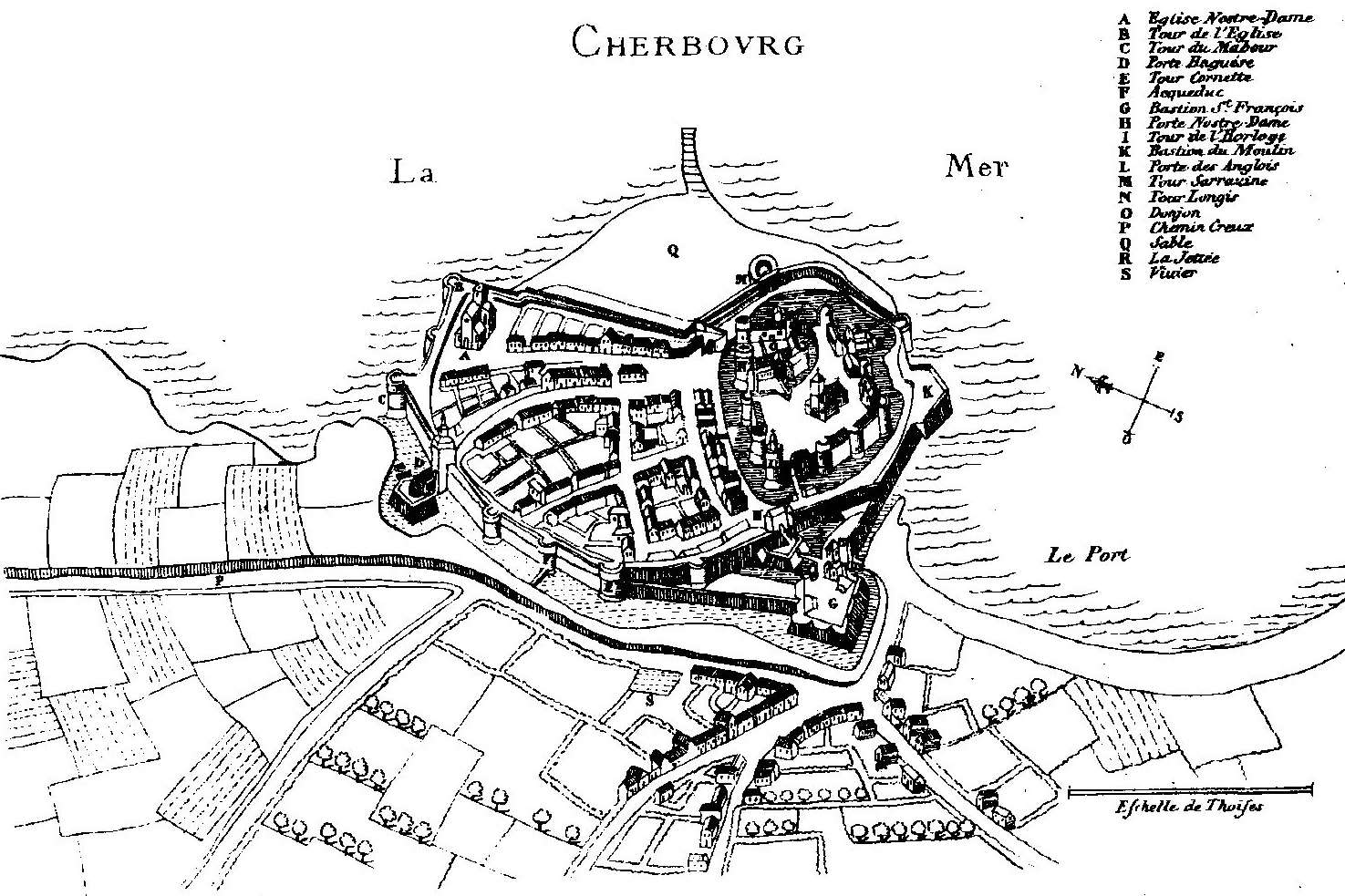
Map of Cherbourg, including castle in the 15th century.

A castle has existed at Cherbourg since the 10th century. In the 1360s the castle's citadel was renovated by Charles the Bad, King of Navarre.

In 1418 a combined English army and fleet besieged Cherbourg and starved it into submission after six months.

The castle was recaptured by the French in 1450. The English defence was led by the Yorkshire squire Thomas Gower, while French forces included Arthur de Richemont, the Count of Clermont, Gaspard Bureau, and Prigent de Coëtivy, the latter of whom was killed by English artillery. After a month-long siege Gower negotiated a surrender agreement with Richemont and Jacques Coeur. In return for a cash payment for himself and the garrison, release of prisoners, and safe passage to England and the sale of their lands in France, Gower surrendered the fortress on 12 August 1450. In total the transaction cost the French treasury 40,000 écus.

The fall of Cherbourg was a significant stage in the Hundred Years' War as it had been the last English toehold in Normandy following a three-decade long occupation: as John Paston's land agent complained: "we have not now a foote of londe in Normandie".
