= François Prelati =

Italian cleric and alchemist

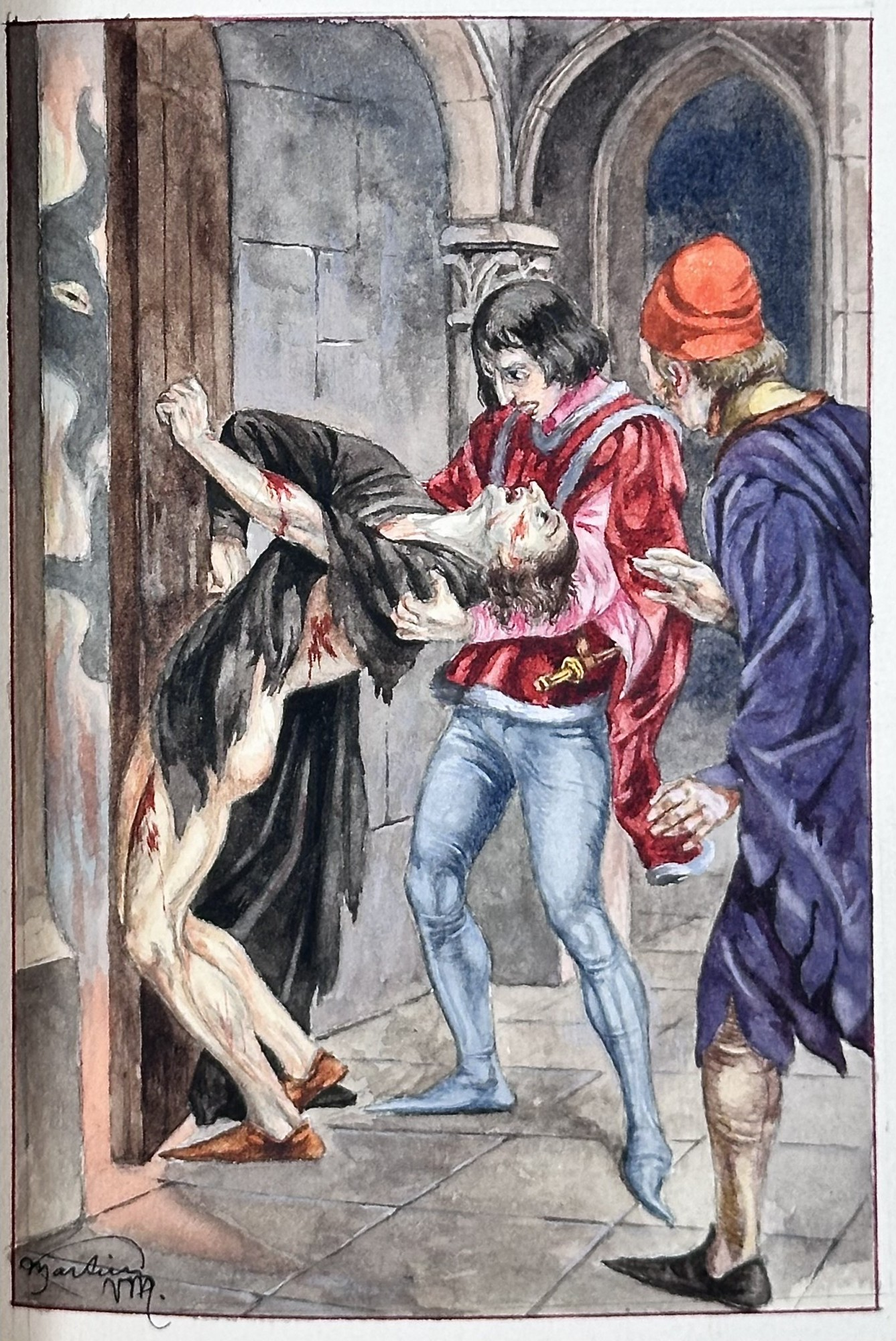
- Allegedly beaten by the devil, François Prelati collapses, covered in blood, into the arms of Gilles de Rais, under the gaze of the priest Eustache Blanchet. Watercolor by Martin van Maële for the novel Là-bas by Joris-Karl Huysmans, 1891.
- Born: Francesco Prelati c. 1417; Montecatini Terme
- Died: March or April 1446; Chinon
- Occupations: Cleric, Alchemist
François Prelati
- Status: Executed
- Penalty: Execution by burning

François Prelati (c. 1417 - March or April 1446) was an Italian cleric and alchemist in the service of Gilles de Rais. He claimed to be able to summon a demon named Barron.

He is thought by some to have been a possible sexual partner of Gilles but "in absence of evidence", this is only a speculation initially stated by Georges Bataille.

== Life ==
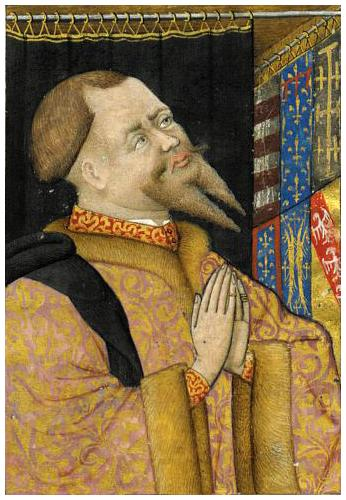
René of Anjou in prayer, book of hours' illuminated manuscript, c. 1437, BnF

Sentenced to life imprisonment following the trial of Gilles de Rais, François Prelati probably managed to escape, and then found refuge outside the jurisdiction of the Duchy of Brittany, more precisely at the court of Duke René of Anjou. This prince, son of Yolande of Aragon, had become the titular king of Sicily and the new head of the House of Valois-Anjou following the death of his elder brother Louis III of Anjou. Through the intermediary of a confessor of René of Anjou, the young Italian cleric obtained an audience with this Angevin prince, whose sumptuous and refined court welcomed many artists and poets.

Prelati was able to show off his alleged alchemical talents, probably thanks to conjuring tricks that enabled him to brandish an ingot of silver concealed in the crucible of the "magnum opus" at just the right moment, so much so that the swindler was appointed captain of La Roche-sur-Yon castle by René of Anjou. Adopting the identity of François de Montcatin (after the name of his native town), the Tuscan adventurer used his new position to seek revenge on Geoffroy Le Ferron (now Treasurer of France) because of the legal troubles following Gilles de Rais' act of force in Saint-Étienne-de-Mer-Morte. (Note: From 1439 to 1441, Geoffroy Le Ferron was Treasurer and Receiver General of John V, Duke of Brittany, "after having helped him mightily to strip Gilles de Retz", states medievalist Jean Kerhervé. Le Ferron thus acquired Saint-Étienne-de-Mer-Morte, which Gilles de Rais then attempted to reclaim by force by committing the sacrilege of mid-May 1440. In 1443, Le Ferron was pursuing his career at the royal court as Treasurer of France and advisor to King Charles VII of France.)

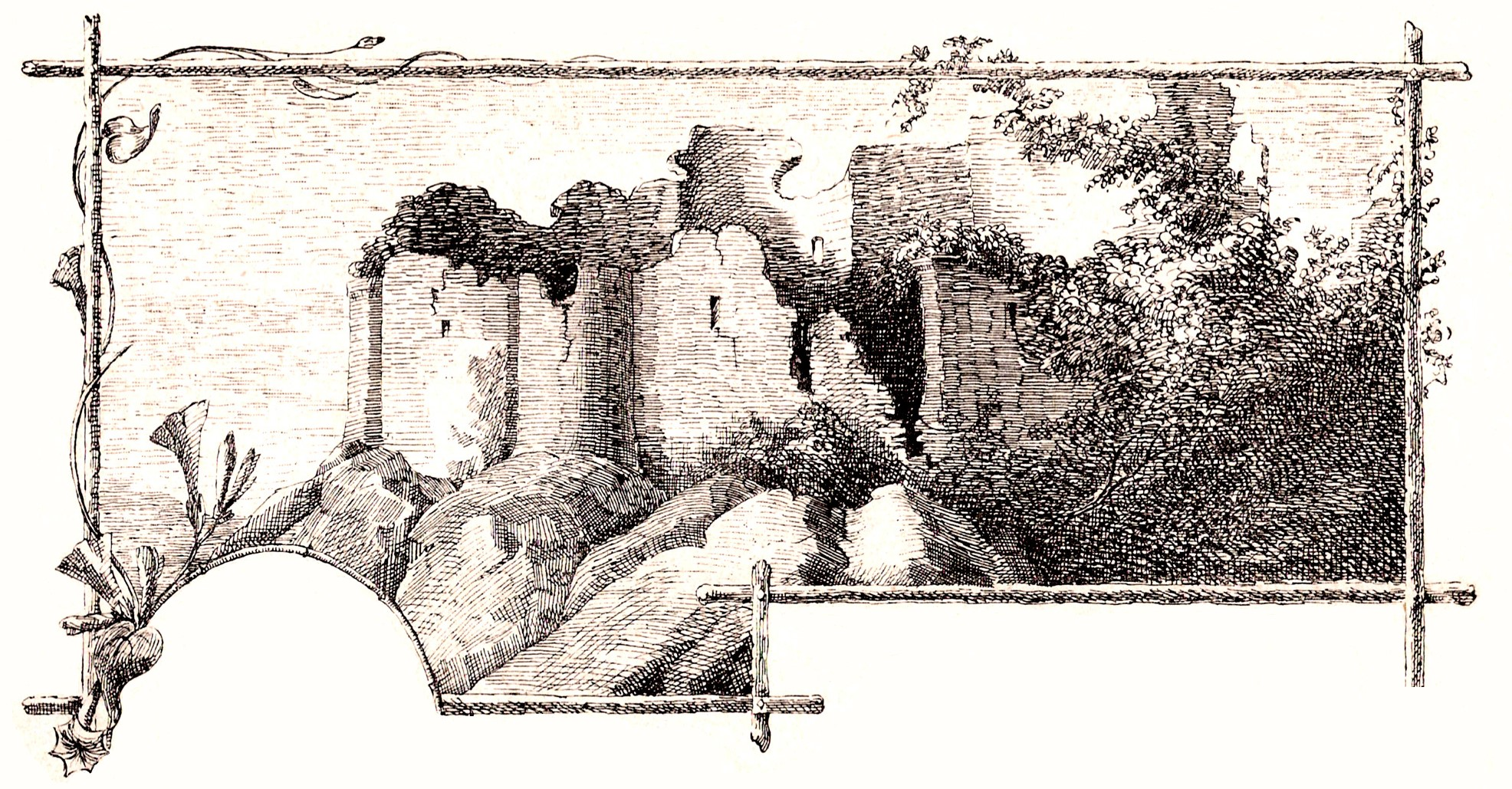
Ruins of La Roche-sur-Yon castle, from a 19th-century sketch

On his way to Taillebourg to visit Prigent VII de Coëtivy (Admiral of France and husband of Gilles de Rais' only daughter), (Note: In 1441, Admiral Prigent de Coëtivy married Marie, Rais' daughter. Now the new Baron de Retz, Coëtivy supported several lawsuits to claim his wife's inheritance, in other words, the lands that had belonged to his late father-in-law.) Geoffroy Le Ferron passed through La Roche-sur-Yon on 7 December 1444. Invited to the castle by the captain-alchemist, he was insulted by the priest Eustache Blanchet, before being arbitrarily imprisoned by order of Prelati, who blamed him for his own imprisonment in Nantes during the trial of Gilles de Rais. In order to extort an enormous ransom from the treasurer, Rais' two former servants subjected him to two and a half months of harsh treatment. Among other moral and physical tortures, Prelati and Blanchet try to frighten Le Ferron by pretending to discover among his papers a dummy letter that compromises him in an imaginary betrayal by Prigent de Coëtivy.

Informed of the situation, René of Anjou's officers demanded that Prelati bring Le Ferron before the ducal council. The captain pretended to comply, before returning the French treasurer to his dungeon. Twelve days later, knight Guy d'Aussigny, lord of Trèves and lieutenant to the king "in the countries of Poitou, Saintonge, the government of La Rochelle and Angoumois", appeared with a company of fifty men-of-war in front of La Roche-sur-Yon's fortress. Refusing to deliver Geoffroy Le Ferron, Prelati opposed the surrender of the fortress and marched out with his own troops, provoking a skirmish that resulted in the death of one of Guy d'Aussigny's soldiers.

Shortly afterwards, two of René of Anjou's officers tried again to get Prelati to hand over Geoffroy Le Ferron. The Italian captain finally agreed, after paying the French treasurer's ransom. The latter was transferred to Angers, where he unsuccessfully lodged a complaint with the Chamber of Audit of Anjou. Le Ferron managed to be escorted to King René d'Anjou in Nancy, but remained in custody there for some time, where King Charles VII of France was staying at the time. When the French King heard of the affair, the matter was referred to the Parlement of Paris, which finally issued a ruling condemning Prelati and his main accomplice, squire Jacques Chabot, to death. Towards the end of March 1446, or at the beginning of the following month, Prelati was burned at the stake to atone for his crimes.

Referred to the Parlement of Paris along with several other Prelati's accomplices, Eustache Blanchet was in constant default from January 1448 to March 1451. On 18 May 1453, the Parliament handed down its final ruling, condemning the priest and his acolytes to return Geoffroy Le Ferron's property, to make amends to the King and the Treasurer of France, and to pay a fine, perpetual banishment and confiscation of their property.

== In fiction ==
Gilles de Rais with François Prelati (dressed in black and holding a book), Roger de Briqueville and the priest Eustache Blanchet in an alchemy laboratory. Comic series Jhen Roque by Jacques Martin and Jean Pleyers

François Prelati appears as a recurring character in the French comic series Jhen Roque written by Jacques Martin. Comic artist Jean Pleyers depicts him as "an extremely handsome young man with black hair and a black suit, who doesn't mind posing as Saint Sebastian for his painter friends."

Prelati also appeared in Fate/strange fake by Ryōgo Narita. As an influential figure in the story, he is depicted as someone who has died and switched bodies numerous times, having a female body during the time the series takes place.

== Bibliography ==
- Bataille, Georges (1959), Procès de Gilles de Rais. Documents précédés d'une introduction de Georges Bataille (in French), Paris: Club français du livre.
  - Bataille, Georges (1990), The Trial of Gilles de Rais, Los Angeles: Amok Books, ISBN 978-1-878923-02-8.
- Boudet, Jean-Patrice (2006), Entre science et nigromance: astrologie, divination et magie dans l'Occident médiéval (XIIe-XVe siècle), Histoire ancienne et médiévale (in French), Paris: Publications de la Sorbonne, ISBN 978-2-85944-544-7.
- Cazacu, Matei (2005), Gilles de Rais (in French), Paris: Tallandier, ISBN 2-84734-227-3.
  - Cazacu, Matei (2008), Barbablù: La vera storia di Gilles de Rais (in Italian), Mondadori, ISBN 978-88-04-58181-9.
- Fauré, Benjamin (2022). "René d'Anjou, son entourage et l'alchimie: des ateliers de faussaires au creuset littéraire". Cahiers de recherches médiévales et humanistes (in French) (43). Paris: Classiques Garnier: 511–559. doi:10.48611/isbn.978-2-406-13326-1.p.0511. ISBN 978-2-406-13326-1. ISSN 2273-0893.
- Guérin, Paul; Celier, Léonce, eds. (1898), Recueil des documents concernant le Poitou contenus dans les registres de la chancellerie de France (in French), vol. 8, Poitiers: Société des archives historiques du Poitou.
- Meurger, Michel (2003), Gilles de Rais et la littérature, Terres fantastiques (in French), Rennes: Terre de brume, ISBN 2-84362-149-6.
- Verola, Maria Letizia (2004). "Gilles de Rais e l'alchimia: la fortuna di un tema sanguinario nelle fantasie di un apprendista stregone". In Bruni, Stefano; Caruso, Teresa; Massa, Morella (eds.). Archaeologica pisana: scritti per Orlanda Pancrazzi. Terra Italia (in Italian). Pisa: Giardini Editori e Stampatori in Pisa. pp. 404–415. ISBN 884270301X.
