= Hôtel de Ville, Cherbourg =

Town hall in Cherbourg, France

Hôtel de Ville
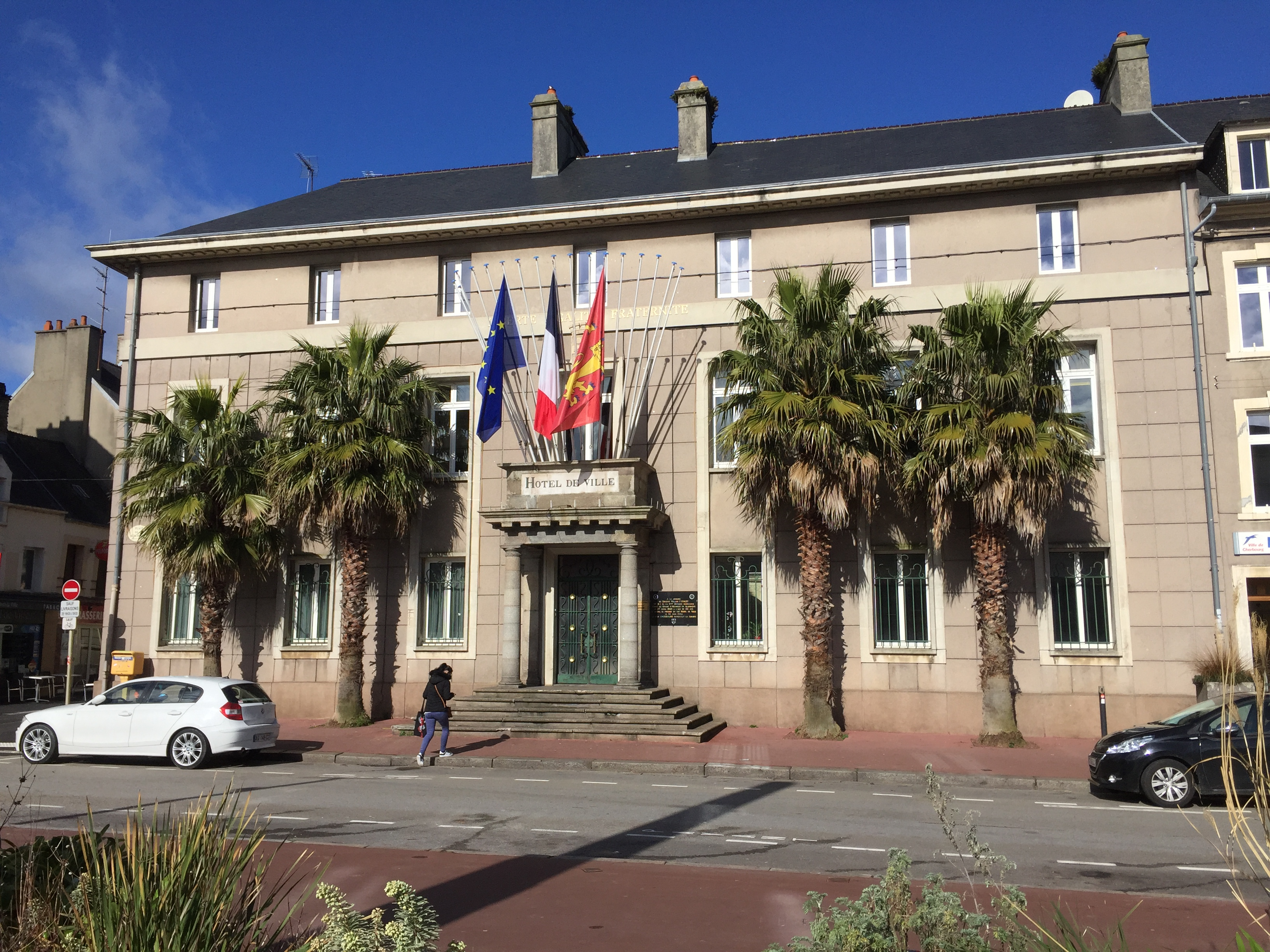
- The main frontage of the Hôtel de Ville in March 2018

General information
- Type: City hall
- Architectural style: Neoclassical style
- Location: Cherbourg, France
- Coordinates: 49.6424°N 1.6255°W
- Completed: 1804

Monument historique
- Official name: Hôtel de ville
- Type: Inscrit
- Designated: 2004
- Reference no.: PA50000028

The Hôtel de Ville (French pronunciation: [otɛl də vil], City Hall) is a municipal building in Cherbourg, Manche, northwest France, standing on Place de la République. Part of the interior of the building was designated a monument historique by the French government in 2004.

== History ==
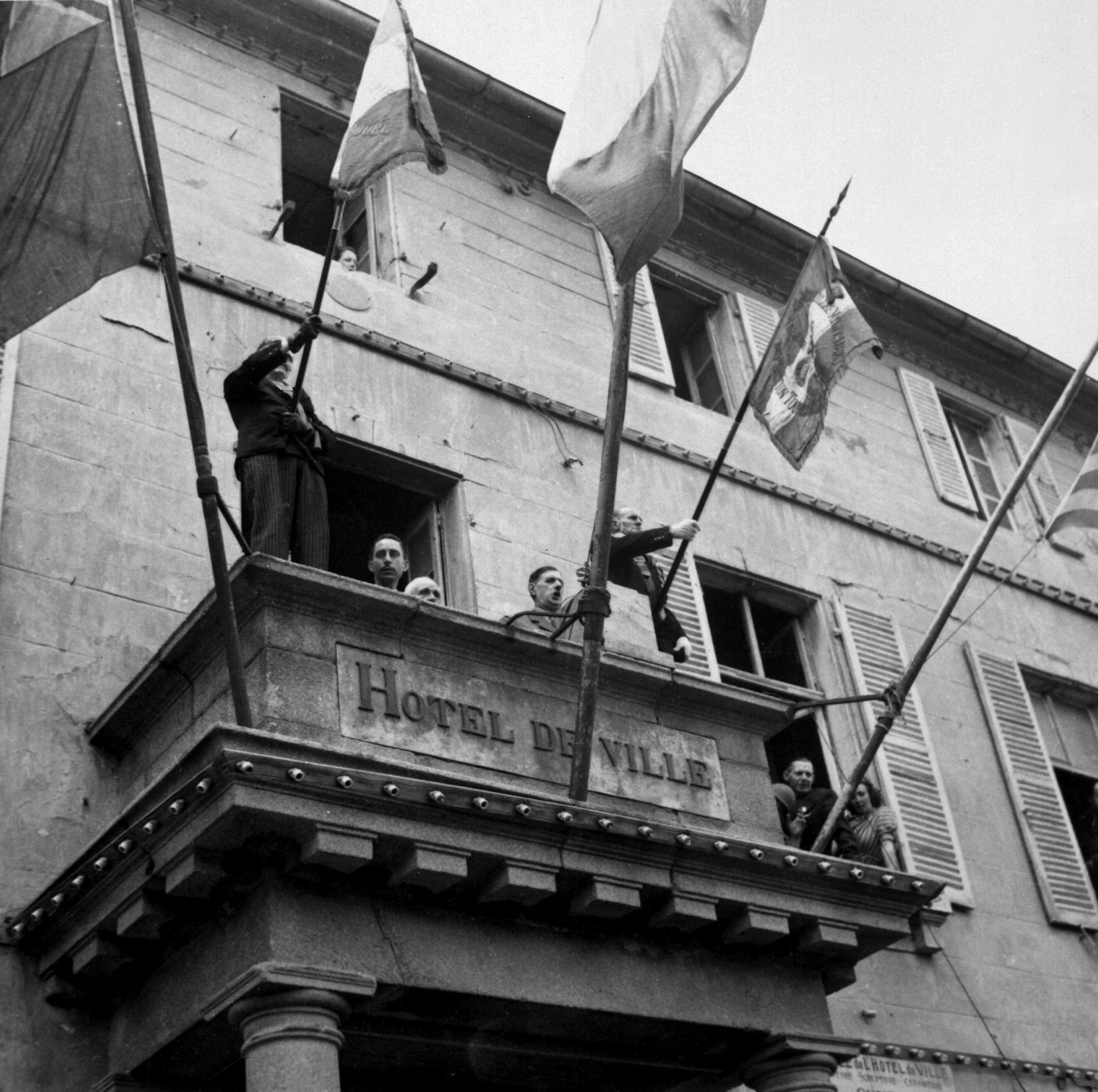
General Charles de Gaulle addressing the crowd from the balcony in August 1944

The aldermen met in the Basilique Sainte-Trinité de Cherbourg (Basilica of the Holy Trinity of Cherbourg), before moving to Château de Cherbourg (Cherbourg Castle) in 1590. After the castle was demolished on orders of François-Michel le Tellier, Marquis de Louvois in 1688, they held their meetings alternately at the basilica, at the Hôtel-Dieu, and at the Auditoire de la Jurisdiction Royale (Auditorium of Royal Jurisdiction) in Place de la Trinité (now Place de la Révolution).

After the French Revolution, the town council decided to commission a town hall. The site they selected was on the west side of Place de la République. The building was designed in a rudimentary style, built in stone and was completed in 1804. The design involved a broadly symmetrical main frontage of seven bays facing onto Place de la République. The central featured a portico formed by a pair of Doric order columns supporting an entablature, a cornice and a balcony: there was a French door on the first floor. There was also another doorway in the left-hand bay. The other bays on the ground floor and on the first floor, and all the bays on the second floor were fenestrated with casement windows with shutters.

A memorial, designed by Joseph Cachin in the form of a 25 ft (7.6 m)-high granite obelisk, was installed in front of the town hall at the instigation of the mayor, Nicolas Collart, in 1817. It was intended to commemorate the return of Charles Ferdinand, Duke of Berry on the British frigate Eurotas to Paris on 13 April 1814.

The building was extended to the southwest along Rue de la Paix in the neoclassical style to a design by Francois Dominique Geufroy in the mid-19th century. By then, the principal rooms included the Salle du Conseil (council chamber), grand salon (ballroom), le salon octogonal (octagonal room) and the salon de l'Impératrice (empress's room). The latter room was created in anticipation of its use by Empress Eugénie when she visited Cherbourg, together with her husband Emperor Napoleon III, on 7 August 1858. The town hall also hosted a grand ball with circa 1,200 guests at the end of the International Naval Festival held at Cherbourg in 1865. A finely carved fireplace, dating from c. 1500, which was recovered from the Abbey of Notre-Dame du Vœu when it was demolished in 1841 and subsequently restored, was installed in the council chamber in 1865.

Following the Normandy landings by allied troops on 6 June 1944, during the Second World War, Sergeant William Finley of the US 9th Infantry Division was the first allied soldier to reach the town hall on 26 June 1944. He died in subsequent fighting and a plaque to commemorate his life was subsequently installed in the town hall. Major-General J. Lawton Collins commanding the American VII Corps presented a French tricolour flag made from parachutes to the mayor, Paul Renault, for use on the town hall flagpole, on 2 July 1944. The chairman of the Provisional Government, General Charles de Gaulle visited the town and gave a speech from the balcony of the town hall on 20 August 1944.

In 1951, a police station in the building was closed, and the main frontage was modified with new concrete cladding and modern casement windows.
