= Siege of Cherbourg =

Siege of Cherbourg may refer to:

- Siege of Cherbourg (1139), the siege and capture of the town by forces loyal to Stephen, King of England
- Siege of Cherbourg (1142), the siege and capture of the town by Geoffrey Plantagenet, Count of Anjou
- Siege of Cherbourg (1378), the unsuccessful siege of the town by the French during the Hundred Years' War
- Siege of Cherbourg (1418), the siege and capture of the town by the English during the Hundred Years' War
- Siege of Cherbourg (1450), the siege and capture of the town by the French during the Hundred Years' War
