= The Case Files of Lord El-Melloi II =

Japanese light novel series and its adaptions

- Type-Moon Books' cover of the first novel

ロード・エルメロイII世の事件簿 (Rōdo Erumeroi Nisei no Jikenbo)
- Genre: Mystery
- Created by: Makoto Sanda; Type-Moon
- Light novel
- Written by: Makoto Sanda
- Illustrated by: Mineji Sakamoto
- Published by: Type-Moon
- Imprint: Type-Moon Books
- Original run: December 30, 2014 – May 17, 2019
- Volumes: 10
- Manga
- Written by: Makoto Sanda
- Illustrated by: Tō Azuma
- Published by: Kadokawa Shoten
- Magazine: Young Ace
- Original run: October 4, 2017 – present
- Volumes: 14
- Anime television series

Lord El-Melloi II's Case Files {Rail Zeppelin} Grace note
- Directed by: Makoto Katō
- Produced by: Naoto Kasahara; Shizuka Kurosaki
- Written by: Ukyō Kodachi
- Music by: Yuki Kajiura
- Studio: Troyca
- Licensed by: NA: Aniplex of America
- Original network: Tokyo MX, BS11, GTV, GYT, MBS, AT-X, ABA
- Original run: July 6, 2019 – September 28, 2019
- Episodes: 13 + 2 SP
- Light novel

The Adventures of Lord El-Melloi II
- Written by: Makoto Sanda
- Illustrated by: Mineji Sakamoto
- Published by: Type-Moon
- Imprint: Type-Moon Books
- Original run: December 25, 2020 – present
- Volumes: 10

The Case Files of Lord El-Melloi II (Japanese: ロード・エルメロイII世の事件簿, Hepburn: Rōdo Erumeroi Nisei no Jikenbo) is a Japanese light novel series written by Makoto Sanda (Rental Magica) and illustrated by Mineji Sakamoto. Officially part of the Fate series, it began serialization by Type-Moon under the Type-Moon Books imprint on December 30, 2014, to May 17, 2019. The novels are set between the events of Fate/Zero and Fate/stay night, focusing on Lord El-Melloi II, a former master who now investigates several mysteries after his participation in the Fourth Holy Grail War. A sequel novel series, The Adventures of Lord El-Melloi II (ロード・エルメロイII世の冒険, Rōdo Erumeroi Nisei no Bōken), began publishing on December 25, 2020.

Two media adaptations were officially made: a manga adaptation by Makoto Sanda with illustrations from Tō Azuma began serialization in Kadokawa Shoten's Young Ace magazine on October 4, 2017, and an anime adaptation by Troyca, which adapts the Rail Zeppelin chapter, aired from July 6 to September 28, 2019. On December 31, 2018, and December 31, 2021, the anime adaptation broadcast special edition episodes.

== Story ==
Taking place 10 years after the events of Fourth Holy Grail War and 2 months before the events of Fate/stay night, the story focuses on Lord El-Melloi II, formerly known as Waver Velvet, a successor of Kayneth and former master in the last Grail War, who is now a professor under the ranks of the Mage's Association. In his years as a professor in the Clock Tower, he is acting as the temporary head of the El-Melloi household until a proper successor can take over. When strange mysteries involving magic start occurring throughout London, he teams up with his apprentice, Gray, to solve these magical cases and expose the hidden conspiracies that drive the Mage's Association.

== Characters ==
=== Main characters ===
Waver Velvet (ウェイバー・ベルベット, Weibā Berubetto) / Lord El-Melloi II (ロード・エルメロイII世, Rōdo Erumeroi Nisei)
Voiced by: Daisuke Namikawa (Japanese); Lucien Dodge (English)
Played by: Yuya Matsushita
The protagonist of the series. He was first introduced as a side character and participant in the Fourth Holy Grail War of Fate/Zero as the Master of Rider, Iskandar. After the events of Fate/Zero, he returned to the Clock Tower to resume his study of magecraft. The previous Lord El-Melloi had been killed during the events of Fate/Zero which resulted in a sharp decline of the El-Melloi clan. Waver assumes the title of Lord El-Melloi II after agreeing to assist the true heir, Reines El-Melloi Archisorte, in restoring the clan until she is old enough to take charge. In Fate/Grand Order, Zhuge Liang's spirit origin possess him and becomes a Caster-class pseudo-servant.
Gray (グレイ, Gurei)
Voiced by: Reina Ueda (Japanese); Kayli Mills (English)
Played by: Saho Aono
An apprentice of Lord El-Melloi II, she is a girl who lived in the countryside of Britain before moving to the city. Originally a normal villager, she is revealed to have been altered since birth as a vessel for the second coming of Artoria Pendragon, the Saber-class servant of the Fourth and Fifth Holy Grail War to wield the Holy Spear Rhongomyniad. Born as a result of her village's attempts, her wielding the spear results in her appearance to slowly starting to transform into that of Artoria's. After El-Melloi II realizes who she is, he requests that Gray keeps her face hidden under her hood. In Fate/Grand Order, due to her growing image as Artoria's avatar, she is identified as an Assassin-class demi-servant, similar to Mash Kyrielight.

- Add (アッド, Addo)

Voiced by: Daisuke Ono (Japanese); Greg Chun (English)
Gray's Mystic Code, an alternate form of the Holy Spear Rhongomyniad taking the form a cube-like entity to preserve the spear's mystery. Extremely talkative and can transform into a scythe for Gray to wield as a weapon, though it can also change to other forms of weapons such as a bow or shield depending on the situation. His personality is implied to be based on Sir Kay, Artoria's brother. In Fate/Grand Order, due to Gray's identification as a demi-servant, Add is classified as her Noble Phantasm.

Reines El-Melloi Archisorte (ライネス・エルメロイ・アーチゾルテ, Rainesu Erumeroi Āchizorute)
Voiced by: Inori Minase (Japanese); Allegra Clark (English)
Played by: Kaho Amasaki
Kayneth El-Melloi Archibald's niece and the bloodline successor of the El-Melloi Household. As a result of her age and inexperience she requests that Waver Velvet, Lord El-Melloi II, lead the household until she is ready. She treats him as though he is her older brother. She is equipped with a powerful Mystic Eyes ability and was always seen with Trimmau, her Mystic Code which also serves as her maid. In Fate/Grand Order, Sima Yi's spirit origin possess her and becomes a Rider-class pseudo-servant. However, unlike most pseudo-servants where the servants and the host become fused, Reines retains her personality intact split with Sima's like a split personality disorder, sharing the same body.

=== El-Melloi classroom ===
Flat Escardos (フラット・エルカルドス, Furatto Erukarudosu)
Voiced by: Yoshitsugu Matsuoka (Japanese); Khoi Dao (English)
Played by: Takeru Naya
One of the students of Lord El-Melloi II in the Modern Magecraft class. He smart yet also dimwitted at the same time. He first appeared as one of the main protagonists of Fate/strange fake as the master of False Berserker.
Svin Glascheit (スヴィン・グラシュエート, Suvuin Gurashuēto)
Voiced by: Seiichiro Yamashita (Japanese); David Errigo Jr. (English)
Played by: Ryūjirō Izaki
One of the Lord El-Melloi II's prominent students in the Modern Magecraft class. He is nicknamed "le chien" ('the dog' in French) by Flat due to his Beast Magecraft skills which gives him wolf-like sense of smell and speed. Has a deep crush on Gray, becoming enamored with her the moment he first caught her scent; much to her nervousness.
Caules Forvedge (カウレス・フォルヴェッジ, Kauresu Foruvuejji)
Voiced by: Yūsuke Kobayashi (Japanese); Tom Bauer (English)
Also a student of Lord El-Melloi II and the oldest heir of the Forvedge family. He enrolled to the Mages' Association when his sister Fiore stepped down as the heir of the family. He first appeared in an alternate timeline as one of the protagonists in Fate/Apocrypha as the master of Berserker of Black under the Yggdmillennia clan.
Yvette L. Lehrman (イヴェット・L・レーマン, Ivetto L. Rēman)
Voiced by: Miho Okasaki (Japanese); Sarah Anne Williams (English)
A student from the El-Melloi Classroom debuting from the Rail Zeppelin arc and involved in the Mystic Eyes Collection Train incident. Her family specializes in gems to create Mystic Eyes. She harbors deep romantic feelings for Lord El-Melloi II and desires to become his mistress, much to his discomfort.
Luviagelita Edelfelt (ルヴィアゼリッタ・エーデルフェルト, Ruviazeritta Ēderuferuto)
Voiced by: Shizuka Itō (Japanese); Lauren Landa (English)
A student from the El-Melloi Classroom who is the descendant of the Edelfelt family, who participated in the Third Holy Grail War with twin Masters, believing it would be advantageous for them to have two Servants due to their Crest being split in half, though the family has not participated since. Luvia is an outstanding but arrogant student at the Mage's Association and frequently fights with other students, including Rin Tōsaka, her cousin. She is notably famous in the non-magical world due to her job as a professional wrestler, where she is known as the "Forklift Lady" due to her immense strength. Her powers are similar to Rin's.

=== Mage Association/The Clock Tower ===
Melvin Weins (メルヴィン・ウェインズ, Meruvin Wueinzu)
Voiced by: Daisuke Hirakawa (Japanese); Christian La Monte (English)
An old friend of Lord El-Melloi II and a member of the Mages' Association from the Creation Department, who is responsible for Waver's participation in the Fourth Holy Grail War in Fuyuki, Japan. He is also a legendary Tuner for Magic Crests and carries a violin to tune them. He is the only one who calls Waver by his original name and not by his title.
Kairi Shishigou (獅子劫界離, Shishigō Kairi)
Voiced by: Kenji Nomura (Japanese); Patrick Seitz (English)
An freelance necromancer and Mercenary from Japan who partake jobs from the Clock Tower. He first appeared in an alternate timeline as one of the protagonists in Fate/Apocrypha as the master of Saber of Red under the Red Faction.
Hishiri Adashino (化野 菱理, Adashino Hishiri)
Voiced by: Yūko Minaguchi (Japanese); Julia McIlvaine (English)
Played by: Kazuho Sō
An officer from the Policies Department of the Clock Tower debuting from the Adra Castle Separation arc.
Olga Marie Animusphere (オルガマリー・アースミレイト・アニムスフィア, Orugamarī Āsumireito Animusufia)
Voiced by: Megumi Toyoguchi (Drama CD), Madoka Yonezawa (Anime) (Japanese); Kira Buckland (English)
A very high ranking mage from the Animusphere family and the future director of the Chaldea Security Organization debuting from the Rail Zeppelin arc.
Doctor Heartless (ドクター・ハートレス, Dokutā Hātoresu)
Voiced by: Jun Fukuyama (Japanese); Kevin M. Connolly (English)
The main antagonist debuting from the Rail Zeppelin arc. He was the previous head of the Modern Magecraft Theory Department and was responsible for the murders of mages who had their heads stolen along with their Mystic Eyes seven years prior to the start of the series. He is named "Heartless" due to his heart being stolen by fairies. After he summoned Hephaestion, he ranked her as a Faker-class Servant, which he created.

=== Servants ===
Faker (フェイカー, Feikā) / Pretender (プリテンダー, Puritendā) – Hephaestion (ヘファイスティオン, Hefaisution)
Voiced by: Yō Taichi (Japanese); Morgan Berry (English)
A mysterious servant belonging to Doctor Heartless. Although summoned as Hephaestion, she is actually its twin sister; "Iskandar's Shadow". She was summoned by Heartless using the stolen piece of Iskandar's cape and harbors deep hatred to Waver concerning his relation to his previous servant. Though Doctor Heartless summoned and invented a new class which puts her in the "Faker Class", in Fate/Grand Order however, she is recorded as a Pretender-class servant in Chaldea.

== Media ==
=== Light novels ===
The Case Files of Lord El-Melloi II was written by Makoto Sanda, considered to be his first work after being approached by Type-Moon. During a session of tabletop RPG game Red Dragon, alongside Nasu and Gen Urobuchi, Nasu asked Makoto if he could actually write a story for the Fate series. It was then on TYPE-MOON FEST in July 2012 that Nasu asked Makoto to write a story for Waver Velvet/Lord El-Melloi II, on which he agreed. The first novel was first published by Type-Moon under their Type-Moon Books label on Comiket 87 on December 30, 2014. The tenth and last was published on May 17, 2019. It was illustrated by Mineji Sakamoto. Kadokawa Shoten later released the novels in a paperback edition.

No.	Title	Release date	ISBN
1	case.剥離城アドラ	December 28, 2014	978-4-04-108074-0
2	case.双貌塔イゼルマ（上）	August 14, 2015	978-4-04-108075-7
3	case.双貌塔イゼルマ（下）	December 29, 2015	978-4-04-108076-4
4	case.魔眼蒐集列車（レール・ツェッペリン）（上）	August 12, 2016	978-4-04-108077-1
5	case.魔眼蒐集列車（下）	December 31, 2016	978-4-04-108078-8
6	case.アトラスの契約（上）	August 13, 2017	978-4-04-108812-8
7	case.アトラスの契約（下）	December 31, 2017	978-4-04108813-5
8	case.冠位決議（グランド・ロール）（上）	August 12, 2018	978-4-04-109960-5
9	case.冠位決議（中）	December 31, 2018	978-4-04-109962-9
10	case.冠位決議（下）	May 17, 2019	978-4-04-109963-6

A sequel novel series titled The Adventures of Lord El-Melloi II (ロード・エルメロイII世の冒険, Rōdo Erumeroi Nisei no Bōken) was announced in December 2019. The first volume was released on December 25, 2020.

=== Manga ===
A manga adaptation by Makoto Sanda with illustrations from Tō Azuma began serialization in Kadokawa Shoten's Young Ace magazine on October 4, 2017. As of April 2026, fourteen volumes have been released.

No.	Release date	ISBN
1	July 3, 2018	978-4-04-107053-6
2	August 4, 2018	978-4-04-107054-3
3	January 10, 2019	978-4-04-107733-7
4	June 24, 2019	978-4-04-108126-6
5	December 28, 2019	978-4-04-108131-0
6	October 24, 2020	978-4-04-108132-7
7	March 4, 2021	978-4-04-111095-9
8	October 4, 2021	978-4-04-111702-6
9	May 2, 2022	978-4-04-111703-3
10	March 3, 2023	978-4-04-113413-9
11	November 4, 2023	978-4-04-114239-4
12	October 4, 2024	978-4-04-115273-7
13	July 26, 2025	978-4-04-116303-0
14	April 10, 2026	978-4-04-117362-6
15	January 4, 2027	978-4-04-118048-8

=== Anime ===
An anime adaptation of the novels, which only adapts the Rail Zeppelin storyline under the title Lord El-Melloi II's Case Files {Rail Zeppelin} Grace note (ロード・エルメロイII世の事件簿 -魔眼蒐集列車 Grace note-, Rōdo Erumeroi Nisei no Jikenbo {Reru Zeperin} Gureisu Nōto) was announced at the Fate Project New Year's TV special on December 31, 2018, which also aired a special episode of the series. The series is animated by Troyca. Makoto Katō directs the series with Ukyō Kodachi as its writer, while Yuki Kajiura composes the music for the series. Jun Nakai is the character designer, while Ei Aoki is credited as supervisor. It aired from July 6 to September 28, 2019, on Tokyo MX, BS11, GTV, GYT, and MBS. Kajiura composed the series' opening theme song "starting the case: Rail Zeppelin", while ASCA performs the series' ending theme song "Hibari" (雲雀; "Skylark"), with lyrics written by Kajiura. Aniplex of America and Crunchyroll streamed the series in North America, Central America, South America, the United Kingdom, Ireland, Australia, and New Zealand. AnimeLab streamed the series in Australia and New Zealand. Funimation also simulcasted the series in their streaming site in North America. On October 3, 2020, which is Waver's birthday, Aniplex of America announced they will be releasing the series in a Blu-ray box set with a full English dub. The set was released on December 15, 2020.

During Aniplex Online Fest 2021, it was announced that the series will receive a special edition episode. It aired on December 31, 2021. ASCA performed the theme song "Kimi ga Mita Yume no Monogatari" (君が見た夢の物語; "The Story of the Dream You Dreamed").

No.	Title	Original air date
0	"A Grave Keeper, a Cat, and a Mage ~There is no such thing as "truth".~" Transliteration: "Hakamori to neko to majutsu-shi" (Japanese: 墓守と猫と魔術師)	December 31, 2018
Ten years after the events of the Fourth Holy Grail War, Waver Velvet has replaced the deceased Kayneth El-Melloi Archibald as Lord El-Melloi II and is attempting to rebuild the Modern Magecraft Theory department, which has declined in Kayneth's absence. However, he is only the acting Lord until Kayneth's younger niece, Reines El-Melloi Archisorte, comes of age to take his place and must constantly deal with the Clock Tower's internal politics. One day, Waver's apprentice, Gray, adopts a stray cat, much to his frustration. However, the cat is run over by a car and Waver is unable to find a way to save it. As they bury the cat, Gray hears its cry, in which Waver takes notice that his shadow has transformed into a shadow of a cat and realizes that the cat was sacrificed to put a lethal curse on him. Waver recruits two of his students, Flat Escardos and Svin Glascheit, and manages to track down and apprehend the Mage who cursed him. Unfortunately, all Waver can discover is that some unknown party wants him killed. After a discussion with Gray about what it means to save someone, Waver receives a call and heads out with Gray to handle another matter.
1	"Babylon, the Condemned, and Memories of the King ~Please add "II" to "Lord El-Melloi." The name is a heavy burden for me to bear.~" Transliteration: "Babiron to keishi-sha to ō no kioku" (Japanese: バビロンと刑死者と王の記憶)	July 6, 2019
Three years after the Fourth Holy Grail War, Waver is brought before Reines, who asks him why he borrowed a huge sum of money to buy and take over the El-Melloi Class at the Clock Tower. Waver explains that after the War, he traveled to Babylon in Iraq to follow Iskandar's footsteps, but was kidnapped by a rogue Mage named Barzan. Waver is then reunited with Melvin Weins, a classmate who also ended up as one of Barzan's victims. Together, they escape their cell and discover that Barzan is attempting to dig up Iskander's tomb. Enraged, Waver disrupts the magical leyline underneath the tomb, causing numerous evil spirits to attack and kill Barzan. Upon returning to London, Waver is troubled by his lingering guilt over his involvement in Kayneth's death which caused the El-Melloi family to fall onto hard times and convinces Melvin to help him buy the El-Melloi Class. Reines is intrigued by Waver's motivations and has him agree to three conditions in return for his life: assume the El-Melloi family's massive debt, find a way to repair the El-Melloi family's damaged magic crest, and succeed Kayneth as Lord El-Melloi to represent Reines at the Clock Tower until she comes of age. Waver's only condition is that he be referred to as "Lord El-Melloi II", since he feels he is not worthy to be compared to Kayneth. In the present day, Waver meets with Reines and Melvin as they assign him a new case.
2	"The Seven Stars and the Eternal Cage ~Not even the stars' luster can last forever.~" Transliteration: "Nanatsu no Hoshi to Eien no Hako" (Japanese: 七つの星と永遠の檻(はこ)	July 13, 2019
Waver is assigned to investigate the mysterious death of Ernest Fargo, the father of one of his former students, Mary. Upon arriving at the Fargo mansion, Waver meets Mary, her cousin Alec, Ernest's research partner Fernando Li and the family maid Claire. They show Waver Ernest's body, which has been separated into seven pieces spread throughout the mansion. The suspicion is that Ernest's body is being used for some sort of Magecraft ritual, but nobody has been able to figure it out. Upon observing the mansion's residents, Waver deduces all four of them had motive to kill Ernest; Mary stands to inherit his fortune, Alec owed massive debts to him, Fernando may be trying to steal his research and Claire was being physically abused by him. However, Alec is suddenly killed under mysterious circumstances, leading Waver to figure out what happened. He tells the others Ernest sacrificed himself in an experimental Magecraft ritual to bind his soul to the mansion, making him effectively immortal, but the ritual failed, making his spirit incomplete. Ernest's spirit attacks them, but he is destroyed by Gray, who possesses a scythe specialized in destroying the undead. With the case closed, Waver and Gray prepare to return home when Waver voices his suspicion that Mary allowed Ernest to go through with the ritual knowing it would fail. Mary admits that it was the only way to escape Ernest's abusive treatment over her.
3	"Thunder and the Underground Labyrinth ~Sometimes, taking decisive action yields more than mere material rewards.~" Transliteration: "Raimei to Chika Meikyū" (Japanese: 雷鳴と地下迷宮)	July 20, 2019
Waver decides to investigate why his favorite tearoom has closed down, since it has been affecting his ability to teach his class. He discovers that a magical creature has damaged their electrical system and has been siphoning electricity. He follows the trail of the creature into the city sewers where he is attacked. Meanwhile, Gray becomes concerned when Waver does not return, and asks Flat and Svin to help search for him. They head down to the sewers where they found a wounded Waver and he warns them about the beast. Svin takes Waver back to his home to treated while Gray and Flat track the creature, reflecting on how Waver's class managed to collect all of the Clock Tower's misfits who couldn't find a place anywhere else. They manage to destroy the creature and uncover the workshop of Gurdoa Davenant, who is stealing electricity for his own experiments. Waver and Svin then return, with Waver pointing out that Gurdoa violated the Mage Association's rule to keep Magecraft secret, since his siphoning of electricity has been logged by the power company and people killed in his experiments have been reported missing by the media. He then presents a decree from the Mage Association stripping Gurdoa of his position. Shocked, Gurdoa surrenders without a fight. Later, Waver admits to his students that he was partly bluffing in that he would not have been able to face Davenant in a direct battle, but recounts how "some fool" taught him that showing confidence can yield favorable results. With the tearoom reopened, Waver has lunch with Gray, Reines, and Luviagelita Edelfelt, where Luvia tells Waver the two Mage Association positions for the upcoming 5th Holy Grail War have already been filled.
4	"A Workshop, a Grave, and a Necromancer ~I won't pass judgment on anything that has yet to be proven. That is the way of a scholar.~" Transliteration: "Kōbō to dzuka to Nekuromansā" (Japanese: 工房と塚と死霊魔術師 (ネクロマンサー))	July 27, 2019
Kairi Shishigou reanimates a skull, stating he wants to talk with it. At the Clock Tower, Waver accepts a job from a lecturer of Spiritual Evocation, Wills Pelham Codrington, who explains how his father created the Marburry Workshop out of wasteland, but the leylines became warped, resulting in freak lightning that has killed multiple Magus, including his father, and a dozen bystanders. With Sir Trevor dead, the resulting inheritance conflict between the branches to his house would hurt Bram Sophia-Ri, the next head of Spiritual Evocation, who Waver has agreed to do a favor for. Later at a cafe, Bram and Reines speak about Waver's obsession with the Holy Grail War and how he is willing to bow down to Bram, who is supposedly trying to arrange for Waver to participate. Waver, Wills, Gray, and Reines head to Marburry. On the way there, Wills admits the main Codrington family filed a complaint about the workshop to the policies department, who claim it will breach the rule of keeping magecraft a secret and needs to be handled by them. Policies member Hishiri Adashino arrests Wills on their arrival, stating he caused the leyline disruption and death of his father. A Codrington of the main family, Waletta, claims Trevor's traces within his remains have been erased, so he can't be resurrected to answer questions, something only a necromancer like Wills can do. Since this is circumstantial evidence and a vicious storm outside prevents anyone from leaving, Waver gets permission to investigate in the meantime. While in Trevor's study, Wills shows Waver a human-sized fairy who gives a silent warning before vanishing. He says she started appearing when the workshop was completed and every time she came to "warn him," someone died. Waver wonders if The Wild Hunt, an order of fairy knights, is involved. Reines finds a hidden corridor and takes Gray to investigate. They find an underground graveyard that force Reines's Mystic Eyes to activate. Kairi, a necromancer and friend of Wills, appears when their presence attracts spirits who mistaken them for tomb robbers. He chases the spirits away and takes them back. Waletta and Adashino privately chat, revealing they are conspiring to find Wills guilty so Marburry stays out of Bram's hands and returns to the main family. In the post-credit scene, Gray wakes Waver to tell him Waletta was killed by lightning, much to his shock.
5	"The Lance that Shines to the End of the World and the Fairy Eyes ~In the world of mages, it doesn't matter who did it, or how.~" Transliteration: "Saihate no yari to Yōsei me" (Japanese: 最果ての槍と妖精眼)	August 3, 2019
With Waletta's death, Adashino is further convinced Wills is the suspect, but Waver reminds her that his investigation is not yet complete. As Gray and Kairi gather research materials, they are attacked by a Black Dog fairy, which Gray destroys. Suspicious of why a Black Dog would target Gray in particular, Kairi confronts Waver about her true nature. Waver reveals Gray is connected to King Arthur and wields King Arthur's spear Rhongomyniad, which is disguised as a scythe to protect Gray's identity. Remembering King Arthur's connection to fairies, Waver solves the case and uses a ritual to summon Faye, the fairy woman Wills can see. Waver reveals that Trevor had been using the Marburry Workshop in conjunction with Wills' Fairy Eyes to secretly murder people and turn them into artificial Black Dogs so that he can open a portal to the fairy realm. Faye confirms Waver's theory and admits she killed Trevor to put a stop to his experiments and protect Wills. However, Waver's ritual inadvertently awakens Trevor's Black Dogs, in which they begin to attack the mansion. Gray rescinds the 2nd level restraint to activate her scythe's true form, the spear Rhongomyniad, and destroy the Black Dogs in one blow, but cannot close the fairy portal. Wills knows the only way to close the portal is to go through it himself and take his Fairy Eyes to the other side, so he crosses over with Faye. In the aftermath, Adashino reveals Wills was not born with his Fairy Eyes, and they were in fact obtained by Trevor through Rail Zeppelin, an underground group that specializes in trading Mystic Eyes on the black market. Policies' true motive was to obtain Trevor's records of Rail Zeppelin of which she provides a copy to Waver. Meanwhile, Kairi advises Gray to keep an eye on Waver, since his obsession with the Holy Grail War could lead him into trouble.
6	"A Girl, a Department Store, and a Gift ~Catch-as-catch-can is a game for the ladies!~" Transliteration: "Shōjo to Depāto to Purezento" (Japanese: 少女とデパートとプレゼント)	August 10, 2019
Seeing that Waver is clearly troubled about the upcoming Holy Grail War, Gray meets with Reines to ask her about what happened to Waver in the previous War. Reines agrees to tell Gray, but only if she goes out shopping with her. They head out to London's largest department store, Carnac, where they meet Luvia, who has become Carnac's new owner. The three girls spend the day shopping at the store until they stop to take a break. Reines then tells Gray about the nature of the Holy Grail War, as well as the fact that Waver's Servant was Iskandar. However, she does not know the full details of what Waver did during the War. Suddenly, the three girls find themselves trapped inside a bounded field, keeping them confined in an alternate version of the store. Both Reines and Luvia believe that somebody is targeting them, but Gray points out that Luvia's enchantments on the building meant to encourage customers to purchase items may have malfunctioned. Luvia leads them to the basement where the core of her enchantment, a gem encrusted Egyptian statue, is stored. Luvia single-handedly fights her way through the building's automated security system and destroys the statue, freeing them from the spell. Gray returns to Waver, intending to give him a gift, but Waver reveals that his greatest treasure, the piece of Iskandar's cloak he used to summon Iskandar, has been stolen by Rail Zeppelin. He shows a letter from Rail Zeppelin inviting him to their train that acts as their headquarters and asks Gray to accompany him.
7	"Rail Zeppelin (Note: Literal Translation: Demon Eyes Collection Train) 1/6: A Train Whistle of Departure and the First Murder ~Seeing was the first magical spell in human history.~" Transliteration: "Magan Shūshū Ressha 1/6 Tabidachi no kiteki to Daiichi no Satsujin" (Japanese: 魔眼蒐集列車1/6 旅立ちの汽笛と第一の殺人)	August 17, 2019
Waver, Gray, and Caules Forvedge head to the meeting point for Rail Zeppelin, where they encounter Adashino and Olga-Marie Arsimilat Animusphere, the daughter of the Lord of Astromancy. Olga-Marie warns Waver not to interfere with Astromancy's plans for the Mystic Eyes auction. Waver also notes the presence of many notable figures in the magic world, such as Karabo Frampton from the Holy Church. One of Waver's students, Yvette L. Lehrman, is also present due to her family connections. Meanwhile, Reines assigns both Kairi and Luvia to investigate who stole Iskandar's mantle from Waver. Gray meets with Yvette, who notes that she has trouble reading Gray's emotions with her Mystic Eye. Olga-Marie meets with Waver, telling him that she believes the highest class of Mystic Eyes, Rainbow Mystic Eyes, will be sold the auction and asks for his assistance in obtaining them, to which he agrees. Adashino is seen meeting with Fernando. Gray starts to feel motion sick and is helped by Karabo, who through his Mystic Eyes finds out about her connection to King Arthur. Gray confides in him that she is unsure if she's any use to Waver, but Karabo reassures her that she is necessary to him. Waver then confides in Gray that he knows if he brings back Iskandar, it is likely he will have no memory of him. No matter the result, he is determined to try and find out. Suddenly, they discover that Olga-Marie's assistant, Trisha Fellows, has been murdered and decapitated.
8	"Rail Zeppelin 2/6: Gordius Wheel and the Memory of the King of Conquerors ~And yet humans still become slaves to what they see.~" Transliteration: "Magan Shūshū Ressha 2/6 Gorudiasu Hoīru to Seifuku-ō no Kioku" (Japanese: 魔眼蒐集列車2/6 神威の車輪(ゴルディアス・ホイール)と征服王の記憶)	August 24, 2019
Both Waver and Karabo examine Trisha's body, concluding she was decapitated so that her Mystic Eyes, which can see the future, could be harvested. When suspicion falls upon Karabo, he reveals he was invited to Rail Zeppelin so he could sell his own Mystic Eyes, which can see the past and proven troublesome for him. Waver figures that the murderer has some way of concealing themselves from time, as neither Trisha nor Karabo's Mystic Eyes could see the person in the future or past. Waver then confronts Adashino about her presence on the train, and she reveals she is investigating the mysterious patron behind Gueldoa and Trevor's unsanctioned experiments. Waver and Gray then head out to meet the thief, only to be encountered by a Servant, Hephaestion. She reveals herself as Iskandar's confidante and is insulted at the thought that Waver was associated with Iskandar. She attacks the two with Iskandar's Noble Phantasm, Gordius Wheel. They are able to narrowly escape, but Waver ends up being wounded. Meanwhile, Luvia and Kairi continue their investigation, surmising that the thief is someone within the Modern Magecraft Theory Department. Melvin is upset that Waver went to Rail Zeppelin without him and reveals to Reines that he used his family finances to obtain his own invitation. Back on the train, Gray and Caules do their best to heal Waver and Olga-Marie provides a special panacea to help them. Caules tells Gray about his older sister, who inexplicably renounced her position as a Mage and handed it over to Caules. Gray is confident that Caules will surpass his sister, since Waver was able to see his potential. She then prays for Waver's survival.
9	"Rail Zeppelin 3/6: A Sibyl, Decision, and Child of Einnashe ~Invocation; A spell enabling you to project Heroic Spirits and Divine Spirits onto yourself, so that you can borrow their power.~" Transliteration: "Magan Shūshū Ressha 3/6 Miko to Ketsui to Ain'nasshu no Ko" (Japanese: 魔眼蒐集列車3/6 巫女と決意と腑海林(アインナッシュ)の仔)	August 31, 2019
The next morning, Waver is healed but still unconscious. Gray tells Olga-Marie about Hephaestion and Olga-Marie surmises that whoever stole Iskandar's Mantle used it as a catalyst to summon her, and that her master may be on the train. Suddenly, the train is forcibly diverted and stranded in the Child of Einnashe, a snowy forest that was once the reality marble of a Dead Apostle, making it hostile to humans. Olga-Marie decides to barricade herself in her own room, still not fully trusting Gray and Caules. Meanwhile, Kairi meets with his old friend Jean-Mario Supinerra, who has knowledge about the Clock Tower's inner workings. Kairi and Luvia ask him about a seven serial murders in London involving the beheading of people bearing Mystic Eyes, and he tells them both the Clock Tower and Holy Church investigated the case but covered up the findings. He also mentions Trisha had previously asked him about the murders as well. Back on Rail Zeppelin, Melvin arrives by helicopter and is shocked to see Waver's state. Karabo and Yvette then ask them for assistance in finding a way out of the Child of Einnashe, with the other Mages deciding to barricade themselves in their rooms. Gray and Melvin agree to help. As they venture out, Gray is caught up battling Hephaestion while the rest of the group restore the leyline and returns to the train. Meanwhile, Olga-Marie discovers a pocket space hidden in her room where Trisha's head has been. Adashino then breaks into Olga-Marie's room, thanking her for finding Trisha's head. Outside, Gray and Hephaestion continue to battle, despite risking being left behind by the train.
10	"Rail Zeppelin 4/6: Mystic Eyes of Transience and an Awakening Detective ~There is no crime without motive.~" Transliteration: "Magan Shūshū Ressha 4/6 Hōyō no Mame to Mezameru Tantei" (Japanese: 魔眼蒐集列車4/6 泡影の魔眼と目覚める探偵)	September 7, 2019
While unconscious, Waver encounters Kayneth in a dream, who asks him what his true desire is. Meanwhile, Hephaestion temporarily suspends her battle with Gray so they can take shelter from a snowstorm, telling her that a warrior should only die on a battlefield. Hephaestion then reflects that she and Gray are similar, as they both have deep loyalty to their masters. She warns Gray that Waver will die should he enter the Fifth Holy Grail War, but Gray is determined to carry out Waver's wishes. When the snowstorm subsides, Hephaestion part ways with Gray. Luvia and Kairi visit Mary, who was a friend of Trisha. Mary tells them that Lord Animusphere abandoned Olga-Marie, and his decision was connected with the Holy Grail War and the serial murderers, which was why Trisha decided to investigate. The only clue Mary can provide is that "a man without a heart" assisted in Lord Animusphere's investigations. From the clue, Luvia realizes Adashino is somehow involved. Back at Rail Zeppelin, Gray is able to catch up with train. Adashino then gathers all of the guests and accuses Karabo of killing Trisha, explaining that Trisha took measures to preserve her head so Olga-Marie could recover it and her last words uttered Karabo's name before expiring. A recovered Waver then intervenes and contests Adashino's theory, but Rail Zeppelin supports her by stating that Karabo's Mystic Eyes would have the power to murder Trisha and removes Karabo's eyes for the auction per their agreement. After talking with Karabo and Gray, Waver is certain that Trisha's murderer and the thief are the same person and becomes determined to solve the case.
11	"Rail Zeppelin 5/6: The Residual Image and Auctions ~This is no true case. It's the afterimage of what was once a case.~" Transliteration: "Magan Shūshū Ressha 5/6 Zanzō to Ōkushon" (Japanese: 魔眼蒐集列車5/6 残像とオークション)	September 14, 2019
Waver meets with Olga-Marie and convinces her to help him after he tells her Trisha's killer is still on the loose. Meanwhile, Kairi recruits the help of Flat and Svin as Waver secures Luvia's assistance after promising to provide personal lectures to her. He then studies a leyline map provided by Olga-Marie and, upon finding a connecting leyline between Britain and Japan, discovers Hephaestion is a fake. He also inspects a charm Trisha had been carrying when she died and realizes with the existence of the charm, Adashino's theory is impossible. The auction for Karabo's Mystic Eyes begins; Waver, Adashino, Melvin and Yvette aggressively bid for them. Waver keeps bidding despite not having enough funds in an effort to lure out the perpetrator. Once the bid reaches $500 million, Waver halts the auction to contest Adashino's theory of Trisha's death. First, he points out a critical assumption everyone on the train had made about the serial murders: they assumed the victims died since they were beheaded. In fact, a skilled Mage can easily keep a head alive. This lets them freely use the Mystic Eyes without having to rely on Rail Zeppelin to remove it. He then presents Trisha's charm, which would have protected her from Karabo's Mystic Eyes under normal circumstances, proving that a third party had manipulated Karabo into killing Trisha and performing the serial murders. As he points out that there is only one possible person with the skill and motive to carry out a plot this complex, a binding spell surrounds Caules and Trisha's head.
12	"Rail Zeppelin 6/6: Lightning and Shooting Star ~That is why I exist here, now.~" Transliteration: "Magan Shūshū Ressha 6/6 Raikō to Ryūsei" (Japanese: 魔眼蒐集列車6/6 雷光と流星)	September 21, 2019
Waver and Adashino bind Caules, who is revealed to be an imposter when the real Caules and Reines arrive thanks to a special "Touko Travel" spell cast by Flat, Svin, Luvia and Kairi. Waver then reveals that he and Adashino had been working together all along to lure him out. Caught in the act, the impostor reveals himself as Dr. Heartless, the previous head of Modern Magecraft. Waver deduces Heartless and Lord Animusphere had been working together to control information about the Holy Grail War by using the Mystic Eyes they gained from the serial murders. He further reveals that Heartless was working to create his own version of the Holy Grail: by sponsoring the Marburry workshop, including Waver in his plans due to his status as a former Master and by summoning the Child of Einnashe while linking the current leylines to Japan. Admitting his guilt, Heartless summons Hephaestion to protect him. Waver then reveals Hephastion is a "Faker" class servant, the nameless twin sister of the real Hephaestion and a body double for Iskandar meant to absorb any curses aimed at him. They retreat to the roof of the train and Heartless returns Iskandar's relic to Waver as they try to leave. Despite having it back, Waver taunts Faker with the fact that she didn't appear in Iskandar's Ionian Hetaroi, revealing her harbored hatred against Iskandar and infuriating her into attacking. Karabo, having regained his eyes, joins Gray in battling Faker. Heartless summons the Child of Einnashe to protect him, but the other Mages and Rail Zeppelin work together to defeat it. With Waver's help, Gray is able to score a critical hit on Faker, forcing her to use her Hecatic Wheel as a last resort. Gray, resolving to become someone who can protect Waver and others, removes the 3rd level restraint and uses the Rhongomyniad, firing it at Faker.
13	"The Clock Tower, Usual Days, and the First Step Forward to the Future ~Glory lies beyond the horizon – Challenge it because you know it to be unattainable.~" Transliteration: "Tokeitō to Nichijō to Mirai he no Daiipō" (Japanese: 時計塔と日常と未来への第一歩)	September 28, 2019
In the aftermath of the battle, Heartless and Faker are able to escape and Karabo is believed to have died from the injuries he suffered. Waver and Gray recover from the battle and meet with Adashino. Waver acknowledges they still don't know Heartless' full motive for creating a new Grail and Adashino admits she is pursuing Heartless as well, since he is her older half-brother. Reines meets with Olga-Marie and they agree to form a friendship/alliance. The holiday season begins in London. While buying groceries, Gray runs into Melvin who tells her that he is holding Waver's Magic Crest as collateral against the El-Melloi family's debt and warns her that Waver will likely die if he joins the Fifth Grail War. Later, a ceremony is held at the Clock Tower to celebrate Svin achieving the rank of Pride, the third-highest rank in the Clock Tower. Svin and the other students reflect on how much they learned from Waver's instruction. Waver privately laments to Gray about his inadequacy in comparison to Kayneth, but reveals he has decided not to participate in the Fifth Grail War. He realized that his desire to reunite with Iskandar is a selfish wish to fulfill his own desires and should instead focus on stopping Doctor Heartless. He assures Gray that he will need her strength for their eventual confrontation. Gray finally gives him the present she bought from Carnac, which Waver gratefully accepts. That night, Waver encounters Iskandar in a dream. When Iskandar asks if Waver will take his place at his side, Waver politely refuses; instead intending to forge his own path in the world of the living first. Iskandar then asks Waver if he's having fun with his current life and Waver confirms that he is. The next day, Waver continues to teach his class as normal.
SP	"Waver, Reunion, and the Magic Lantern ~ Therein lay all the answers as to why you chose me.~" Transliteration: "Weibā to Dōsōkai to Gentō-ki" (Japanese: ウェイバーと同窓会と幻灯機)	December 31, 2021
Waver receives an invitation from Olga-Marie, so he brings Gray to meet her, unexpectedly reuniting with two of his classmates, Amleth and Camus. Both of them are experts on projection magic, and are working on technology that will allow them to create a perfect copy of the world. Camus asks to take a picture with Waver, to which he agrees. The next day, Waver wakes up to find his body has reverted to his high school age. Despite appealing for help from his friends, students, and Clock Tower faculty, nobody is able to figure the cause of his condition or how to reverse it. All he knows is that he has been afflicted by a very powerful spell affecting his and everybody's perception of him, with the risk his younger existence will completely overwrite his old one. After receiving some information from Adashino and meeting Camus again, Waver begins to suspect Camus' involvement. On Christmas, Waver attends his class reunion despite his current condition, and is surprised to discover the majority of his classmates have had little success in their careers with the exception of himself, Amleth, and Camus. Amleth then reveals his project, using Shell Projection to revert his classmates back to their younger forms. However, Waver reveals he has figured out that Amleth and Camus used him as the core of the Shell Projection, constructing everybody's younger forms from his own memories. Amleth was deep in debt, and Camus manipulated him into perfecting her research as revenge for an incident he caused that damaged her magical circuit. Camus reveals that her motive is no longer revenge before using the Shell Projection to create an entire artificial reality based on Waver's memories as a student in the Clock Tower. However, Waver predicted this and prepared protective talismans for himself and Reines to avoid being brainwashed by the Shell Projection, as well as having his students teleport Gray into the Shell Projection so she can track down its core. Gray destroys the core of the spell while Waver confronts Camus directly, telling her he realized too late how fondly she viewed him, and he assures her that he will still keep her in his memories. Moved by Waver's sincerity, Camus deactivates the Shell Projection. Afterwards, Amleth is pinned with the blame of the Shell Projection and forced to default on his debts, while Camus' status as a Mage is revoked due to the complete destruction of her magic circuit. Waver and Camus part ways amicably, and he and Gray spend Christmas together with his students and Olga-Marie watching a movie.

=== Video games ===
Characters of the novel series also appeared in Delightworks's mobile role playing game Fate/Grand Order as special servants based on the characters. Waver Velvet/Lord El-Melloi II is a main five-star Caster-class Servant under the name of Zhuge Liang and has appeared in the Fate/Accel Zero Order event as a main character and guide. Gray, Reines (under the name of Sima Yi) and Luvia (under the name of Astraea) all were added as servants in the Lady Reines' Case Files collaboration event. Both Gray and Luvia are four-star Assassin and Ruler class Servants respectively, however Reines is a five-star just like her adoptive older brother, in the Rider class.

=== Stage play ===
A stage play adaptation based on the novel's "Adra Castle Separation" chapter, began on December 14, 2019, and concluded on January 19, 2020. Voice Actors Daisuke Ono, Akio Ōtsuka and Takumi Yamazaki, who voice Add, Rider (Iskandar) and Kayneth El-Melloi Archibald respectively, reprised their roles for the play. Limited release of the musical was released on blu-ray July 8, 2020.

Character	Actor
Lord El-Melloi II	Yuya Matsushita
Gray	Saho Aono
Flat Escardos	Takeru Naya
Svin Glascheit	Ryūjirō Izaki
Reines El-Melloi Archisorte	Kaho Amasaki
Heine Istari	Hiroki Hyakuna
Jirōbō Seigen Tokitō	Yūya Kido
Flueger	Shinya Matsuda
Boyservant	Fūta Kimura
Rosalind Istari	Ribeka Tanemura
Waver Velvet	Shinichiroh Ueda
Luviagelita Edelfelt	Nami Tamaki
Orlocke Caesarmund	Osamu Kaō
Hishiri Adashino	Kazuho Sō
