= Waver Velvet =

Fictional character from Fate/Zero

- Fate character
- Waver Velvet as illustrated by Takashi Takeuchi
- First appearance: Fate/Zero (2006)
- First game: Fate/Grand Order (2015)
- Created by: Gen Urobuchi
- Voiced by: English: Lucien Dodge (Zero, UBW, Apocrypha, Case Files) Leraldo Anzaldua (Prisma Illya); Japanese: Daisuke Namikawa

In-universe information
- Title: Lord El-Melloi II

Waver Velvet (Japanese: ウェイバー・ベルベット, Hepburn: Weibā Berubetto) is a fictional character first introduced in Type Moon's prequel light novel, Fate/Zero, written by Gen Urobuchi and Takashi Takeuchi. Waver is depicted as a nineteen-year-old student studying at the Clock Tower. He then joins the Fourth Holy Grail War in Fuyuki, Japan and becomes the Master of Rider, after stealing his teacher's artifact in hopes of forcing the Mages' Association to recognize his genius by winning the War. Upon returning, he later becomes a professor and the Dean of Norwich, the Modern Magecraft Theory Department of the Clock Tower. As the main protagonist in the spin-off light novel The Case Files of Lord El-Melloi II by Makoto Sanda, Waver is formally given the title of Lord El-Melloi II (ロード・エルメロイII世, Rōdo Erumeroi Nisei), after being adopted into the El-Melloi family. He returns in the sequel The Adventures of Lord El-Melloi II, and made recurring appearances in other Fate series.

Waver is voiced by Daisuke Namikawa in all of his appearances in Japanese, with multiple actors reprising the role in English appearances. His design was created by Takashi Takeuchi as a young bishonen. The character was created by Urobuchi in an attempt to balance the cast of Fate/Zero with Waver displaying more weak traits as young man who would develop into a fine adult through the events of the narrative. His El-Melloi persona was written by Makoto Sanda as a grown man sharing detective dynamics with his assistant Gray inspired by Sherlock Holmes. Urobuchi expressed mixed feelings when Sanda handled his character but still felt it was well developed.

Critical reception to Waver's role in Fate/Zero have been mostly positive. Multiple writers enjoyed the dynamic he has with his servant Rider due to how open they are with each other, with Waver maturing thanks to the interactions. In regards to his role in his spin-off series, Waver stood out from how he comes across as a more appealing main character than in Fate/Zero due to his growth as a teacher as he deals with multiple students.

== Appearances ==
=== Fate/Zero ===
Waver was a student of the Mineralogy Department. After he gets humiliated in front of the entire class by his teacher when he submitted an essay explaining that anyone can become a great mage as long they work hard and practice, Waver decides to participate in the Holy Grail War after stealing his artifact and plans to use the Grail to force the Mages' Association to recognize his genius. With the artifact, he manages to summon, Iskandar (better known as Alexander the Great) of the Rider class. Despite his difficulties with Rider's overbearing nature, Waver and his Servant form a strong relationship. When the War nearly comes to an end, the two are about to be killed by the servant Archer, Iskandar convinces his master to instead become his servant, which Waver agrees happily. Archer kills Iskandar but spares Waver in compassion for Iskandar's values of his own master and Waver's newfound will to live for Iskandar. He decides to take a trip to see the world before returning to the Clock Tower to resume his studies.

=== Unlimited Blade Works ===
Though Waver does not appear in Fate/stay night, he makes an appearance in the epilogue of Ufotable's anime adaptation of Unlimited Blade Works as he walks down the hallway of the Clock Tower and meets the student Shirou Emiya. Waver asks Shirou for his reasons to study magecraft at the Clock Tower. Shirou replies that he wants to become a hero of justice. While Waver accepts that while his dream might be foolish, he thinks it might be too big for the Clock Tower to contain.

=== The Case Files of Lord El-Melloi II ===
After the events of Fate/Zero, he returns to the Clock Tower to resume his study of magecraft. The previous Lord El-Melloi, Kayneth El-Melloi Archibald, who was Waver's former professor, had been killed during the events of Fate/Zero which resulted in a sharp decline of the El-Melloi clan. After discovering what happened to his former teacher and feeling responsible for his death, Waver borrowed a loan from an old friend named Melvin Weins to purchase the El-Melloi Classroom and began to teach Modern Magecraft. Reines El-Melloi Archisorte, the next heir of the clan and Kayneth's niece by blood, discovered the purchase of the classroom and requested Waver to take the title of El-Melloi while temporarily become the head until she becomes of age to do so. Waver accepts as long as he is known as Lord El-Melloi II, as he feels unworthy to be compared to his predecessor and teacher. For 10 years, Waver has been a popular professor of the Clock Tower.

=== Fate/Grand Order ===
In Delightworks' mobile role-playing game Fate/Grand Order and its arcade version made by Sega, Waver appears as a five star Caster Pseudo-Servant under the name of Zhuge Liang (諸葛孔明, Shokatsu Kōmei), also known as Zhuge Kongming. In the main story, he first appears in the singularity of Septem without a master, but was the strategist for a younger Iskandar (known as Alexander). Then later reappears in the final singularity of Solomon as one of the servants to help Ritsuka Fujimaru in the final battle. He also appears in both of the Fate/Accel Zero Order and Lady Reines' Case Files collaboration events as a main and supporting character. Due to being a Pseudo-Servant, Waver explains that he is not himself nor Zhuge Liang, but the both of them combined. As he reaches his third ascension, his appearance changes to his younger self. In battle, he uses bagua mirrors that shoots energy beams and can cast various elemental spells such as earth, wind and fire. He also holds Zhuge Liang's feather fan. His Noble Phantasms are Unreturning Formation and Chu Shi Biao.

=== Other appearances ===
Waver appears in Fate/Apocrypha, Fate/strange fake and Fate/kaleid liner Prisma Illya as a supporting character.

== Creation and conception ==
Waver (as Lord El-Melloi II), illustrated by Mineji Sakamoto

From the original light novel, Urobuchi wrote Waver as a young child who would seek his path to become an adult going through a traumatic events. Waver was a conceptualized as a weak character similar to Nobita Nobi from Doraemon in the making of Fate/Zero. However, he had grown to the point at the end where he could be mistaken for the protagonist. Artist Takashi Takeuchi said his original design motif was "sarcastic, smart-alecky boy". He had no trouble designing Waver because he had a clear image of the character. He really wanted to draw him and feels the design that makes him look incompetent was for the best. Takeuchi was satisfied with the way Waver was received in the light novels and hoped the anime adaptation would demonstrate a similar success. Takeuchi described the incarnation of Waver as a "heroine" based on how the company Ufotable portrayed him, but viewers would still come to like his character.

The prospect of seeing another author write about Waver as he was developing as a mage, able to do nothing but sit back and watch as events unfolded around him, was a difficult part for Urobuchi. However, that worry was for nothing according to in the end. The character's growth was so big that he became different from the original version. Urobuchi describes him as "the gentleman who had polished his powers of analysis, bearing a cunning like an old man's wisdom, while still hiding the distortion of his youth somewhere in his heart" making him, in the end, an "enchanting character."

Waver was redesigned as an adult in The Case Files of Lord El-Melloi II. The artists described him as an attractive longhaired inspired by Saki Vashtar Area 88. This was found more common in the manga adaptation of the light novel though the artists always found Waver's design to have always been the bishonen stereotype. The novelists describes the El-Melloi as a quiet man with a sense of humor as the writer wanted him to be found appealing by the reader. In the making of the light novel, Waver's character was influenced by Sherlock Holmes with Gray serving as his sidekick Dr. Watson. The relationship between these two characters was primarily centered by the Gray's weaker persona who constantly thinks about his master and the writer aimed to attract the female demographic throughout this.

When The Case Files of Lord El-Melloi II was adapted into an anime, Director Ei Aoki wanted to supervise the series due to him originally directing Fate/Zero where Waver originated. His biggest difficulty was El-Melloi interacting with his assistant Gray which led him to ask for the voice actress for help.

In Japanese, Waver has been consistently voiced by Daisuke Namikawa. He considered voicing Waver as a difficult task based on the popularity of the franchise. While in English, he was voiced by Lucien Dodge in Fate/Zero, Unlimited Blade Works, Fate/Apocrypha and Case Files, and by Leraldo Anzaldua in the first two seasons of Fate/kaleid liner Prisma Illya. Dodge described the older Waver as a man with "10,000x more grump". Yuya Matsushita and Shinichiroh Ueda portrayed his older and younger self, respectively, in the stage play adapting the Adra Castle Separation chapter from the light novel.

== Reception ==
Kotaku listed Waver as one of the multiple characters from Fate/Zero who suffers a tragic fate despite him initially not having anything to lose in the beginning. Koi-nya felt that thanks to Waver, the viewers would care about his servant. Anime News Network praised the relationship between Waver and Iskandar due to how different they are from each other yet Waver becomes a stronger person little by little thanks to his Servant. Another review found the relationship unique among the cast due to the friendly bonds the two have in contrast to other characters who suffer a distanced relationship with their servants. In early reviews, The Fandom Posted found Waver as a fun comic relief based on how in his characterization while UK Anime Network stated that Waver was one of the members from the cast that was complex due to his need for a servant. In a later review, the same site regarded Waver and Iskander as their favorite master and servant relationship from Fate/Zero, enjoying their character arcs as Waver overcomes his inferiority complex across the narrative. Fandom Post also felt that Waver and Iskander were their favorite characters from Fate/Zero as they "have so many great conversations and style of interaction" with how Waver learns about his servant's desire to conquer lands whenever interacting again. Capsule Monster regarded their bond as "a companionship that's simply heartwarming to watch." Anime News Network listed Waver and Iskander as one of the "manliest bromances" with focus on their friendship. He was also voted the third best master from Fate/Zero in a 2012 poll.

In regards to Waver's role in the spin-off The Case Files of Lord El-Melloi II, Manga.Tokyo found his personality appealing describing him as "bolder" as well as underdog. The reviewer also enjoyed the premise from the series in regards to how many jobs the older Waver has to work into. Krestel Swift from The Fandom Post described the older Waver as "uncharacteristically suave hunk with seemingly neither awkwardness nor a sense of humor" and praised the series how the narrative of Lord El-Melloi II handles his growth ever since Fate/Zero due to his different personality. Anime News Network described him as a funny character based on his reactions despite the series' dark tone as the episodes often involve murder. Despite criticism to the anime's lack of closure, The Fandom Post enjoyed the handling of Waver's past persona during the dream sequence he has, as he reflects on his past when interacting with Iskander. Anime News Network writers Theron Martin and Michelle Liu listed El-Melloi II as the best anime character of 2019 due to his style when dealing with enemies. Liu regarded him as one of the best LGBTQ+ character, something she found that while it might come across as controversial, both Waver's younger persona from Fate/Zero and Lord El-Melloi II was often commented by writers and him to have developed romantical feelings for Iskandar, something which Iskandar was famous in real life.
