= Fate/Strange Fake =

Japanese light novel and manga series

- First light novel volume cover, featuring Enkidu (left) and Gilgamesh (right)
- Genre: Action
- Created by: Type-Moon
- Light novel
- Written by: Ryōgo Narita
- Illustrated by: Morii Shizuki
- Published by: ASCII Media Works
- English publisher: NA: Yen Press
- Imprint: Dengeki Bunko
- Original run: January 10, 2015 – present
- Volumes: 9
- Manga
- Illustrated by: Morii Shizuki
- Published by: Type-Moon
- Imprint: Type-Moon Books
- Original run: January 10, 2015 – present
- Volumes: 5
- Anime television film

Fate/Strange Fake: Whispers of Dawn
- Directed by: Shun Enokido; Takahito Sakazume
- Produced by: Shizuka Kurosaki
- Written by: Daisuke Ōhigashi
- Music by: Hiroyuki Sawano
- Studio: A-1 Pictures
- Licensed by: NA: Aniplex of America
- Original network: Tokyo MX, GYT, BS11, GTV
- English network: SEA: Aniplus
- Released: July 2, 2023
- Runtime: 55 minutes
- Anime television series
- Directed by: Shun Enokido; Takahito Sakazume
- Produced by: Sachio Fujita (animation)
- Written by: Daisuke Ōhigashi
- Music by: Hiroyuki Sawano
- Studio: A-1 Pictures
- Licensed by: NA: Aniplex of America
- Original network: Tokyo MX, GYT, BS11, GTV
- Original run: December 31, 2024 – present
- Episodes: 13
- icon

Fate/Strange Fake (stylized as Fate/strange Fake) is a Japanese light novel series in Type-Moon's Fate franchise, written by Ryōgo Narita and illustrated by Morii Shizuki. It was originally showcased on Narita's website under the title of Fake/States Night on April 1, 2008, presented as a prologue and introduction for a role playing style game as an April Fool's prank. It was later removed, but was later re-released in the form of a novel included as an extra with the magazine Type-Moon Ace 2 in 2009, with illustrations by Morii Shizuki and an afterword by the author.

In 2014, it was announced that both a novel and manga series would be published and a brief trailer was made. An anime television special produced by A-1 Pictures titled Fate/Strange Fake: Whispers of Dawn premiered in July 2023, which adapts most of the chapters of the first volume. An anime television series adaptation also produced by A-1 Pictures premiered its first episode in December 2024 (with Whispers of Dawn being a prologue), while later episodes aired from January to March 2026. A second season has been announced.

== Plot ==
The series focuses on a Grail War copied from the Third Holy Grail war in Fuyuki City. At the end, an organization from the United States that has magi separate from the London-based Mage Association as members took data from Fuyuki's Grail War and planned their own ritual. After 70 years, they used the city Snowfield as the Sacred Land for their own Grail War and failed to copy every aspect of the ritual, which led to it acting only as an imitation that has lost the Saber class.

The Mage's Association had sent Langal and his pupil, Faldeus, to investigate the city and the status of the war. Faldeus, a spy from the US organization, has Langal sniped upon arrival, despite knowing that Langal was simply a puppet. He announces that their Holy Grail War has been in development and that it is real, which causes an uproar at the Clock Tower, and wishes to "advertise" the project to the Association.

== Characters ==
=== Main characters ===
Ayaka Sajyou (アヤカ・サジョウ, Ayaka Sajō)
Voiced by: Kana Hanazawa (Japanese); Anjali Kunapaneni (English)
The series' main protagonist, Ayaka is the seventh Master in the True and Fake Holy Grail Wars and the Master of Saber.
Saber (セイバー, Seibā; –) Richard I (リチャード一世, Richādo Issei)
Voiced by: Yūki Ono (Japanese); Ben Balmaceda (English)
A Saber-Class Servant accidentally summoned after Cashura's death and also Ayaka's Heroic Servant, known also as the Lionheart.
Tiné Chelc (ティーネ・チェルク, Tīne Cheruku)
Voiced by: Sumire Morohoshi (Japanese); Dani Chambers (English)
The Master of False Archer in the True and Fake Holy Grail Wars. Tiné's people are an indigenous people who had apparently kept watch over the Snowfield region for a thousand years before, in the early twentieth century, they were driven out by the government and the group of mages looking to prepare the land for the False Holy Grail War. Tiné participates in the War seemingly with the intent to return her people to their rightful place. She does not have a particular wish for the Holy Grail to grant.
Tsubaki Kuruoka (繰丘 椿, Kuruoka Tsubaki)
Voiced by: Aoi Koga (Japanese); Kimberley Anne Campbell (English)
The Master of False Rider in the True and Fake Holy Grail Wars. She was born to Eastern-Asian magi parents in their thirties seeking for ways to further their future in the world of magecraft. They were among those who managed to take the actual machinery underlying the Fuyuki Holy Grail War system, and while there, also obtained partial knowledge on Zouken Matou's magecraft.
Orlando Reeve (オーランド・リーヴ, Ōrando Rīvu)
Voiced by: Wataru Hatano (Japanese); Christopher Wehkamp (English)
The Master of False Caster in the True and Fake Holy Grail Wars. He is the police chief of Snowfield. He is a magus who has gone to great lengths to prepare for the Holy Grail War. He has known of the ritual, and he is disappointed in the government for their decision to advertise it to outsiders.
Jester Karture (ジェスター・カルトゥーレ, Jesutā Karutūre)
Voiced by: Tatsumaru Tachibana (Japanese); Clifford Chapin (English)
The Master of False Assassin in the True and Fake Holy Grail Wars. He is a Dead Apostle known as the Six Hearted Revolver (六連男装, Rokuren Dansō) who has taken interest in the Holy Grail to grant his wish. As it is his first time participating in such a battle, he researched the nature of the ritual and plans to summon a Servant of the Assassin class.
Flat Escardos (フラット・エスカルドス, Furatto Esukarudosu)
Voiced by: Yoshitsugu Matsuoka (Japanese); Khoi Dao (English)
Flat is the Master of False Berserker in the True and Fake Holy Grail Wars. He was born into the Escardos family, a line of magi living on the coast of the Mediterranean Sea, as the eldest son. Although his teacher dislikes letting unprepared magi into the world, he came to regret keeping Flat around.
The Synthetic beast Silver Wolf (Chimera) (銀狼の合成獣（キメラ）, Ginrō no Gōseijū (Kimera))
The Wolf is the Master of False Lancer in the True and Fake Holy Grail Wars. He is a silver wolf familiar of the magus originally planning to participate in the Holy Grail War.
Sigma (シグマ, Shiguma)
Voiced by: Gakuto Kajiwara (Japanese); Paul Castro Jr. (English)
Sigma is the Master of Watcher in the True and Fake Holy Grail Wars. He is the product of the rape of Maiya Hisau by an unknown soldier.
Faldeus Dioland (ファルデウス・ディオランド, Farudeusu Diorando)
Voiced by: Junya Enoki (Japanese); Micah Solusod (English)
Faldeus is the Master of True Assassin in the True and Fake Holy Grail Wars. He is a magus belonging to the government organization responsible for starting the False Holy Grail War, and despite seeming to be barely past his mid-twenties, displays knowledge of the events 70 years prior as if having had experienced them personally.
Bazdilot Cordelion (バズディロット・コーデリオン, Bazudirotto Kōderion)
Voiced by: Kenta Miyake (Japanese); Cory Yee (English)
Bazdilot is the Master of True Archer in the True and Fake Holy Grail Wars. He is a ruthless murderer in service of the Scladio crime family.
Francesca Prelati (フランチェスカ・プレラーティ, Furanchesuka Purerāti)
Voiced by: Maaya Uchida (Japanese); Deneen Melody (English)
The Master of True Caster during the True and Fake Holy Grail Wars. She is originally the child of Átē, the Greek Goddess of madness and folly who was discarded by Zeus to the human realm onto the land where Troy would be built. Despite being originally male with her first death establishing him as a Heroic Spirit separate from his original self, Francesca survived by possessing numerous bodies over the years regardless of gender.
Haruri Borzak (ハルリ・ボルザーク, Haruri Boruzāku)
Voiced by: Hina Yōmiya (Japanese); Aria Saltini (English)
Haruri is the Master of True Berserker during the True and Fake Holy Grail Wars. She is the granddaughter of Odd Borzak, a magus killed by Kiritsugu Emiya as shown in Fate/Zero, which then left his surviving family to be attacked for his research, leaving only Haruri, his granddaughter, as the only survivor. Haruri wishes to use the Grail to render all methods of concealment used by Magi ineffective, compromising their society's secrecy.
Archer (アーチャー, Āchā; –) Gilgamesh (ギルガメッシュ, Girugamesshu)
Voiced by: Tomokazu Seki (Japanese); David Vincent (English)
The overly arrogant King of Heroes who once ruled Uruk with his friend Enkidu, appearing during the Fourth and Fifth Holy Grail Wars of Fuyuki. He was brought into the False Holy Grail War as a Servant of Tiné Chelc, who killed his original Master, a magus whose ancestor acquired the discarded key to Gilgamesh's treasure vault that he used for the summoning ritual instead of the first skin shed by a snake.
Lancer (ランサー, Ransā; –) Enkidu (エルキドゥ, Erukidu)
Voiced by: Yū Kobayashi (Japanese); Marin Miller (English)
Gilgamesh's only friend who was summoned as Lancer-class Servant by the Wolf during the False Holy Grail War. Shaped from clay by their parents Anu and Aruru, lacking any gender, Enkidu was placed in the wilderness where they met and befriended Gilgamesh before they died as a result of Ishtar's machinations.
Rider (ライダー, Raidā; –) Pale Rider (ペイルライダー, Peiru Raidā)
The Servant summoned by Tsubaki Kuruoka in the True and Fake Holy Grail Wars. Pale Rider the embodiment of pestilence given form by the False Grail, being different from those called Heroic Spirits, "he" is only one in name.
Caster (キャスター, Kyasutā) - Alexandre Dumas (アレクサンドル・デュマ, Arekusandoru Dyuma)
Voiced by: Showtaro Morikubo (Japanese); Frank Todaro (English)
Caster is the Servant summoned by Orlando Reeve in the True and Fake Holy Grail Wars. In life, he met Hans Christian Andersen while living in Paris around 1843. Caster is also the author of The Count of Monte Cristo, which features the fictional character Edmond Dantès.
Assassin (アサシン, Asashin) - No Name Assassin (名も無きアサシン, Namonaki Asashin)
Voiced by: Lynn (Japanese); Jeannie Tirado (English)
The Servant summoned by Jester Karture in the True and Fake Holy Grail Wars, whose True Name has been forsaken as of her death before the time she became a Heroic Spirit.
Berserker (バーサーカー, Bāsākā) - Jack the Ripper (ジャック・ザ・リッパー, Jakku za Rippā)
Voiced by: Kenyu Horiuchi (Japanese); Joe J. Thomas (English)
Berserker is Flat Escardos' Servant who summoned during the True and Fake Holy Grail Wars. Having no true form or soul due being the embodiment of mystery behind another bestowed the moniker of Jack the Ripper, the Berserker servant is a shapeshifter who can disguise himself as a watch Flat keeps on his person and assumed the forms of those speculated to have been the killer as an "emblem of madness". His Noble Phantasms are From Hell, turning into a demonic representation of Jack the Ripper, and Natural Born Killers where he conjures multiple bodies depending on his Master's quantity of Mana.
True Archer (真アーチャー, Shin Āchā) - Alcides (アルケイデス, Arukeidesu)
Voiced by: Tadahisa Saizen (Japanese); Chris Jai Alex (English)
The Servant of Bazdilot Cordelion in the True and Fake Holy Grail Wars. He has also been granted attributes of an Avenger-class Servant through the machinations of his Master and whose divinity has been lost through interference from his Master's Command Spells awakening past memories from his life and mud from the Fuyuki Grail.
True Rider (真ライダー, Shin Raidā; –) Hippolyta (ヒッポリュテー, Hipporyutē)
Voiced by: Akira Sekine (Japanese); Rebecca Wang (English)
The Servant of Verner Caesarmund and the rest of the El-Melloi Classroom in the True and Fake Holy Grail Wars.
True Assassin (真アサシン, Shin Asashin) - Hassan of the Fathomless Rift (幽弋のハサン, Yūyoku no Hasan)
Voiced by: Makoto Yasumura (Japanese); Bill Butts (English)
The Servant of Faldeus Dioland in the True and Fake Holy Grail Wars. He came to hold the title of "Old Man of the Mountain" by becoming the "shadow of death" rather than become one of the nineteen leaders of the Hashshashin.
True Caster (真キャスター, Shin Kyasutā; –) François Prelati (フランソワ・プレラーティ, Furansowa Purerāti)
Voiced by: Maaya Uchida (Japanese); Deneen Melody (English)
The Servant of Francesca Prelati in the True and Fake Holy Grail Wars. François' appearance is based on Francesca's time with both Joan of Arc and Gilles de Rais, the latter helping him with financial difficulties through alchemy.
True Berserker (真バーサーカー, Shin Bāsākā; –) Huwawa (フワワ, Fuwawa)
The Servant of Haruri in the True Holy Grail War. The beast of the Cedar Forest in Mesopotamian mythology. The Mesopotamian gods forced together the souls of 2,891 human children and gave them life as a complete being.
Watcher (ウォッチャー, Wocchā)
The Watcher-class Servant summoned by Sigma in the True Holy Grail War of Fate/strange Fake. Watcher's True Name is unknown, censored as "○○○-○○○○, also known as ○○○○○○○". Despite being described as a Heroic Spirit, she is said to be an abnormal phenomenon that would be hard to call a hero, god, or demon.
The Watcher also possesses Shadows, which appears as manifestations only Sigma can see and hear using the guise of seven heroic spirits, which includes:
- The Captain

Voiced by: Naoya Uchida

- Icarus (イーカロス, Īkarosu)

Voiced by: Shoya Chiba (Japanese); Kevin K. Gomez (English)

- Asclepius (アスクレピオス, Asukurepiosu)

Voiced by: Ryōta Suzuki (Japanese); Lucien Dodge (English)

- Orion (オリオン, Orion)

Voiced by: Nobutoshi Canna (Japanese); Tony Oliver (English)

- Kanemaki Jisai (鐘捲自斎, Kanemaki Jisai)

Voiced by: Shinpachi Tsuji

- Amelia Earhart (アメリア・イアハート, Ameria Iahāto)

Voiced by: Yoko Hikasa

- Étienne of Cloyes (エティエンヌ, Etiennu)

Voiced by: Akeno Watanabe

Ishtar (イシュタル, Ishutaru)
Voiced by: Yui Makino (Japanese); Risa Mei (English)
The goddess of Mesopotamian mythology.

=== Secondary characters ===
Clan Calatin
Clan Calatin is the codename of a group of magi police officers serving under Orlando, granted various Noble Phantasms created by Caster.
John Wingard is one of the officers, and after having his right hand cut by Jester Karture, Alexandre Dumas gives him an artificial hand that has a built-in dagger coated in Hydra venom. During the battle with Alcides, Dumas decides to make John into a hero, and uses his second Noble Phantasm, Musketeers' Masquerade, to empower John, allowing him to fight on par with Alcides.
Hansa Cervantes (ハンザ・セルバンテス, Hanza Serubantesu)
Voiced by: Katsuyuki Konishi (Japanese); Kevin Andrew Rivera (English)
Hansa is a priest and a member of the church.
Lord El-Melloi II (ロード・エルメロイII世, Rōdo Erumeroi Nisei)
Voiced by: Daisuke Namikawa (Japanese); Lucien Dodge (English)
Lord El-Melloi II is highly regarded in the Clock Tower and he is the professor of Flat.
Langal (ランガル, Rangaru)
Voiced by: Shunsuke Sakuya (Japanese); David W. Collins (English)
Langal was sent by the Mage's Association to investigate the Snowfield's Grail War. At some point in the past, Langal took Faldeus Dioland as his student, unaware that the younger man was a spy for the American organisation.
Fillia (フィリア, Firia)
Voiced by: Yui Makino (Japanese); Risa Mei (English)
She is an Einzbern homunculus involved in the False Holy Grail War of Fate/strange Fake. For unknown reasons, she gave Ayaka her five special Command Seals and told her to go to Snowfield. As of the summoning of True Berserker, her body has been possessed by the goddess Ishtar.
El-Melloi Classroom
The students of Lord El-Melloi II and classmates of Flat. Many of the students of the El-Melloi Classroom travel to Snowfield after the death of Flat Escardos and the emergence of Thia Escardos. It is revealed they are collectively the Masters of Hippolyta in the True and False Holy Grail Wars, with the exception of Yvette, who was excluded as a liability that would betray them whenever she found it funny and thus was not granted a Command Spell by Verner. Although one of the Command Spells is shared among the entire class, Verner holds the other two completely. They consist of Verner Caesarmund, Svin Glascheit, Yvette L. Lehrman, Caules Forvedge, Nazica Pentel, Radia Pentel, Roland Berzinsky, Rin Tohsaka, Luviagelita Edelfelt, Fezgram vor Sembren, Org Rum, and Mary Lil Fargo.
Thia Escardos (ティア・エスカルドス, Tia Esukarudosu)
Thia Escardos is a being created as the culmination of the 1800-year-old plan devised by Mesala Escardos of the Escardos family. He aimed to make Earth's next prime species, that would stay behind and take over when either Human Order was over or humanity abandoned the planet.

=== Minor characters ===
Caubac Alcatraz (コーバック・アルカトラス, Kōbakku Arukatorasu)
Voiced by: Daisuke Kishio
Also known as "Dead Apostle of the Millennium Lock" (千年錠の死徒, Sennenjō no Shito) and the "Comedian of the Dead Apostles", Alcatraz is the 27th member of the Twenty-seven Dead Apostle Ancestors.
Cashura (カーシュラ, Kashūra)
Voiced by: Akihiro Mine (Japanese); Luis Bermudez (English)
Cashurais a magus who works for the US government. He tried to summon King Arthur for the False Holy Grail War, but was killed by Assassin, leaving the summoning incomplete. Richard I was summoned instead.
Kischur Zelretch Schweinorg (キシュア・ゼルレッチ・シュバインオーグ, Kishua Zerurecchi Shubain'ōgu)
Voiced by: Ikuya Sawaki (Japanese); Brook Chalmers (English)
Kischur is one of five living Magicians capable of True Magic beyond modern science or Magecraft.
Yuukaku Kuruoka (繰丘夕鶴, Kuruoka Yūkaku)
Voiced by: Yoshihisa Hosokawa
Yuukaku is Tsubaki's father who was intended to summon Qin Shi Huang as a Servant before being infected by Pale Rider.
Mrs. Kuruoka
Voiced by: Yoko Fujita
Mrs. Kuruoka is Tsubaki's mother.
Master of Archer
Voiced by: Wataru Tsuyuzaki (Japanese); Yong Yae (English)
The original Master of Archer in the False Holy Grail War of Fate/strange Fake before Tiné Chelc kills him to take over the contract.
Synthetic beast creator
Voiced by: Hironori Kondo
The creator of The Synthetic beast Silver Wolf.
Doris Lusendra (ドリス・ルセンドラ, Dorisu Rusendora)
Doris is a supportMagus contracted with Francesca Prelati to be the Master of True Rider. However, they could not contract her after she illegally crossed the border of the United States. She forfeited her right as Rider's Master and her Command Seals after losing a duel to Rin Tohsaka.
Van-Fem (ヴァン-フェム, Van-Femu)
Voiced by: Taiten Kusunoki (Japanese); Bill Butts (English)
The 14th member of the Twenty-seven Dead Apostle Ancestors, Van-Fem is nicknamed the Dark Lord of the Business World (財界の魔王, Zaikai no Maō). He is a "man of the world" who has an intense interest in human society despite being a vampire. Van-Fem holds a prominent position in public society under his real name, Valery Fernand Vandelstam (ヴァレリー・フェルナンド・ヴァンデルシュターム, Varerī Ferunando Vanderushutāmu).

== Media ==
=== Light novel ===
Published by Dengeki Bunko (Kadokawa/ASCII Media Works).

During its panel at New York Comic-Con 2026, Yen Press announced that it had licensed the series for English publication.

No.	Release date	ISBN
1	January 10, 2015	978-4-04-869168-0
2	May 9, 2015	978-4-04-865129-5
3	May 10, 2016	978-4-04-865763-1
4	April 8, 2017	978-4-04-892756-7
5	April 10, 2019	978-4-04-893519-7
6	January 10, 2020	978-4-04-912956-4
7	March 10, 2022	978-4-04-914283-9
8	February 10, 2023	978-4-04-914820-6
9	March 8, 2024	978-4-04-915448-1

=== Manga ===
Published by Type-Moon Books with sales by Media Pal.

No.	Release date	ISBN
1	January 14, 2016	978-4-04-730988-3
2	January 14, 2016	978-4-04-730989-0
3	August 23, 2017	978-4-04-730990-6
4	October 4, 2019	978-4-04-730991-3
5	February 10, 2022	978-4-04-730992-0

=== Anime ===
An official animated promotional video was released on December 31, 2019, it was animated by A-1 Pictures and uses the song "Belong" by Hiroyuki Sawano.

In September 2022, an anime television special adaptation was announced during the Aniplex Online Fest 2022 event. Titled Fate/Strange Fake: Whispers of Dawn, it is produced by A-1 Pictures and directed by Shun Enokido and Takahito Sakazume, with scripts written by Daisuke Ōhigashi, character designs by Yūkei Yamada, and music composed by Hiroyuki Sawano. It was licensed by Aniplex of America, and was originally set to air on December 31, 2022, during the annual Fate Project New Year's Eve TV Special, but was later delayed due to production issues. The film premiered on July 2, 2023, on Tokyo MX and BS11, following its world premiere in Los Angeles at Anime Expo. The theme song is "Fake It", performed by Hiroyuki Sawano.

During their panel at Anime Expo 2023, an anime television series adaptation was announced. The main staff members from the television film reprised their roles. The English-dubbed version of the first episode had its world premiere at the Fate 20th Anniversary Showcase event in Hollywood on November 23, 2024, and was released on YouTube on the same day. The Japanese-language version aired during the annual Fate Project New Year's Eve TV Special and was released on Crunchyroll on December 31. Later episodes starting from the second episode aired from January 10 to March 28, 2026, after being delayed from a 2025 premiere. The opening theme song is "Provant", performed by SawanoHiroyuki[nZk] featuring Jean-Ken Johnny of Man with a Mission and Takuma of 10-Feet, and the ending theme song is "Senzaiteki na Ai" (潜在的なアイ; lit. 'Potential Love'), performed by 13.3g. Aniplex of America has licensed the series for streaming on Crunchyroll.

A continuation was teased following the airing of the final episode. During a panel at Anime NYC 2026, it was announced that the series would receive a new season.

==== Episodes ====
No.	Title	Directed by	Written by	Chief animation directed by	Original release date
0	"Whispers of Dawn"	Shun Enokido and Takahito Sakazume	Daisuke Ōhigashi	Yūkei Yamada	July 2, 2023
Five years after the Fifth Holy Grail War, the Mage Association discovers rogue Mages orchestrating a Fake Holy Grail War in Snowfield, Nevada, led by Faldeus Dioland. While Lord El-Melloi II debates their response, his apprentice Flat Escardos heads to Snowfield without permission to witness the Grail. There, he summons Berserker-class Jack the Ripper. Meanwhile, Archer-class Gilgamesh is summoned and accepts young Native American Tiné Chelc as his Master after she slays his initial summoner, hoping to reclaim her tribe's ancestral lands. Tiné offers Gilgamesh the spare key to his Gate of Babylon, but he discards it, calling it useless. Assassin kills her summoner but becomes the focus of his twisted obsession after he revives himself. In a coma, a girl named Tsubaki Kuruoka summons a spirit-like Servant. Police chief Orlando Reeve, Master of Caster, equips his elite unit Clan Calatin with Noble Phantasm replicas. A deranged Mage's wolf familiar summons Lancer-class Enkidu, who defeats the intended Master. Faldeus later captures and executes him. Gilgamesh and Enkidu sense each other and clash to settle their ancient rivalry but postpone it to eliminate other Servants first. Their overwhelming power stuns all participants. Elsewhere, a concerned Mage seeks a solution to stop the war from ending the world, placing faith in an "Intruder". In Snowfield, an armored Servant asks a girl if she is his Master, but she refuses the role.
1	"The Heroic Spirit Incident"; Transliteration: "Eirei Jiken" (Japanese: 英霊事件)	Shun Enokido	Daisuke Ōhigashi	Yūkei Yamada	November 23, 2024 (online); December 31, 2024 (TV)
Ayaka Sajyou arrives in Snowfield before a military lockdown is enforced due to the chaos caused by Gilgamesh and Enkidu's battle. Seeking directions at a pharmacy, she recalls leaving Japan after a mysterious woman compelled her to come and is haunted by visions of a girl in a red hood. Faldeus places her under surveillance, noting the disappearance of Tsubaki's parents and a surge of diseased animals. Lord El-Melloi II and Langal theorize that the organization behind the war intends to mass-produce the Holy Grail. Meanwhile, Caster intimidates Orlando by revealing his knowledge of his secret dealings with Faldeus and Francesca Prelati. Ayaka is abducted to an opera house by a man hired by Francesca to summon King Arthur and test Arthur's loyalty through murder. Before he can perform the summoning, Assassin kills him. However, the ritual completes, summoning a Saber who is not King Arthur. Saber drives off Assassin with Excalibur and asks Ayaka if she is his Master. She refuses and both are arrested, but Saber publicly vows to atone for the destruction, ruining Faldeus' plans to conceal the war. Francesca revels in the chaos. Meanwhile, the Church sends priest Hansa Cervantes to oversee the war.
2	"Ensemble VS Pretense"; Transliteration: "Gunzō tai Kyozō" (Japanese: 群像 VS(たい) 虚像)	Takahito Sakazume	Daisuke Ōhigashi	Yūkei Yamada	January 10, 2026
The police interrogate Saber, who claims he is a follower of King Arthur. As an Einzbern homunculus enters Snowfield, Ayaka's interrogation reveals she is a seemingly normal girl and evidence that she had been hypnotized. Meanwhile, Gilgamesh spends time at a casino and advises Tiné to find her true desire before encountering Hansa. Back at the police station, Saber escapes the interrogation room and visits Ayaka in her cell, telling her that even if she says she is not his Master, there is a magical connection between them that is supplying him mana which keeps him from fading away, so their fates are linked. In the lobby, Hansa meets Orlando, who attempts to detain him to find out how much the Church knows about the Fake Holy Grail War. They are interrupted when Assassin breaks into the station and Clan Calatin attacks her. Saber breaks Ayaka out of her cell and they escape. During the battle, Assassin's Master enters the station, introducing himself as the Dead Apostle Jester Karture. Disgusted she is receiving mana from an inhuman creature, Assassin tries to attack Jester, but he uses a Command Spell to teleport her out of the city. Clan Calatin then attack him, but Jester is invulnerable to their Noble Phantasms due to being a Dead Apostle. However, before Jester can attack Orlando, Hansa decides to intervene.
3	"A Battle without Heroes"; Transliteration: "Eirei Naki Tatakai" (Japanese: 英霊なき戦い)	Directed by : Kazuho Kunimoto; Storyboarded by : Takahito Sakazume	Daisuke Ōhigashi	Kou Aine	January 17, 2026
Hansa, acting in his role as priest, battles Jester and gains the upper hand due to most of his body containing sanctified combat prosthetics made to kill undead beings. Realizing he is at a disadvantage, Jester takes the form of a child to escape. Orlando forcibly takes officer John Wingard off duty due to losing an arm to Jester, and Caster procures blades coated with Hydra venom. Ayaka and Saber escape into the city, and encounter a friend Ayaka made when she first arrived in Snowfield. In a restaurant, Flat converses with Jack the Ripper, who takes the form of a wristwatch, stating that he took a picture of Gilgamesh and sends it as well as other intelligence he has been able to gather to El-Melloi II. Receiving Flat's information, El-Melloi II is shocked to learn Gilgamesh is participating in the war, still traumatized from encountering him in the Fourth Holy Grail War. However, what truly concerns him is that Snowfield's magical leyline became active the moment Saber was summoned, suggesting that the Fake Holy Grail War is in fact a cover for a true Holy Grail War, meaning that the first six Servants summoned were just catalysts to summon seven more Servants for the true War. As Gilgamesh lectures Tiné about the value of doubting her own motives, a second Archer-class Servant fires an arrow at her. Meanwhile, Faldeus attempts to summon his own Servant. At first, he believes the ritual failed until he finds a note asking if he is the writer's Master.
4	"The Canon of Demigods"; Transliteration: "Hanshin-tachi no Tsuisōkyoku" (Japanese: 半神達の追走曲)	Directed by : Kazuki Kawagishi; Storyboarded by : Shun Enokido	Daisuke Ōhigashi	Yūkei Yamada & Kou Aine	January 24, 2026
Caster remarks that in order to create a true Holy Grail in the United States, Faldeus and his backers planted a piece of the Fuyuki Holy Grail in Snowfield, and summoned six "False" Servants to serve as primers for seven "True" Servants. It is revealed that Faldeus had summoned True Assassin. Meanwhile, Orlando protests to Francesca about the recklessness of the Masters she has chosen for the Holy Grail War before being interrupted by True Archer's arrow. Gilgamesh blocks the arrow and attacks True Archer, who proves to be an equal match for him. However, their battle is suddenly interrupted by the arrival of True Rider, who attacks True Archer out of outrage for him attacking a child (Tiné). A three way battle then rages between them until Francesca's Servant, True Caster, interrupts them with an illusion spell. True Archer then reveals his True Name as Alcides, while True Rider likewise identifies herself as Hippolyta. All of the combatants then withdraw to fight another day. Elsewhere, Ayaka and Saber take shelter in a local nightclub where Saber puts on modern clothing and performs with a guitar. Saber reveals that he has no specific wish for the Grail, other than to present it to King Arthur's grave. He also reveals one of his Noble Phantasms is the ability to call his past companions to assist them, before revealing his True Name as Richard the Lionheart.
5	"Stars' Banquet"; Transliteration: "Sutā Pafōmā "Shin'uchi"-tachi no Utage" (Japanese: スターパフォーマー《真打ち》達の宴)	Directed by : Takahiro Ōkawa & Masayuki Sakoi; Storyboarded by : Takahiro Ōkawa	Ami Satō	Yurie Hama	January 31, 2026
Francesca and Faldeus recruited a stoic, child soldier codenamed Sigma due to curiosity on what a person with no desires would summon. Sigma summons an invisible and intangible flying whale creature that communicates using Shadows of historical figures which only he can see and hear, who proclaim the Servant as Watcher and claim that Sigma himself will become True Lancer after a series of "trials". Meanwhile, the mob boss Bazdilot Cordelion summoned Heracles as True Archer. When Heracles refused to harm children, Bazdilot used all three Command Spells and the cursed Black Mud of the Fuyuki Holy Grail to convert him into Alcides, who has no such restraint and wishes to destroy everything the gods had built. Bazdilot reveals he powers his Servant with the corpses of over 24,976 people. Tsubaki, in a dream world, asks her Servant Mr. Black to stop the people from leaving as a disease spreads through the local wildlife. Flat detects the city is surrounded by magical fog. Francesca reveals to Faldeus that she had been killed and resurrected countless times and claims to wish to make everyone capable of performing True Magic. True Caster is her past self, François Prelati. False Assassin attacks Sigma, but he evades her thanks to advice from the Shadows. Outside his mansion hideout, he finds Ayaka and tells her to run. False Assassin tries to strike him, but Richard blocks the blow.
6	"The Wandering King's Rock 'n' Roll"; Transliteration: "Samayoeru Ō no Rokku 'n' Rōru" (Japanese: 彷徨える王のロックンロール)	Directed by : Hirotaka Mori & Shun Miyakawa; Storyboarded by : Shun Miyakawa	Dai Masuyama	Yūkei Yamada	February 7, 2026
Faldeus notices the mysterious plague continues to spread throughout Snowfield, now infecting humans and giving them a compulsion to stay in the city. Meanwhile, False Caster deduces Saber's identity as Richard and what his true Noble Phantasm is. At the Clock Tower, El-Melloi II receives information that Richard's Master resembles Ayaka, who was one of his students, and he attempts to contact her. Outside the city, Richard and Ayaka meet with Enkidu to propose an alliance. Enkidu is open to one, but first wants to test Richard's strength in a sparring match. Both Servants battle each other, and Richard reveals his true Noble Phantasm: being able to turn anything he holds into Excalibur. Enkidu is impressed and agrees to ally with Richard. Ayaka feels guilty for abandoning the red hooded girl to be killed by her abusive parents and tells Richard to leave her, but he refuses. False Assassin arrives and agrees to pause hostilities so they can eliminate Jester first. Enkidu requests that they also team up to lift the strange curse that has fallen over Snowfield. While Enkidu guards his wolf Master, False Assassin leads Richard and Ayaka to an abandoned mansion where they encounter Sigma, and Richard convinces False Assassin to spare him. Ayaka passes out from the stress and dreams of Richard encountering the mysterious Saint Germain in the past, though Saint Germain is apparently aware of Ayaka's presence. Upon waking up, she agrees that she and Richard need to work together better as a pair. Back in the city, Gilgamesh advises Tiné she needs to show more self esteem if she wants to be taken seriously as a Master. The hospital is now overloaded with patients suffering from the plague. Jack the Ripper scouts the hospital and confirms it's the source of the plague and the black fog Flat is sensing. Jester is also in the hospital, keeping watch over Tsubaki's body.
7	"Back from Twilight, the God Is Come"; Transliteration: "Kami wa Tasogare Yori Maimodori" (Japanese: 神は黄昏より舞い戻り)	Masakazu Obara	Asako Kuboyama	Yūkei Yamada & Masaaki Takiyama	February 14, 2026
Haruri Borzak, who wants revenge on Magus society for the deaths of her parents, summons a monster as True Berserker, but it injures her and goes on a rampage. The Einzbern homunculus, Fillia, heals her and forces True Berserker to obey her. Sigma reports what happened to Faldeus, lying that he summoned Charlie Chaplin as True Lancer, then introduces himself to Richard and Ayaka. Bazdilot dreams of Alcides' past as an Argonaut and mocks Jason as a fool. As Alcides says Jason was his best friend, Fillia and Haruri assault their base. Alcides is enraged when Fillia reveals she is being possessed by a goddess and attacks her, but she can fight on his level. Bazdilot converts the base into a hellzone filled with monsters and attacks Haruri, but True Berserker defends her and she orders it to destroy the base. Richard invites Sigma to join their alliance and Ayaka offers to be False Assassin's new Master. Francesca is amazed by True Berserker, but sends François to stop the fight. Bazdilot shoots Haruri in the arm and orders her to make her Servant commit suicide, but François uses his illusion powers to make a bottomless pit and force everyone to withdraw. Jester enters Tsubaki's dream world and introduces himself. When a Shadow tells Sigma that Faldeus sent troops to the mansion, he decides to join the alliance and tells Richard, Ayaka, and False Assassin the secrets of this Grail War.
8	"Backstage of a Third-rate Comedy"; Transliteration: "San-ryū Kigeki no Butaiura" (Japanese: 三流喜劇の舞台裏)	Ryo Nakano	Daisuke Ōhigashi	Masaaki Takiyama	February 21, 2026
A flashback shows Flat had to fake a smile when his parents disowned him until Lord El-Melloi II took him in. False Caster gives John Wingard an artificial arm and questions his resolve before empowering him with a spell. Flat and Jack infiltrate the police station with Jack impersonating Orlando's secretary Vera Levitt and revealing he can multiply himself until they corner Orlando and warn him that Tsubaki's Servant is causing the plague. Flat calls El-Melloi II to make a plan. While Sigma's alliance is wary of the troops outside, False Assassin questions his faith. Sigma says he does not believe in God because of his wretched life, so she wishes for him to find something good to place his faith in. Orlando and Vera and the Shadows explain how Tsubaki's parents experimented on her until she went into a coma. Bazdilot tells Alcides to kill Tsubaki. Flat and the police make a plan to extract Tsubaki from the hospital and ask Hansa to harbor her once they do. Faldeus asks True Assassin to assassinate a particular person. Sigma is unsure saving Tsubaki is the right move, especially after the Shadows warn him there is a mole in Clan Calatin, but he tells his group that Jester is in the hospital. Flat tells Jack he is only helping Tsubaki because that is what El-Melloi II would do, and Jack decides to go along with the plan. The police surround the hospital but are shocked when Alcides approaches riding on Cerberus.
9	"The Nightmare Comes with the Dawn of London"; Transliteration: "Akumu wa Rondon no Akatsuki to Tomoni" (Japanese: 悪夢は倫敦(ロンドン)の暁と共に)	Directed by : Yoshiyuki Kumeda; Storyboarded by : Mamoru Kurosawa	Ami Satō	Kou Aine	February 28, 2026
Alcides attempts to destroy the hospital, but Jack and Jester intervene, with Jack using his clones to distract Cerberus while Jester blocks Alcides' arrows. Jack then uses his Noble Phantasm "From Hell" to make the environment look like Hell and transform into a demon to defeat Cerberus and fight Alcides, but they are interrupted when Gilgamesh arrives and attacks everyone indiscriminately. Richard arrives and agrees to duel Gilgamesh while Jack handles Alcides. Jester is angered when he realizes False Assassin has a new mana source. Meanwhile, Sigma takes Ayaka to the safety of the church before heading for the hospital with False Assassin. He asks why False Assassin wants to save a child who is a total stranger to her, and she replies that helping children is part of her faith, and if she had the power, she would have tried to save Sigma as well. Sigma realizes that he had been subconsciously wishing for someone to save him from being a child soldier. Back at the hospital, Gilgamesh realizes Richard made an alliance with Enkidu and decides to go all out, while Richard accepts his "declaration of war" and steals one of Gilgamesh's swords. Jack combines From Hell with his second Noble Phantasm, "Natural Born Killers", his cloning ability, and nearly defeats Alcides, only for him to activate his own Noble Phantasm, "Reincarnation Pandora", and steal From Hell from Jack. With Jack incapacitated, Alcides proceeds to the hospital. John tries to stand in his way, but Alcides knocks him into a building, seemingly killing him.
10	"Gold and Lion"; Transliteration: "Kogane to Shishi" (Japanese: 黄金と獅子)	Shōtarō Kitamura	Asako Kuboyama	Yūkei Yamada	March 7, 2026
Orlando orders his officers to retreat, but Alcides uses From Hell to become a demon and sends them flying. Richard uses Excalibur several times against Gilgamesh, causing Hansa to ask what Ayaka is because despite having no knowledge of magecraft, she can supply an unnatural amount of mana to Richard. Sigma and False Assassin try to enter the hospital, but Jester attacks them out of jealousy, mistakenly believing they are a couple. Flat uses a Command Spell to teleport Jack to him, then False Caster approaches, introducing himself as Alexandre Dumas, and offers to empower them with his Noble Phantasm "Musketeers' Masquerade". Flat and Jack attack Alcides together, with Flat using his second Command Spell to make Alcides' demon parts, which are technically part of Jack, explode. Dumas revives John who stabs Alcides with a hydra venom dagger, but Alcides uses the Black Mud to power up and survive the venom. Gilgamesh injures Richard and knocks him through the church's roof. Seeing Gilgamesh makes Ayaka have flashbacks of seeing him and Kirei Kotomine before. As Gilgamesh prepares to kill him, Richard asks him to spare Ayaka's life. Alcides suddenly attacks Gilgamesh with the Noble Phantasm "Nine Lives", which fires a rain of hydra venom arrows. Fillia suddenly uses the discarded key to the Gate of Babylon to nullify Gilgamesh's Noble Phantasm, causing him to get hit by three arrows, though Enkidu intervenes from afar to protect him from a fatal fourth arrow. Gilgamesh realizes Fillia is possessed by his archenemy, the goddess Ishtar. Jester suddenly causes a black fog to spread. Alcides, Ishtar, and True Berserker retreat after True Berserker gives a parting shot that punches a hole in Gilgamesh's chest, making Tiné scream in horror. The fog spreads over Sigma, False Assassin, Flat, Jack, the officers, Richard, and Ayaka, who was trying to pull Richard to safety.
11	"The Pale Knight"; Transliteration: "Aoi Zameta Kishi" (Japanese: 蒼ざめた騎士)	Ryōji Masuyama	Dai Masuyama	Kou Aine	March 14, 2026
Sigma and False Assassin wake up and are greeted by Tsubaki, her parents, and Mr. Black, a sentient cloud of miasma. Sigma cannot contact Watcher and they can tell her parents are in a trance. Ayaka dreams of Richard's past where he confided his insecurities to his mother. She wakes up to a healed Richard in an intact church, then the officers arrive and offer an alliance, as they are trapped in a pocket dimension that resembles the real world. In the real world, Enkidu and the wolf meet Tiné, who retrieved Gilgamesh and spent two Command Spells trying to heal him. Enkidu says to accept his death, but relents and offers help. Dumas, who barely escaped the fog, tells Orlando that his officers are still alive and he still has plans for them. Ishtar explains to Haruri that she long ago put a curse that would summon her if Gilgamesh and Enkidu ever reunited. Richard asks the officers if they would willingly kill Tsubaki to escape the pocket dimension. When they balk, he calls them worthy to be knights and offers to do it. Ayaka briefly hallucinates the red hooded girl before telling Richard not to be a murderer, so he relents and agrees to save Tsubaki. They are suddenly attacked by Cerberus. Tsubaki is suddenly contacted telepathically by a being claiming to be a god. Flat, Jack, Hansa, and Hansa's assistants wander the pocket dimension until they conduct a ritual to boost Flat's cellphone, letting him contact El-Melloi II. El-Melloi II tells them the real Ayaka Sajyou is in Romania right now, so the one in Snowfield must be an imposter.
12	"At the End of the Rope"; Transliteration: "Tōhi no Hate" (Japanese: 逃避の果て)	Directed by : Ryo Nakano & Yoshiyuki Kumeda; Storyboarded by : Takuya Asaoka	Daisuke Ōhigashi	Masaaki Takiyama & Yurie Hama	March 21, 2026
Sigma questions Tsubaki's father Yukaku, who explains that they are in a dream world ruled by Mr. Black. When Sigma says Tsubaki is in danger, Mr. Black summons Cerberus. Richard and the officers battle it until Richard points out it should have no quarrel with them because they are alive and not in the Underworld. Cerberus actually listens until Mr. Black takes control of it and summons duplicates of it. False Assassin finds Flat's group and agrees to work with them to escape, but Jester appears and boasts escape is impossible unless they kill Tsubaki. Yakaku brags about infecting Tsubaki with magical bacteria to boost her power. Tsubaki and Sigma meet the mysterious Jiao, whom before fading away, directs Sigma to the God-Felling Crossbow and charges him to protect Tsubaki. Jester appears and asks Tsubaki for her wish. When she wishes to become a mage, Mr. Black makes the sky turn black and the streets overrun with vermin as he reveals his identity, the Fourth Horseman of the Apocalypse, the Pale Rider. Continuing to battle Cerberi, Richard is knocked into a building. Ayaka runs to him, overcoming her fear of the red hooded girl, and declares from now on, they will fight together. However, Richard admits he cannot fight at his full power because he hasn't found a reason to desire the Holy Grail. A Cerberus attacks them, but Francesca and François appear and placate it with cookies.
13	"This Illusion Becomes Reality"; Transliteration: "Mugen wa Gen Tonarite" (Japanese: 夢幻は現となりて)	Directed by : Hirotaka Mori; Storyboarded by : Shun Enokido & Takahito Sakazume	Daisuke Ōhigashi	Yūkei Yamada, Kou Aine, & Yurie Hama	March 28, 2026
Francesca and François placate the other Cerberi with cookies, then show Richard and Ayaka an illusion of King Arthur's journey in Fate/Zero ending with the Great Fuyuki Fire. They expected Richard to be disillusioned by learning Arthur was a girl and flawed, but he instead thanks them for showing them another side of his idol, then redoes his first meeting with Ayaka where she accepts being his Master. Jester tries to turn False Assassin against the others by claiming they will kill Tsubaki, but Hansa and Flat use his true name, Dorothea, in a spell to weaken him. Flat explains he called the master Dead Apostle Van-Fem, who disowns Jester and gives Flat his blessing to kill him. Pale Rider summons giant skeletons as Jester escapes and declares his wish to kill all humans except for False Assassin. Richard battles the skeletons and declares his wish to sing praises for King Arthur she can hear in Avalon. Tsubaki and Sigma see the skeletons smashing buildings while her parents say the people are expendable. Realizing this is where the path of magecraft leads, Tsubaki spends two Command Spells to ask Pale Rider to change things back to normal and isolate herself forever. Everyone wakes up in the real world while Tsubaki goes back to her coma. As False Assassin pursues Jester, Tsubaki's parents uncaringly discuss cutting off her hand to get her Command Spells and control over Pale Rider, making Sigma lose his temper and shoot them. Flat meets Ayaka and can tell she is not human, but he is suddenly killed by snipers on Faldeus' orders, making Ayaka and Jack scream in horror. Suddenly, something starts killing the snipers and cuts off Faldeus' cameras. Van-Fem toasts Flat's ancestor, stating how his plans will reach fruition with Flat's death. Watcher's Shadows ask Sigma what he will do now, and realizing his mother also fought and died in a Holy Grail War, he declares he will destroy the Holy Grail War itself.
