= Siege of Cherbourg (1450) =

Siege of Hundred Years War

- Part of the Hundred Years' War
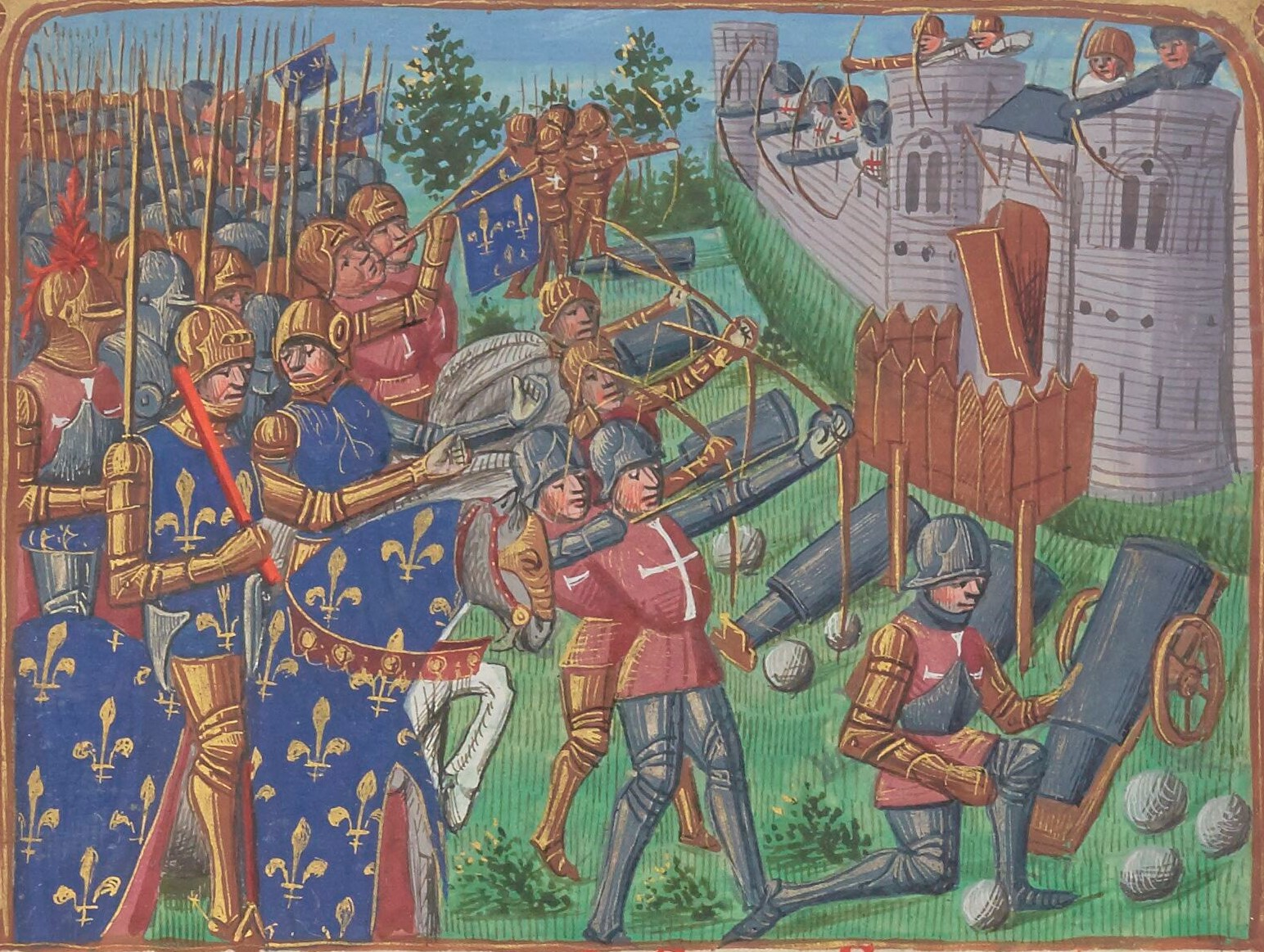
- Siege of Cherbourg, miniature from the Vigiles du roi Charles VII by Martial d'Auvergne, c. 1484
Date	6 July – 12 August 1450
Location	Cherbourg, Normandy
Result	French victory. Cherbourg surrenders

Belligerents
Kingdom of England	Kingdom of France

Commanders and leaders
Thomas Gower (surrendered)	Arthur de Richemont; Jean Bureau; Prigent de Coëtivy †

The siege of Cherbourg took place in 1450 during the Hundred Years' War when French forces laid siege to Cherbourg in the English-controlled Duchy of Normandy following their decisive victory at the Battle of Formigny. With the fall of Cherbourg, English control of Normandy was removed.
