= Prigent VII de Coëtivy =

15th century Breton noble

Prigent VII de Coëtivy (1399 – 20 July 1450), seigneur de Coëtivy, baron de Retz and seigneur de Machecoul, was a Breton nobleman. He was in the service of the French crown and was killed at the siege of Cherbourg in 1450.

== Biography ==
He was the son of Alain III de Coëtivy (c. 1370-1425), commander of the troops of Arthur III, Duke of Brittany, and of Catherine du Chastel, sister of Tanneguy du Châtel. He was a brother of Cardinal Alain de Coëtivy.
He married in 1442 Marie de Rais (c. 1433-1457), daughter of Gilles de Rais. They had no children.

He fought in the third and final phase of the Hundred Years' War against the English.
In 1439, King Charles VII of France appointed him Admiral of France.

He disguished himself during the Siege of Le Mans in 1447, but was killed in the successful Siege of Cherbourg (1450).
