= Crouzet =

Crouzet may refer to:

== People with the surname ==
- Denis Crouzet (born 1953), French historian
- Elisabeth Crouzet-Pavan (born 1953), French historian
- François Crouzet (1922–2010), French historian
- Marguerite Crouzet, French mistress of Georges Boulanger
- Michèle Crouzet, French politician
- Philippe Crouzet (born 1956), French businessman

== Places ==
- Crouzet-Migette, Bourgogne-Franche-Comté, France
- Le Crouzet, Bourgogne-Franche-Comté, France

== See also ==
- Crouzet Automatismes, an automation components company acquired by Schneider Electric
