= Castellania =

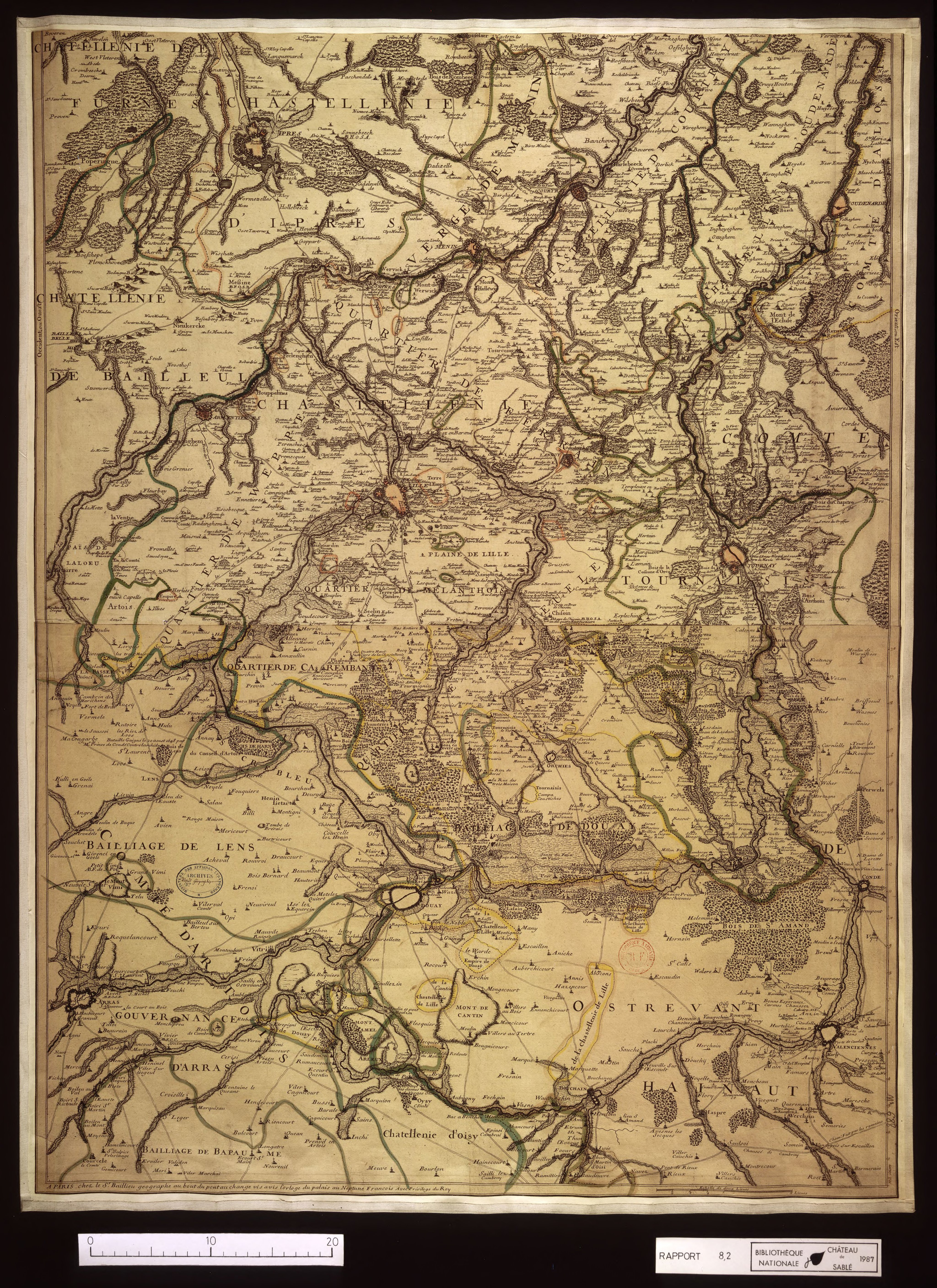
1707 map of the castellania of Lille, established in 1039.

A castellania was the smallest administrative subdivision of land in medieval Malta, Poland, Hungary and the Netherlands, signifying the territory over which the master of a castle exercised his ordinary rights. At its centre was the castle, the most important place in the castellania, administered by a castellan (castellanus in Latin). In south-eastern France from the 11th century onwards such a subdivision was called a castellania, a châtellenie or a mandement (from the Latin mandamentum) and covered the administrative, military and financial functions of a territory held, exploited from and protected by a castle.

== Origins ==
In France the term mandement or châtellenie were used for a new territory which gathered around a motte and bailey castle built by a member of the rural aristocracy after the failure of central power. They appeared very early on in the north of what is now the Drôme département, more specifically in the Romanais, which during that period was overrun by around twelve motte and bailey castles, including eight outside the ancient Carolingians districts.

Over time the mandement became an admninistrative district in its own right and a name for an area. In the Romanais each mandement was of a reduced size and covered only two or three parishes - the largest, that of Peyrins, was made up of six parishes, the equivalent of four communes today.

== Feudal unit of the old royal domain ==
The castellan was an officer appointed and paid by a count or prince. He could be dismissed or moved to head another castellania. His main function was as guardian of the castle and regularly having to present its accounts. He was also delegated to exercise all of the count or prince's judicial and military rights. By extension and by tort, any owner of a castle (whether received, taken over as a fiefdom or raised on his allod) over which a lord exercised his rights was also called a castellan.

== Bibliography ==
- (in French) Claude Gauvard, Alain de Libera, Michel Zink, Dictionnaire du Moyen Âge, PUF, 2002, p. 280.
- (in French) Jean Merley, « Le Velay dans la première partie du xviiie siècle : les mandements vellaves et l’enquête de 1734 sur la capitation », Cahiers de la Haute-Loire, Le Puy-en-Velay, 1965
- (in French) Didier Catarina, « Les mandements du Velay : essai de géographie (illustré d'une carte) », Cahiers de la Haute-Loire, Le Puy-en-Velay, 2000.
