= Henry Aron =

French journalist (1842–1885)

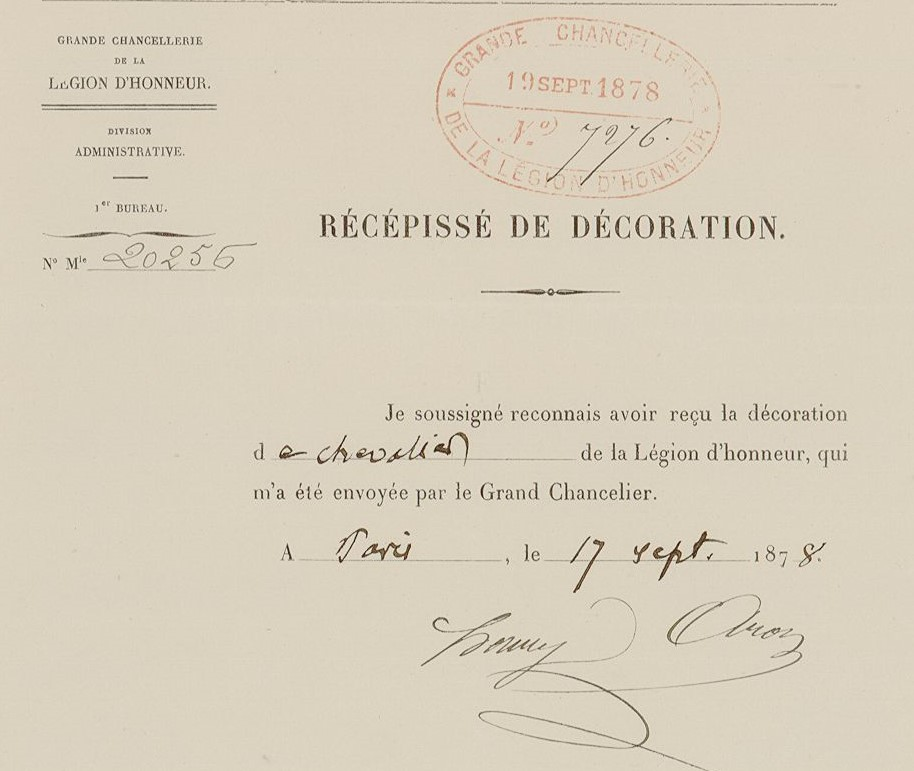
- Aron's signature on his acceptance of the Legion of Honor in 1878
- Born: Henri Aron; 11 November 1842; Besançon, France
- Died: 13 November 1885 (aged 43); Paris, France
- Education: Lycée Charlemagne; École Normale Supérieure
- Occupation: Journalist

Henry Aron (11 November 1842 – 13 November 1885) was a French journalist and political essayist. He wrote for several prominent Parisian journals and was director of the Journal officiel de la République française from 1876 until 1881. He also served in the government of Léon Gambetta, France's 45th Prime Minister. Aron was born in Besançon and died in Paris at the age of 43. He was awarded the Legion of Honor in 1878.

== Life and career ==
Aron, the maternal uncle of the historian Henri Hauser, was born in Besançon to a middle-class Jewish family of republican sympathies. His father, Charles Aron, was a merchant and exporter. Aron began his education at the Lycée Charlemagne in Paris. He went on to the École Normale Supérieure and obtained a fellowship there in 1865, but gave up teaching to pursue a career in journalism, initially writing for the Journal des Débats and the Revue politique et littéraire. He later became the secretary of the Revue des Deux Mondes.

On the suggestion of Ernest Picard, France's Interior Minister in the early days of the French Third Republic, he was appointed director of the Journal officiel de la République française in 1876. He left his post on the resignation of the government in May 1877 but resumed it in October upon the reelection of a Republican majority. The following year he was decorated with the Legion of Honor for his service to the journal. Aron became one of the founding council members of the Société des Études Juives in 1880. He resigned his post at the Journal officiel in 1881 when it came under state control and then served in the government of Léon Gambetta as Director of Political Affairs in the Ministry of Foreign Affairs from 1881 to 1882. Afterwards, he returned to the Journal des Débats as its literature and theatre critic, but his deteriorating health eventually forced him to retire.

Aron figured several times in the antisemitic tracts of Édouard Drumont, his old classmate at Lycée Charlemagne, who deeply resented Aron's success. In La France juive in which Drumont attacked the role of Jews in French society and argued for their exclusion, he accused Aron of firing him from a minor position at the Journal officiel because he was a Christian. Drumont later wrote in La Libre Parole, five years after Aron's death:

I had been a student at the Lycée Charlemagne, where I was a classmate of the Jew Aron, who was undoubtedly a Jew, since he was already director of the Journal officiel and holder of the Legion of Honour, while I was still struggling to earn a living.

Henry Aron died of tuberculosis in Paris at the age of 43 and was buried in Montparnasse Cemetery on 15 November 1885. His funeral was conducted by the Chief Rabbi of Paris, Zadoc Kahn, with the eulogy given by Tony Baugier, the director of the Journal officiel at the time.

Aron had married Pauline Veil-Picard, the daughter of a wealthy banker in Besançon, on 26 May 1879. The couple had one daughter, Germaine-Jeanne Aron de Faucompré, who was only a year old when her father died. She was later adopted by Pauline's third husband, Xavier-Gustave-Édouard, comte de Faucompré. Germaine-Jeanne married the aristocrat Armand de Rafelis de Saint-Sauveur in 1905. According to Proust, their marriage announcements in Le Figaro were the inspiration for the marriage of the characters Gilberte Swann and Robert de Saint-Loup in his novel À la recherche du temps perdu. (Note: Gilberte Swann's transformation into Mlle. Gilberte de Forcheville is recounted in Volume 6 of the novel. Like Germaine-Jeanne Aron, the Gilberte character was the daughter of a Jew, Charles Swann. After his death she adopted the name of her step-father, Le comte de Forcheville, and consequently secured a marriage to the patrician Robert de Saint-Loup. In the announcement of Germaine-Jeanne's engagement to Armand de Saint-Sauveur in Le Figaro of 16 October 1905 she was referred to as "Mlle. Germaine-Jeanne Aron de Fàucompré". However in subsequent articles about the impending marriage and the one on the wedding itself, she was referred to only as "Mlle. Germaine-Jeanne de Fàucompré".)
