= Lycée Charlemagne =

Coordinates: 48°51′14″N 2°21′36″E

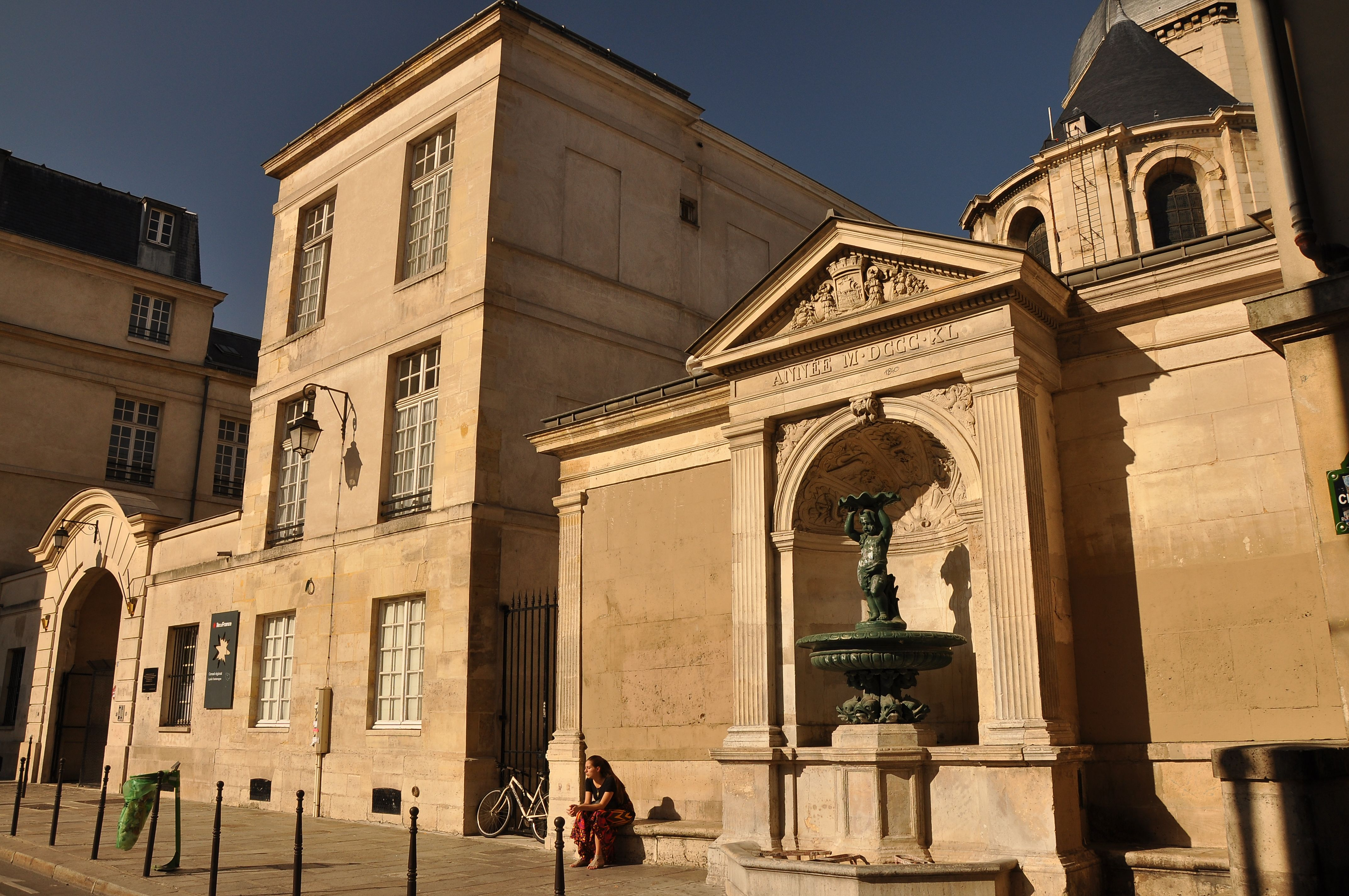
- 14 rue Charlemagne; 75004 Paris; France

Information
- Type: Public
- Established: 1804; 222 years ago
- School district: Le Marais
- Principal: Jean-Luc Guéret

The Lycée Charlemagne (French pronunciation: [lise ʃaʁləmaɲ]) is located in the Marais quarter of the 4th arrondissement of Paris, the capital city of France.

Constructed many centuries before it became a lycée, the building originally served as the home of the Order of the Jesuits. The lycée itself was founded by Napoléon Bonaparte and celebrated its bicentennial in 2004.

The lycée is directly connected to the Collège Charlemagne (formerly known as le petit lycée) which is located directly across from it, on the Rue Charlemagne.

Also the lycée offers two-year courses preparing students for entry to the Grandes écoles, divided into seven classes:

- three first-year classes:
  - two of mathematics, physics, and engineering science
  - one of physics, chemistry, and engineering science
- four second-year classes:
  - two of mathematics and physics
  - two of physics and chemistry.

== History ==
The school is associated with Charlemagne Middle School that is located just opposite it, on Rue Charlemagne, and is alongside the walls of Philippe Auguste, of which only the exterior cladding still exists.

In 1580, The Cardinal de Bourbon bought the Duchess of Montmorency's Hotel of Rochepot and Damville. He gave it to the Jesuits, who demolished the main building located along the Rue Saint Antoine and replaced it with a chapel dedicated to St. Louis, in 1582.

Between 1627 and 1647, the Jesuits built a building destined to become their home on the grounds of Philippe-Auguste. This home became one of the most famous of the order. It is the home of the confessors of Kings, whose father La Chaise confessors of Louis XIV with Father Michel Le Tellier and renowned preachers such as Bourdaloue or Ménestrier and Father Pierre Cotton, which was that of Henri IV and Louis XIII.

From 1762 to 1767, the buildings were deserted after the expulsion of the Society of Jesus under the ministry of the Duke of Choiseul.

On 23 May 1767 the Génovéfains of Sainte-Catherine-du-Val-des-Écoliers bought the House of the Jesuits for 400,000 pounds; the regular canons of the reform of Saint Genevieve left their priory of Saint Catherine of Couture (that fell into ruins) and occupied the ancient Jesuit novitiate, which they called Royal Priory of St. Louis of Couture (or culture).

They rented the large library gallery to the city of Paris. It was established from 1773 until the year 1790, the public library in the city of Paris.

At the French Revolution, the Constituent Assembly having suppressed the monastic orders, on 17 March 1795 (27 Ventose Year III) an order of the management board put the library of the Commune at the disposal of the National Institute of Sciences and Arts, who plundered the bottom (20-30 000 books).

In 1797, the former Professed House of the Jesuits became the Central School of the Saint-Antoine Street. Under the Empire, Joseph Lakanal accepted the chair of ancient languages at the Central School of the Saint-Antoine Street.

The Law of 11 Floreal (1 May 1802) rechristened the central school of Saint-Antoine street, which became the Lycee Charlemagne.

The imperial decree of 24 Brumaire year XIII showed the willingness to install the high school near the Place des Vosges, in the house of Minimes; but the decree of 21 March 1812 confirmed its presence and authorised the expansion of the high school that receives then four hundred residents (external).

In 1815, it was rechristened, and became the College Royal de Charlemagne.

== Chapel ==
The chapel of St. Louis, in 1582, was replaced by the present church in 1627. King Louis XIII laid the first stone, and it was known as the Saint-Louis des Jesuits. The church was designed by two Jesuit architects, Étienne Martellange and François Derand. The first mass was celebrated on 9 May 1641 by Cardinal Richelieu, benefactor of the church in 1634, to whom he offered the beautiful oak doors carved with the initials of the Society of Jesus. Bourdaloue made her debut in 1669 and there, pronounced the funeral oration of the Grand Condé in 1687. Bossuet and Fléchier also preached. In the original chapel, was baptized in 1626 Marie-Chantal of Rabutin, the future Ms. de Sevigne.

== Structure ==
The school welcomes seven second classes, a first and last L, a first and last ES, 1st five and six terminal S. The current headmaster is Pierrette Floc'h, succeeding Alberto Munoz in 2011.

In 2024, Lycée Charlemagne stands out as one of the top educational institutions in France, ranking 1st in Paris and 2nd nationally according to Le Parisien. This ranking highlights several factors: an exceptional graduation rate, a high percentage of students earning honors (Sufficient, Good, or Very Good), and an excellent rate of progression from the 10th grade to the baccalaureate. Additionally, the school shows remarkable added value (calculated from the social background of students, their age and their results at national certificate), reflecting the effectiveness of its teaching and support in improving student performance compared to initial expectations. Le Figaro ranks Lycée Charlemagne 7th nationally and 6th in Paris, based on graduation and honors rates for the general baccalaureate in 2023 and the school’s support of students from the 10th grade to graduation. These rankings are based on data provided by the Ministry of National Education and Youth, confirming the institution’s quality and effectiveness.

It also hosts preparatory classes for schools, namely two classes of MPSI, a class of HPIC for the first year, an MP, and a PC for the second year.

In 2015, L'Étudiant gave the following ranking for competitions in 2014:

Course	Students Admitted in school^{*}	Admission Rate^{*}	Average Rate Over 5 Years	National Ranking	Change Over 1 Year
Mathematics, physics (MP)	17 / 93 Students	18%	23%	21st of 114	▼9
Physics, chemistry (PC)	7 / 75 Students	9%	9%	26th of 110	▲2
Source : Classement 2015 des prépas - L'Étudiant (Concours de 2014). * the rate of admission depends on the schools selected for the study In science courses it is a group of 11 to 17 schools that were selected by the student according to the course (MP, PC, PSI, PT or BCPST).

== Notable alumni ==
- Claude Allègre, geochemist and politician
- Mathieu Amalric, actor and director
- Jean-Charles Alphand (1817–1891), engineer of roads and bridges
- Henry Aron (1842–1885), journalist
- Henry-Clément Sanson, executioner
- Xavier Aubryet, writer
- Honoré de Balzac, (1799–1850), novelist
- Gérard Baste, singer and TV presenter
- Adrien Berbrugger, archaeologist
- Maurice Berteaux, minister of war, killed by an airplane
- Francis Blanche, actor
- Louis Auguste Blanqui, republican
- Léon Blum, politician
- Louis Bourdon, mathematician
- Nicolas Léonard Sadi Carnot, physicist
- Jean Cassou, poet, resistant
- Ernest Cauvin, politician
- Maurice Cocagnac, Dominican
- Fustel de Coulanges, historian
- Victor Cousin, philosopher
- Louis Delluc, director
- Dante Desarthe, director
- Pierre Dezarnaulds (1879–1975), politician
- Gustave Doré, painter and illustrator
- Claude Érignac, prefect
- Jean-Pierre Frimbois, journalist
- Théophile Gautier, poet and novelist
- Arthur H, singer
- Jacques Hadamard (1865–1963), mathematician
- François-Victor Hugo, third son of Victor Hugo, translator of Shakespeare
- Joseph Joffre, Marshal of France
- Lionel Jospin, politician
- Jean-Daniel Jurgensen, resistant, diplomat
- Guy Lardreau, philosopher
- Jules Lagneau, philosopher
- Alexandre Ledru-Rollin, lawyer, politician
- Claude Lemaitre-Basset, politician
- Pierre Leroux, inventor of the word "socialism"
- François Léotard, politician
- Philippe Léotard, comedian
- Auguste Maquet, writer, collaborator of Alexandre Dumas
- Léon Moussinac, film critic, resistant, director of the IDHEC
- Pierre Messmer, politician
- Maurice Meuleau, writer, historian, professor and researcher at the CNRS
- Jules Michelet, writer
- Robi Morder (1954-), labor lawyer and political scientist, specialist of high school students and student movements
- Gérard de Nerval, writer
- F'Murrr (Richard Peyzaret), cartoonist
- Jean Richepin, de l'Académie française, poet and writer
- Raymond Radiguet, writer
- Jules Renard, writer
- Adrien Barthélemy Louis Henri Rieunier, Admiral AP and Minister of Marine (1893)
- Gérard Rinaldi, actor and singer
- Pierre Rosenberg, art critic, director at the Louvre, academician
- Jean Sablon (1906–1994), Mireille interpreter
- Charles Augustin Sainte-Beuve, literary critic, writer
- Auguste Vacquerie, poet, photographer and journalist, half brother of Léopoldine Hugo
- Félix de Vandenesse, master of requests of Louis XVIII
- Manuel Valls, politician
- Pierre Wantzel (1814–1848), mathematician who proved that ancient geometric problems of doubling the cube and trisecting the angle were impossible to solve using only compass and straightedge
- Count Władysław Zamoyski, landowner, ecologist and philanthropist

== Former teachers ==
- Auguste Angellier (1848-1911), anglicist, literary critic
- Jean Bayet (1882-1969), a Latin scholar, member of the Académie des Inscriptions et Belles-Lettres
- Louis Benaerts (1868-1941), historian
- Elie Bloncourt (1896-1978), MP, member of the High Court
- Jean-Louis Burnouf (1775-1844), a Latin scholar, member of the Académie des Inscriptions et Belles-Lettres
- Félicien Challaye
- Eugène Charles Catalan (1814-1894), mathematician
- Eugène Chevreul (1786-1889), chemist
- Paul Couderc (1899-1981), astronomer
- Fabié François (1846-1928), Aveyron poet
- Louis-Benjamin Francoeur (1773-1849), mathematician, member of the Academy of Sciences
- Louis Gallouédec (1864-1937), Inspector General, Chairman of the General Council of Loiret
- Pierre George (1909-2006), geographer, member of the Academy of Moral and Political Sciences
- Rodolphe Guilland (1888-1981), historian, Byzantinist
- Alexandre Langlois (1788-1854), Indian scholar, translator of the Rig-veda, member of the Académie des Inscriptions et Belles-Lettres
- Gustave Lanson (1857-1934), critic and literary historian
- Théodore Lefebvre (1889-1943), geographer, resistant, beheaded in the prison of Wolfenbüttel
- Édouard Lucas (1842-1891), mathematician
- Robert Mandrou (1921-1984) historian and professor at the EHESS and the University of Paris X.
- Gustave Rivet (1848-1936), parliamentarian and Dauphiné poet
- Eugène Rouché (1832-1910), mathematician
- Amédée Thalamas (1867-1953), geographer, MP for Seine-et-Oise

== See also ==
- List of Jesuit sites
