= Jean Merley =

French historian (1927–2017)

Jean Merley (6 October 1927 – 17 February 2017) was a French historian and professor at the Université de Saint-Étienne, which he cofounded. He also founded the Centre de recherches historiques and became director of the Centre interdisciplinaire d'études et de recherche sur les structures régionales.

== Life ==
He was born at Saint-Étienne into a local family of gunsmiths and cannon-founders, first evidenced in the mid 15th century. He taught history at lycées in Roanne, Clermont-Ferrand and finally Le Puy-en-Velay, editing and defending a doctoral thesis in history entitled The Haute-Loire from the end of the Ancien régime to the start of the Third Republic (1776-1886)

He was made assistant in history at Lyon University, then seconded to the Collège littéraire universitaire de Saint-Étienne, before becoming maître de conférences at the université de Saint-Étienne from 1970 to 1977, as well as taking part in the latter university's foundation in 1969. In January 1977 he was made titular professor of modern and contemporary history, a post he held until 1996. He founded the Centre de recherches historiques and in 1974 was made director of the Centre interdisciplinaire d’études et de recherche sur les structures régionales. He was also publishing director of Cahiers de la Haute-Loire. He died at Saint-Priest-en-Jarez.

== Works ==
- La Haute-Loire, de la fin de l'Ancien régime aux débuts de la troisième République, thèse de Lettres. Lyon II. 1973, Cahiers de la Haute-Loire, 625 p.
- Forez mémoire, préface de Maurice de Meaux, ill. Philippe Malot, Saint-Étienne, 1996, Édi Loire, 126 p.
- Histoire des eaux minérales de Saint-Galmier, Saint-Étienne, 1983, Centre interdisciplinaire d'études et de recherche sur les structures régionales, 381 p. (co-authored with Jacqueline Bayon-Tollet)
- L'industrie en Haute-Loire de la fin de la Monarchie de Juillet aux débuts de la Troisième République, preface by Pierre Léon, Lyon 1972, Centre d'histoire économique et sociale de la région lyonnaise, Centre Pierre Léon, 451 p.
- Saint-Bonnet-le-Château : de l'Ancien régime à la Belle époque, Saint-Étienne, 1979, Université de Saint-Étienne, 133 p. (co-authored with Jean-Paul Bourgier)
- La Verrerie B.S.N. de Veauche, histoire d'une entreprise forézienne, Saint-Étienne, 183, Centre interdisciplinaire d'études et de recherches sur les structures régionales, 292 p. (co-authored with Monique Luirard)
- Histoire de Saint-Etienne (ed.), Privat, Collection Univers de la France, 1995, 318 p.
- Une source capitale de l'histoire urbaine au XVIII et au XIX siècles : la documentation fiscale in Images et pratiques de la ville (vers 1500-vers 1840) Numéro 1 de Cahiers de l'IERP, Institut des Etudes Régionales et des Patrimoines Saint-Etienne.

=== Articles in Cahiers de la Haute-Loire ===
- Le Velay dans la première partie du XVIIIe siècle. Les mandements vellaves et l’enquête de 1734 sur la capitation (1965), available at Gallica
- La contribution de la Haute-Loire à la formation de la population stéphanoise au milieu du XIXe siècle (1966)available at Gallica
- Le rapport du Préfet Lamothe sur la situation en Haute-Loire au début du Consulat (1968) available at Gallica
- Les revenus de l’Hôtel-Dieu et de l’Hôpital Général du Puy à la fin du XVIIIe siècle (1970) available at Gallica
- Le mémoire Chèvremont sur la situation de la Haute-Loire au début du Second Empire (1971) available at Gallica
- Le Monastier à la fin du XVIIIe siècle (1973) available at Gallica
- Langeac au milieu du XVIIIe siècle (1975) available at Gallica
- Misère et fausse-monnaie en Velay à la fin du règne de Louis XIV (1977) available at Gallica
- Brioude à la fin de l’Ancien Régime. Activités et aspects sociaux (2009)
