= Prix Guizot =

French academy award

The Prix Guizot is an annual prize of the Académie française, which has been awarded in the field of history since 1994 by Fondations Guizot, Chodron de Courcel, Yvan Loiseau and Eugène Piccard.

It is awarded to the author of a work of general history.

== Laureates ==
Source: Académie française

- 1995
  - Jean-Pierre Valognes, Vie et mort des chrétiens d'Orient, des origines à nos jours (Fayard)
- 1996
  - Barbara de Negroni, Lectures interdites. Le travail des censeurs au XVIIIe siècle (Albin Michel)
  - Alain Boureau, Le Droit de cuissage. La fabrication d'un mythe (Albin Michel)
- 1997
  - Michel-Edmond Richard, Notables protestants, en France, dans la première moitié du XIXe siècle (Lys)
  - Serge de Robiano, Échec à l'Empereur, échec au Roi. Maurice de Broglie, évêque de Gand (1766-1821) (Quorum)
  - Youri Roubinski, La Russie à Paris (Éditions du Mécène)
  - Paul Butel, Histoire de l'Atlantique, de l'Antiquité à nos jours (Perrin)
- 1998
  - François Caron, Histoire des chemins de fer en France (Fayard)
  - Pierre Pouchain, Les Maîtres du Nord (Perrin)
- 1999
  - Claude Fohlen, Histoire de l'esclavage aux États-Unis (Perrin)
- 2000
  - Alain Gérard, Par principe d'humanité...la Terreur et la Vendée (Fayard)
  - Jacques Jourquin, Dictionnaire des maréchaux du Premier Empire
- 2001
  - Francis Rapp, Le Saint Empire romain germanique, d'Otton le Grand à Charles Quint (Tallandier)
  - François Crouzet, Histoire de l’Économie européenne (Albin Michel)
- 2002
  - Jean Ayanian, Le Kemp, une enfance intra muros (Parenthèses)
  - Victor Debuchy, La vie à Paris sous la Commune (Christian)
  - Elisabeth Crouzet-Pavan, Enfers et Paradis. L'Italie de Dante et de Giotto (Albin Michel)
  - Jean Mathiex, Civilisations impériales (Félin)
- 2003
  - Jean-Marc Moriceau, Terres mouvantes. Les campagnes françaises du féodalisme à la mondialisation, XIX-XXe siècle (Fayard)
  - Jean Verdon, Boire au Moyen Age (Perrin)
  - Reynald Abad, Le Grand Marché. L’approvisionnement alimentaire de Paris sous l’Ancien Régime (Fayard)
- 2004
  - Jean-Pierre Rioux, Au bonheur la France (Perrin)
- 2005
  - Janine Garrisson, L'Affaire Calas : miroir des passions françaises (Fayard)
- 2006
  - Marc Boyer, Le Thermalisme dans le Grand Sud-Est de la France (Presses universitaires de Grenoble)
  - Olivier Chaline, Le Règne de Louis XIV (Flammarion)
  - Véronique Larcade, Les Cadets de Gascogne. Une histoire turbulente (Sud-Ouest)
- 2007
  - André Chervel, Histoire de l'enseignement du français du XVIIe au XXe siècle (Retz)
  - Dominique Iogna-Prat, La Maison Dieu. Une histoire monumentale de l'Église au Moyen Age (Seuil)
  - Charles Frostin, Les Pontchartrain ministres de Louis XIV. Alliances et réseau d'influence sous l'Ancien Régime (Presses universitaires de Rennes)
- 2008
  - Lucien Jaume, Tocqueville : les sources aristocratiques de la liberté (Fayard)
  - Marie-Claude Blais, La Solidarité. Histoire d'une idée (Gallimard)
  - Edina Bozoky, La Politique des reliques de Constantin à Saint Louis (Beauchesne)
  - Jean-Marc Berlière, Liquider les traîtres. La face cachée du PCF (1941-1943) (Robert Laffont)
  - Esther Benbassa, La Souffrance comme identité (Fayard)
- 2009
  - Stella Ghervas, Réinventer la tradition. Alexandre Stourdza et l'Europe de la Sainte-Alliance (Honoré Champion)
  - Jacques Le Rider, L'Allemagne au temps du réalisme. De l'espoir au désenchantement (1848–1890) (Albin Michel)
  - Grégoire Kauffmann, Édouard Drumont (Perrin)
  - Charles Wright, Casanova ou l'essence des Lumières (B. Giovanangeli), ISBN 275870031X
  - Alain Monod, Vauban ou la mauvaise conscience du roi (Riveneuve)
- 2010
  - Catherine Horel, Cette Europe qu’on dit centrale. Des Habsbourg à l’intégration européenne 1815-2004 (Beauchesne)
  - David Bitterling, L’Invention du pré carré. Construction de l’espace français sous l’Ancien Régime (Albin Michel)
  - Jacques-Alain de Sédouy, Le Concert européen. Aux origines de l’Europe 1814-1914 (Fayard)
  - Alain Cabantous, Histoire de la nuit XVIIe-XVIIIe siècle (Fayard)
  - Nathan Wachtel, La Logique des bûchers (Seuil)
- 2011
  - Frank Attar, Aux armes, citoyens ! naissance et fonctions du bellicisme révolutionnaire (Seuil)
  - Charles-Edouard Levillain, Vaincre Louis XIV : Angleterre - Hollande - France, histoire d'une relation triangulaire 1665-1688 (Champ Vallon)
- 2012
  - André Burguière, Le Mariage et l’Amour en France, de la Renaissance à la Révolution (Seuil)
  - Ivan Jablonka, Histoire des grands-parents que je n’ai pas eus. Une enquête (Seuil)
- 2013
  - Thierry Lentz, Napoléon diplomate (CNRS éditions)
  - Alain Testart, Avant l’histoire : l’évolution des sociétés, de Lascaux à Carnac

== See also ==
- List of history awards
- List of awards named after people
