= Denis Crouzet =

French historian

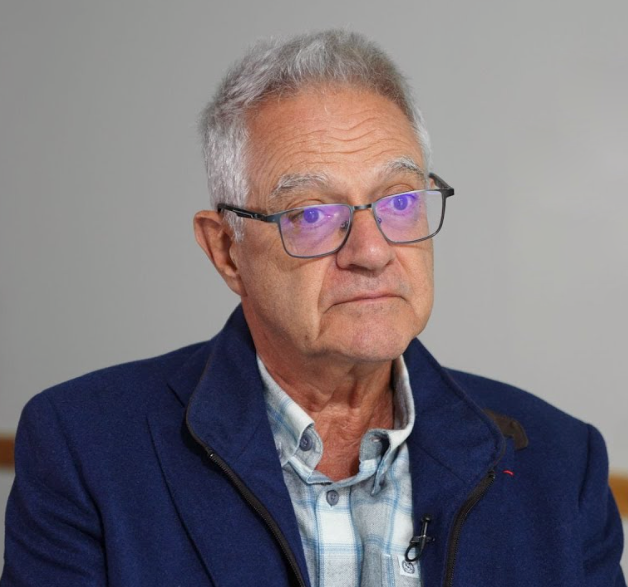
- In a 2024 interview
- Born: Denis Bertrand Yves Crouzet; 10 March 1953 (age 73); Paris, France
- Education: Paris-Sorbonne University
- Occupation: Historian
- Spouse: Elisabeth Crouzet-Pavan
- Father: François Crouzet

Denis Bertrand Yves Crouzet (born 10 March 1953) is a French historian specialising in the history of the early modern period and particularly in the French Wars of Religion during the reformation. He is a professor at Paris-Sorbonne University where he holds the chair in History of the 16th Century. He is married to the historian Elisabeth Crouzet-Pavan.

== Life ==
Crouzet was born in Paris into a family of historians. He is the great-grandson of the economic historian Henry Hauser; the grandson of Maurice Crouzet who served as the Inspector General for History under France's Ministry of National Education; and the son of François Crouzet, a specialist in British history who was also a professor at the Sorbonne.

Crouzet received his doctorate in 1989 from the Sorbonne. His doctoral dissertation, La violence au temps des troubles de religion (vers 1525- vers 1610), was supervised by Pierre Chaunu. After receiving his doctorate he was appointed professor of modern history at the University of Lyon–Jean Moulin in 1989 and in 1994 was appointed to the chair of 16th-century history at the Sorbonne. Since 2006 he has also served as the director of the Sorbonne's Centre Roland Mousnier for the study of early modern history and its Institut de recherches sur les civilisations de l'Occident moderne.

In 2008 Crouzet was awarded the Madeleine Laurain-Portemer prize by the Académie des Sciences Morales et Politiques for the body of his work. He was elected a Fellow of the British Academy in 2011 and in 2014 was made a Chevalier of the Légion d'honneur.
