= Venetian Interdict =

1605–1607 diplomatic conflict

The pamphlet Nuova risposta defended the Venetian interdict.

The Venetian Interdict of 1606 and 1607 was the expression in terms of canon law, by means of a papal interdict, of a diplomatic quarrel and confrontation between the Papal Curia and the Republic of Venice, taking place in the period from 1605 to 1607. While it was active, the Interdict saw expulsions of some religious orders from Venice, a pamphlet war, and intense diplomacy by France and Spain to resolve the issue. Paolo Sarpi was one of the most prominent Venetian figures involved in the interdict. Leading defenders of the legitimacy of the interdict were the Jesuits Robert Bellarmine and Antonio Possevino.

== Background ==
There had been previous interdicts laid on Venice. In 1202 the Venetian siege of Zadar during the Fourth Crusade led Pope Innocent III to excommunicate the army. In 1284, Pope Martin IV imposed an interdict because of Venice's refusal to support a crusade against the Crown of Aragon. Pope Clement V addressed escalating measures against Venice after the 1308 capture of Ferrara; and later in the War of Ferrara of the 1480s Pope Sixtus IV laid an interdict on Venice, an erstwhile ally. In 1509 Pope Julius II placed Venice under interdict, during the War of the League of Cambrai, to further the papal cause in warfare in the Romagna.

== Course of events ==
In 1605 Venice took measures to counter a papal attack on the way the Republic exerted control over its Catholic clergy. Pope Paul V treated Venice's approach to civil jurisdiction over clerics and church property as anti-clerical; Leonardo Donato, an opponent of papal power, was elected Doge early in 1606.

Based on the case current at the time of two arrested clerics, the Pope issued an interdict against Venice in April 1606. In diplomatic moves, Philip III of Spain encouraged the Papacy to press its case; while Henry IV of France supported Venice.

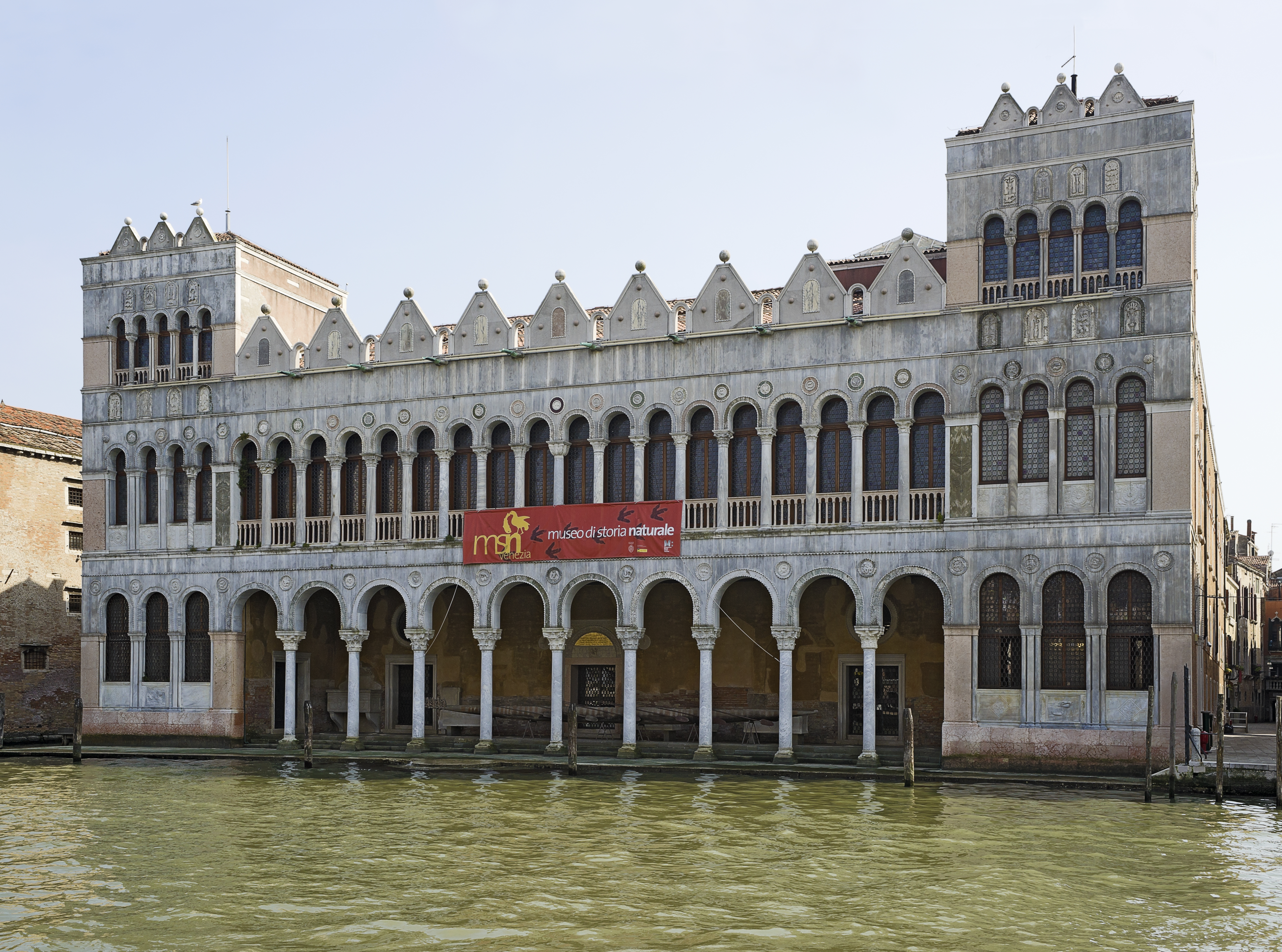
The Fondaco dei Turchi in Venice, having diplomatic lodgings in the upper part in the 17th century.

=== Military buildup ===
The estimate in Rome was that the forces required to prosecute the conflict militarily were 50,000 infantry with 4,000 cavalry; beyond the papal pocket. Philip III ordered Pedro Henriquez de Acevedo, Count of Fuentes in Milan to readiness, with the required cavalry and about half the infantry. Paul V called in Alfonso d'Avalos, a Spanish colonel based in Milan, to oversee, and Alessandro Monti from Flanders to command, his forces. Henry IV started to raise troops; he was able to match the Spanish forces well enough, and had Philippe Canaye propose to the Venetian Senate a plan of encouraging the Grisons to invade the Milan province.

=== La Guerra Delle Scritture ===
La guerra delle scritture (The War of Writings) was a phenomenon that was directly tied to the Interdict Controversy. It was a pamphlet war which involved intellectuals on both sides of the conflict. Among the opposers of the legitimacy of the Interdict were Paolo Sarpi, Giovanni Marsilio, Antonio Querini, and Marcantonio Capello. Their adversaries, the defenders of the Interdict, were Robert Bellarmine, Antonio Possevino, and Cesare Baronio. Possevino, for instance, wrote one pamphlet addressing Giovanni Marsilio, the Nuova Risposta di Giovanni Filoteo d'Asti di un Theologo incognito scritta ad un sacerdote suo amico, sopra le censure, & interdetto di Papa Paolo V, contro la Signoria di Venetia (Bologna & Ferrara: 1606). Two pamphlets, however, address Antonio Querini: the Risposta di Teodoro Eugenio di Famagosta all'avviso mandato fuori dal Signore Antonio Querino Senatore Veneto, circa le ragioni, che hanno mosso la Santità di Paolo V. Pontefice à publicare l'Interdetto sopra tutto il Dominio Vinitiano, and the Risposta del Sig. Paolo Anafesto all'avviso del Sig. Antonio Querino, Nobili Venetiani, circa la scommunica della santità di Papa Paolo V contro il Duce, & Senato di Venetia. These texts, along with other pamphlets, give witness of the harshness of the rhetoric during the Interdict controversy.

=== Resolution ===
War threatened, but the French were not clearly prepared to fight over the matter, as the Spanish were. As this became apparent, Henry's diplomacy was able to resolve the immediately contentious matters. His objective all along was to play the peacemaker and gain influence in Italy, this approach being at odds in the end with Canaye's pro-Venetian posture. Canaye moved to press the Venetians to accept mediation by Cardinal François de Joyeuse. The interdict was lifted and formal reconciliation occurred in April 1607, with de Joyeuse as cardinal legate taking custody of the two priests at the centre of the dispute in his accommodation in the upper loggia at the Fondaco dei Turchi on the 21st.

The interdict, however, had prompted a ban from the territories of the Venetian Republic of the Jesuits, and it continued until 1656/7. It ended as part with the reconciliation of another period of disputes between the Republic and the Papacy.

== Evaluations ==
Bouwsma states that, while the outcome was satisfactory to Venice, this event also marks the beginning of the decline of the Republic. John A. Marino writes that the polemical exchanges on theories of statehood, by their intellectual depth, were influential for future discussions well into the 17th century. Mazetti Petersson notes that the topics of the pamphlets spread during the Interdict controversy were at times repetitions of medieval debates on church politics, authority, and the role of history brought forward by the competing traditions of papalism and conciliarism.

This was the last example of a papal interdict applied to an extended region, though interdicts have been used subsequently on a local scale.
