= Jean-Marc Berlière =

French historian

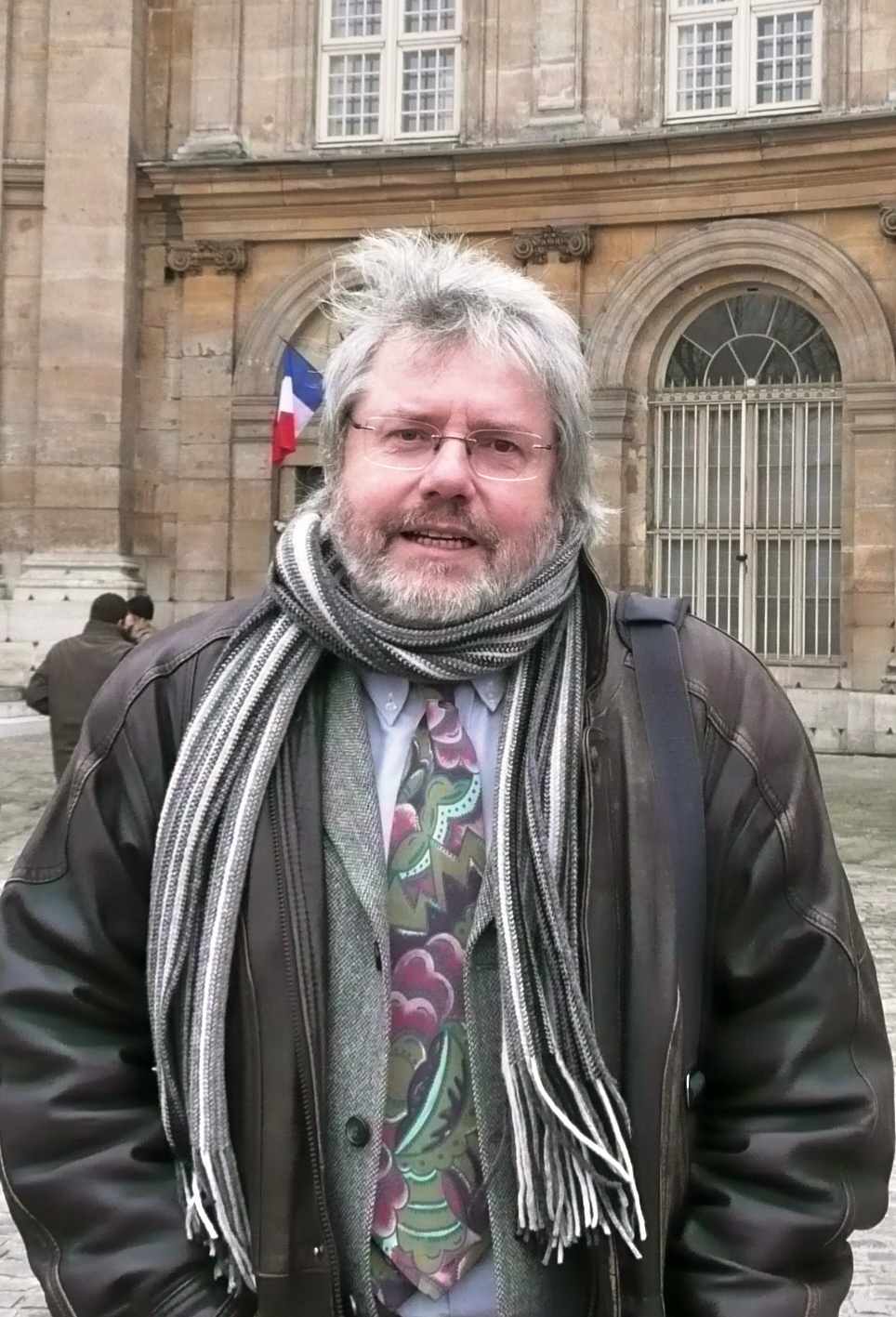
JM Berlière

Jean-Marc Berlière is a French historian who specialises in the history of the French police. He works as a professor at the University of Burgundy. In 1991, he completed a Doctoral thesis on the Police of the French Third Republic.

Besides having written a number of history books, Berlière has also participated in many television documentaries. He was an historical expert on Who Do You Think You Are? where he helped explain to Davina McCall the role her grandfather played in the Dreyfus Affair.

== Biography ==
Born in Dijon in 1948, Jean-Marc Berlière was a secondary school teacher before defending his Doctorate thesis in 1991 on L'Institution et la société policières sous la IIIe République (1870-1914).

In parallel with his research activities leading to publications, Jean-Marc Berlière was a lecturer at the Grenoble Institute of Political Studies, then professor of contemporary history at the University of Burgundy (now emeritus). His research activities were conducted, among others, within the CESDIP (CNRS/Ministry of Justice).

He was awarded the bronze medal of the Prix Guizot in 2008 with his co-author Franck Liaigre for Liquider les tratres. La face cachée du PCF (1941-1943) and made Ordre des Arts et des Lettres in 2012.
