= Henri Hauser =

French academic (1866–1946)

- Born: 19 July 1866; Oran, French Algeria
- Died: 27 May 1946 (aged 79); Montpellier, France
- Education: École Normale Supérieure; University of Paris
- Occupation: Historian

Henri Hauser (19 July 1866 – 27 May 1946) was a French historian, geographer, and economist. A pioneer in the study of the economic history of the early modern period, he also wrote on contemporary economic issues and held the first chair in economic history to be established at a French university.

He was born in Oran into a middle-class Jewish family who had moved to French Algeria for health reasons but returned to France when Hauser was four years old. Hauser was educated at the Lycée Condorcet in Paris and then at the École Normale Supérieure where he came first in both the entrance and leaving examinations. He initially taught in provincial lycées before taking his doctorate in 1892 with a thesis on the 16th-century Huguenot leader, François de la Noue. Hauser went on to become a professor of ancient and medieval history at the University of Clermont-Ferrand, modern history and geography at the University of Dijon, and finally a professor of history and economic history at the Sorbonne from 1919 to 1936. His 1905 book L'impérialisme américain predicted the decline of Europe and the dominance of the United States, while his 1915 Méthodes allemandes d'expansion économique analyzed the role played by German industry in the outbreak of World War I. Hauser was awarded the Legion of Honor in 1919 and in 1945 the Académie française awarded him the Prix de l'Académie for his life's work.

== Biography ==
=== Early life and education ===
Hauser was born into a Jewish family of republican sympathies. His father Auguste Hauser (1816–1884) had been a Freemason and was a tailor by trade. His mother, Zélia Hauser née Aron (1840–1879), was the daughter of a prosperous merchant and exporter in Besançon. Although both of Hauser's parents were born in Besançon, their families' origins were in Luemschwiller in the Alsace region. Henri and his elder brother Félix-Paul were born in Oran in French Algeria where the family had relocated to improve Zélia's health and where Auguste had a tailor shop. The family returned to France when Henri was four years old, on the eve of the Franco-Prussian War. After a short stay in Marseille, they settled in Seine-Saint-Denis near Paris where Auguste resumed his trade as a tailor. Hauser's mother Zélia died of tuberculosis when he was thirteen. His maternal uncle, Henry Aron, then looked after the education of Henri and Félix-Paul. He enrolled Henri in the Lycée Condorcet to prepare him for eventual study at the École Normale Supérieure.

Hauser entered the École Normale Supérieure in August 1885. One of his mentors there was the geographer Paul Vidal de la Blache who would be a lifelong influence on him. Upon his graduation from the École in 1888 when he came first in the Agrégation examinations for history and geography, Hauser received a teaching appointment at the lycée in Bourges. He subsequently taught at the lycées of Pau and Poitiers before receiving his doctorate in 1892 from the Faculté des lettres de Paris (University of France). His doctoral dissertation, supervised by Gabriel Monod, was on the 16th-century Huguenot leader, François de la Noue. It was published by Hachette that same year and reviewed by Jean Réville in the Revue de l'histoire des religions. Réville noted the dissertation's erudition and the new light shed on de la Noue's reputation by Hauser's study.

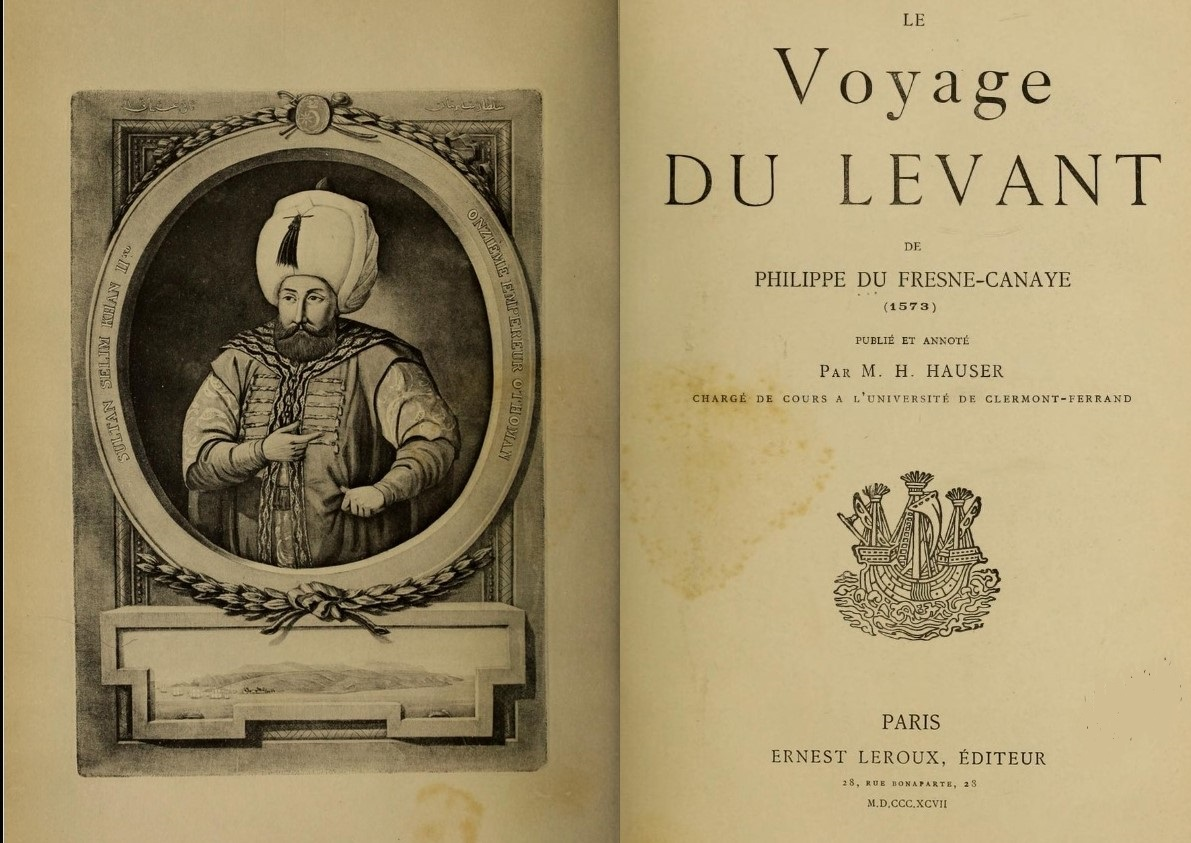
Title page of Hauser's extensively annotated translation of Voyage du Levant which shed new light on the life of Philippe du Fresne-Canaye

=== Academic career ===
Hauser's first university appointment was as a lecturer (chargé de cours) in ancient and medieval history at the University of Clermont-Ferrand in 1893. There he published several studies which continued to shed new light on the religious and economic history of the 16th century, including Voyage du Levant. Hauser had discovered Philippe Canaye's hitherto unpublished account of his 1573 voyage to Constantinople in the Bibliothèque nationale de France. He translated the Italian manuscript and published it in 1897 with extensive notes and a biography of Canaye which corrected many errors in previous accounts of his life. Hauser was promoted to Professor of History at Clermont-Ferrand in 1896 and remained at the university until 1899 when the Dreyfus Affair made his position untenable. During that year he established a section of the Ligue des droits de l'homme at Clermont-Ferrand and gave a series of public lectures attacking the conviction of Dreyfus for treason as "illegal". Hauser wrote, "I want a France great and noble, a France faithful to its mission of justice and truth." Antisemitic students at the university and the right-wing press attacked him as a "traitor" and a "Prussian".

Hauser took a leave of absence from Clermont-Ferrand, moved back to Paris with his wife Thérèse and their young daughter Alice and threw himself into writing teaching manuals for geography and comparative studies on the teaching of geography and economics in the French colonies. One of his more eclectic works from this period was his 1901 L'Or, a book on gold in all its aspects including its extraction, metallurgy, the regions in which it is mined, and its use in both industry and commerce. The following year it was awarded the Prix Montyon. In 1901, Hauser was offered an appointment to the University of Dijon and taught there until 1919 as Professor of Modern History. He also taught commercial and industrial geography at the Conservatoire National des Arts et Métiers from 1915 to 1933, first as a lecturer and then as a professor. In 1919 he received his first appointment to the University of Paris. He began there as a lecturer in modern economic history, was promoted to professor sans chaire (Note: Professeur sans chaire was an academic category created by the French government in 1920 and no longer in existence. It was given to a senior academic in an institution for which there existed no specific chair for the subject.) in 1921, and in 1927 was given the university's first chair in economic history.

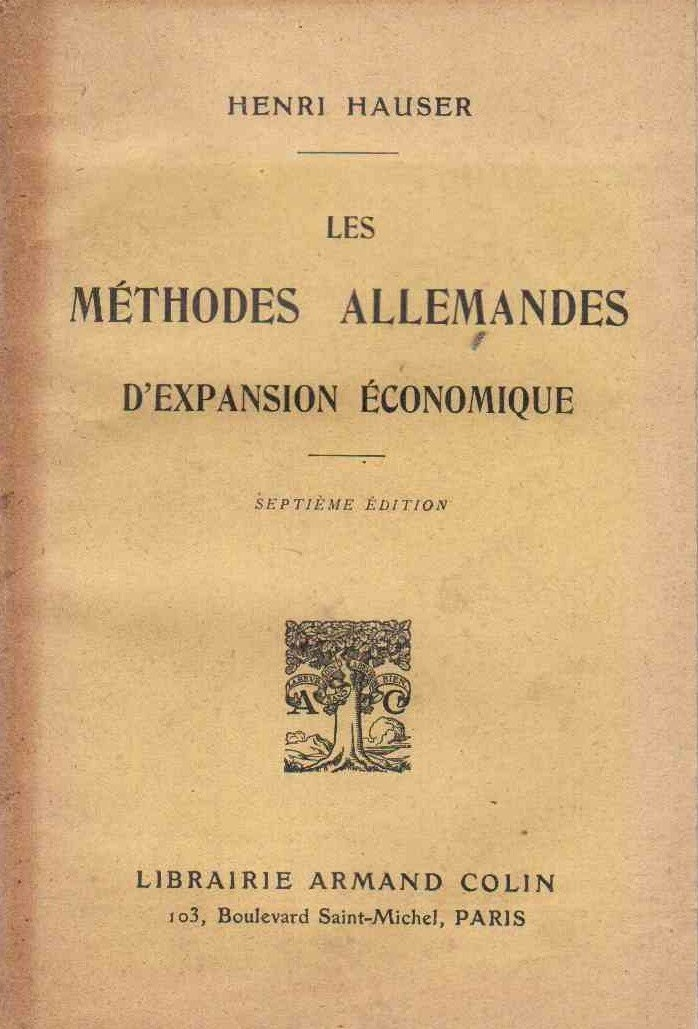
7th edition of Hauser's influential Méthodes allemandes d'expansion économique, first published in 1915 and later in English as Germany's Commercial Grip on the World

According to cultural historian Pim den Boer, Hauser was "exceptionally knowledgeable about a wide range of subjects" which was reflected in his scholarship. Throughout his career Hauser's approach was a multidisciplinary one and emphasized the roles played by both economics and geography in historical scholarship, views expressed as early as his 1903 L'enseignement des sciences sociales and his influential 1906 essay "La Géographie humaine et l'histoire économique". He also co-authored two books on the geography of France and its colonies with Joseph Fèvre: Régions et pays de France (1909) and Notre Empire colonial (1910). During World War I Hauser worked as an advisor to Étienne Clémentel, France's Minister of Commerce and later sat on the economic committee at the Paris Peace Conference in 1919.

Henri Hauser and Henri Hitier co-directed a major inquiry into French manufacturing in 1915–16 for the National Association of Economic Expansion. The inquiry was supervised by Paul de Rousiers. Hauser's Méthodes allemandes d'expansion économique in which he analyzed the role played by German industry in the outbreak of the war had been published in 1915. The book was translated into English by Manfred Emanuel and Hauser and was published in London in 1917 and New York in 1918 as Germany's Commercial Grip on the World. The American edition came out as Germany's defeat seemed imminent and the allied powers were contemplating the terms of an eventual peace treaty. In his preface to that edition James Laurence Laughlin wrote:

I know of no other available authority who has so fully and so intelligently explained the methods by which Germany has gained her remarkable position in the markets of the world. [...] This volume is as necessary to us as to the French.

After World War I ended, Hauser returned to his primary specialty, the history of the early modern period, but continued to publish on many contemporary historical, economic and geographical subjects. According to den Boer, one of Hauser's finest historical works from this period was his 1933 La prépondérance espagnole (1559–1660) which he characterised as "rightly considered a masterly and original synthesis." It echoes the view of Augustin Renaudet in a paper read at a meeting of the Société d'Histoire Moderne shortly after Hauser's death. La prépondérance espagnole had multiple editions and was reprinted in 1973 with an introduction and eulogy to Hauser by Pierre Chaunu.

In the interwar period Hauser had an increasingly international presence. Between 1918 and 1920, he regularly visited Alfred Zimmern in Oxford University and Zimmern was also frequently in Paris to work on the post-war diplomatic conditions. In 1923, Hauser was invited by Edwin F. Gay to be an exchange professor at Harvard University where he taught an economics course and gave various lectures both at the university and in other American cities. In 1929 he was invited to give conferences and lectures at King's College London and the London School of Economics where he became one of the founder members of the International scientific committee on price history led by William Beveridge. Georges Dumas, an old friend from Hauser's student days at the École Normale invited him to Brazil in the 1930s to advise on the training of historians. Hauser was instrumental in bringing other French academics to teach in Brazilian universities. At his encouragement, Pierre Monbeig focused his doctoral dissertation on the first settlements in Brazil. Hauser was also a pillar of the Alliance Française. He and his brother Félix-Paul had become members in the late 1880s, only a few years after its founding. He was appointed to its administrative council in 1912, contributed numerous articles on French historical figures to its publications, and was elected its vice president in 1933.

=== Later years ===
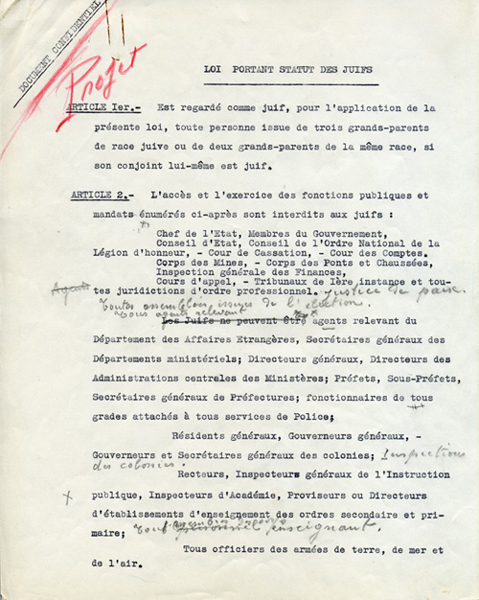
Draft of the Law on the status of Jews annotated by Philippe Pétain

Hauser retired from the University of Paris in 1936 at the age of 70 with Marc Bloch succeeding him in the chair of economic history, but he continued his scholarly work and publication in the ensuing years. Amongst the works he produced after his retirement was La naissance du Protestantisme which won the 1941 Prix Eugène Carrière of the Académie française. The lives of both men were seriously impacted by the outbreak of World War II. Hauser came out of retirement and moved with his family to Rennes in 1939 to cover a teaching post at the university left vacant when its lecturer was drafted. Bloch left his position at the Sorbonne that same year to join the French Army.

After France's defeat by the Germans in June 1940, Bloch returned to Paris, but when the Vichy laws on the status of Jews were passed in October of that year, both he and Hauser were declared "undesirable professors". Bloch joined the French resistance in 1942 and was later imprisoned by the Gestapo and executed. Hauser remained in Rennes, now forced to wear the yellow badge, and unable to teach. While there he learned that his apartment in Paris which contained his library had been completely pillaged as had his country house in Herblay. Nevertheless, he continued to publish articles in journals such as Revue Historique, although his name and those of the other Jewish scholars were replaced with their initials. He also began working on his memoires.

In June 1942 Hauser was warned that his name was on a list of persons to be arrested the following day. (Note: Hauser was warned of his impending arrest by a university student who had been requisitioned as a translator for the German military command in Rennes.) He fled with his wife, daughter, and granddaughter to a small village near Toulouse where they lived in hiding for the remainder of the war. It was there (and despite his failing eyesight) that Hauser completed his final book, a study of the economic thought of Richelieu. With the liberation of France in 1944 Hauser and his family moved to Montpellier, hoping to return to Paris once an apartment could be found. However, Hauser's health began to fail and he died in Montpellier on 27 May 1946, shortly before his 80th birthday. His funeral, like his wedding, was a non-religious ceremony. According to Hauser, he had lost his religious faith when preparing for his Bar Mitzvah and "everything in the synagogue seemed dead". In 1945 the Académie française had awarded him the Prix de l'Académie for his life's work.

== Family ==
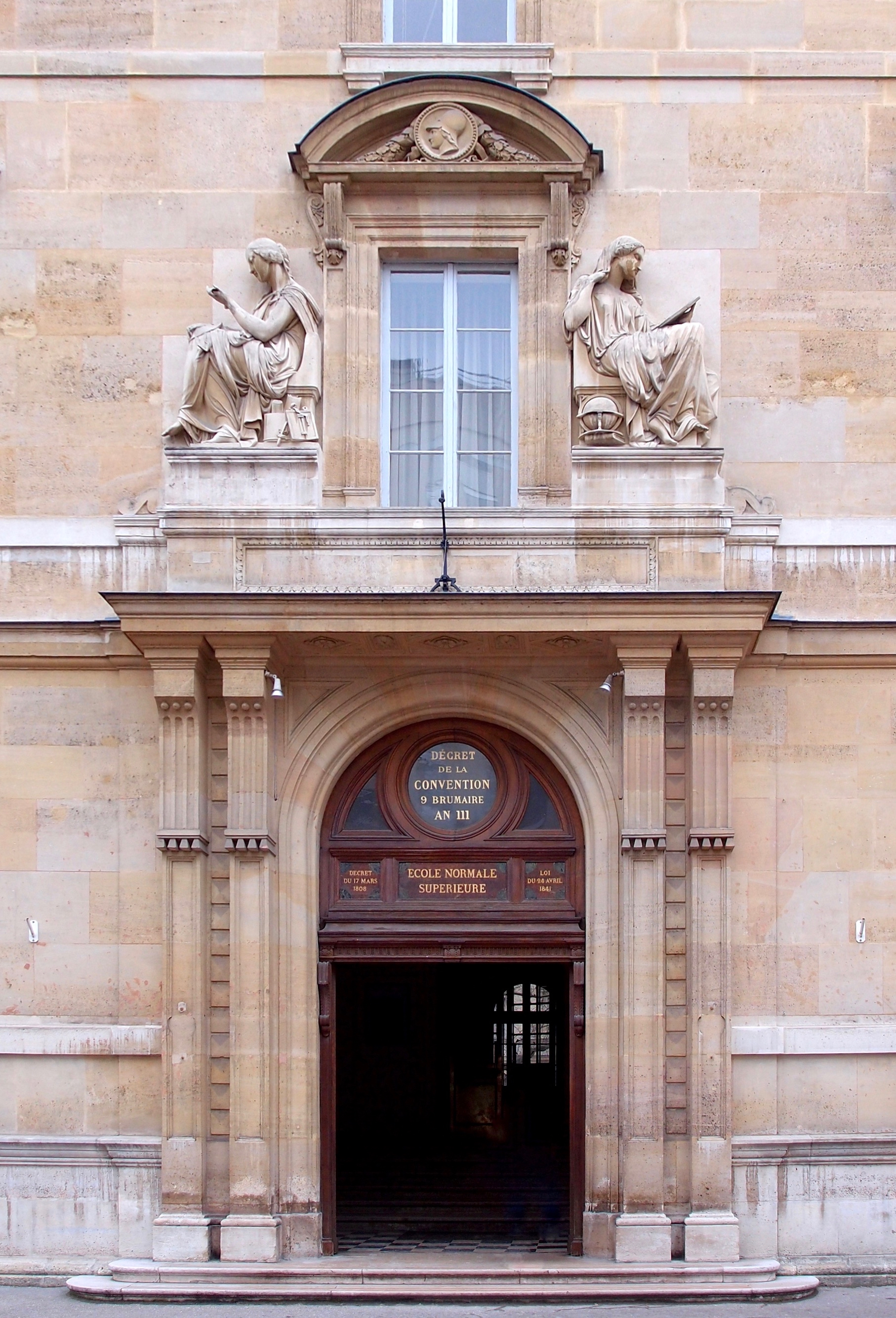
The École Normale Supérieure in Paris where Hauser studied from 1885 to 1888 and where a two-day international conference on his life and work was held in January 2003

Hauser's uncle, Henry Aron, who had played a major role in his education, died in 1885, the year Hauser entered the École Normale Supérieure. Aron, who wrote for several prominent Parisian journals and had served as the director of the Journal officiel de la République française, was awarded the Legion of Honor in 1878.

Hauser married Thérèse Franck on 3 September 1888 in a non-religious wedding ceremony, which drew disapproval from their Jewish families and from his Catholic classmates at the École Normale. Their daughter, Alice Hauser, became a bacteriologist at the main bacteriology laboratory in Dijon and was awarded the silver Médaille d'honneur des épidémies (Note: The Médaille d'honneur des épidémies was awarded by the French government between 1885 and 1962 for outstanding work in the prevention or combat of epidemics.) by the French War Ministry in 1916. Alice married Jean Dabert, a lawyer from Metz, in 1922. The following year their daughter Françoise was born.

Hauser's elder brother, Félix-Paul, died in 1916. He had a long career in the French civil service, primarily in French Indochina, and was awarded the Legion of Honor in 1909 for his role in the Colonial Exhibition of Marseille.

Henri Hauser's great-grandson, Denis Crouzet, followed in his footsteps and became a specialist in the history of the Reformation and a professor at the Sorbonne. He is the son of the historian François Crouzet and Hauser's granddaughter Françoise Dabert-Hauser.

Hauser's account of his childhood and youth and his family's history appears in his unfinished memoirs, Souvenirs d'un vieux grand-père à sa petite fille (Memories of an Old Grandfather for his Granddaughter). The draft of the memoirs was amongst the papers Hauser had to leave behind in Rennes in his flight from the city in 1942. One of the professors at the university there hid the papers in his own house for the remainder of the war and was later able to return the draft to Hauser's widow. Extracts from the memoirs were published in 2006 in Henri Hauser (1866–1946): humaniste, historien, républicain. The book is a collection of papers delivered at a two-day international colloquium on the life and work of Hauser held in January 2003 at the École Normale Supérieure in Paris.

== Prizes and awards ==
- 1902 Académie française, Prix Montyon for L'Or
- 1903 Académie des Sciences Morales et Politiques, Prix François-Joseph Audiffred for L'enseignement des sciences sociales
- 1919 Chevalier of the Legion of Honor, promoted to Officier in 1934
- 1924 Académie française, Prix Montyon for Propos d'un ignorant sur l'économie nationale
- 1941 Académie française, Prix Eugène Carrière for La naissance du Protestantisme
- 1945 Académie française, Prix de l'Académie for Hauser's life work
