= Pierre Léon (historian) =

French historian (1914–1976)

Pierre Léon (24 November 1914 – 12 October 1976) was a French historian.

== Life ==
Born in the 2nd arrondissement of Lyon, he became an innovator in economic history, publishing his thesis La Naissance de la grande industrie en Dauphiné (fin du XVIIe siecle-1869) (The birth of major industry in the Dauphiné (end of the 17th century - 1869)) in 1954, the first major economical study of that region.

He became professor at the University of Lyon, where he founded the Centre d'histoire économique et sociale de la région lyonnaise (later renamed after him) and encouraged it for several years before moving to the Sorbonne. He became a member of the consultative committee on universities and president of the French Association of Economic Historians, which later became the French Association of Economic History.

A student of Marc Bloch then Ernest Labrousse, he contributed to several collective works, particularly the treatise Histoire économique et sociale de la France (Braudel-Labrousse), Presses universitaires de France, 1970-1982 (later republications) as well as instigating and heading the six-volume Histoire économique et sociale du monde (Armand Colin, 1970–1978). In 1968 he also set up the Bulletin du Centre d'histoire économique et sociale de la région lyonnaise, later renamed the Bulletin du Centre Pierre Léon and now known as the Cahiers du Centre Pierre Léon d'histoire économique et sociale He died at Saint-Mandé.

== Works ==
- Deux siècles d'activité minière et metallurgique en Dauphiné : L'usine d'Allevard (1675-1870), Revue de Géographie alpine, 1948, pp. 215–258.
- La Naissance de la grande industrie en Dauphiné (fin du XVIII siecle -1869) 2 volumes, Faculté des lettres de Grenoble, PUF, 1954.
- Économie et Diplomatie : les Relations commerciales delphino-piémontaises au début du XVIII siecle (1700-1730), Cahiers d'histoire, 1960, pp 277–304.
- La guerre économique franco-sarde au début du XVIII siecle. Étude des relations commerciales delphino-piémontaises (1700-1730), Bulletin du C. T. H. S. Section d'histoire moderne et contemporaine (1961) pp. 615–620.
- « Les Techniques métallurgiques dauphinoises au XVIIIe siècle », dans : Histoire de la Pensée, V, Paris, Hermann, 1961.
- Marchands et spéculateurs dauphinois dans le monde antillais du XVIII siecle, Les Belles Lettres (1963)
- « Crises et adaptations de la métallurgie alpine. L'usine d'Allevard (1869-1914) » Cahiers d'histoire, Grenoble (1963).
- La région lyonnaise dans l'histoire économique et sociale de la France. Une esquisse (XVIe-XXe siècles), Revue historique, 1966, pp. 31–62.
- Économies et sociétés de l'Amérique latine, SEDES, 1969.
- Économies et sociétés préindustrielles : 1650-1780 t. 2, Armand Colin, 1970.
- Géographie de la fortune et structures sociales à Lyon au XIX siecle (1815-1914), Lyon, Université Lyon II, 1974.
- Une bibliographie plus longue est disponible sur le site d'IdRef Sudoc.

== Bibliography (in French) ==
- François Caron, « Pierre Léon » in Revue historique, 1977, volume 257, pp. 527–531 online version.
- Lionel Dumond, « LÉON, Pierre (1914-1976) » in Christian Amalvi (ed.), Dictionnaire biographique des historiens français et francophones. De Grégoire de Tours à Georges Duby, Paris, La boutique de l'histoire, 2004, p. 191.
- Maurice Garden, « Hommage à Pierre Léon », Bulletin du Centre Pierre Léon, n° 2, 1977 online version.
- Pierre Goubert, « Pierre Léon, de Lyon » dans Un parcours d'historien. Souvenirs 1915-1995, Fayard, 1996, pp. 174–177.
