= Augustin Renaudet =

French historian

Augustin Renaudet (9 January 1880 – 15 November 1958) was a French historian, and professor of the Collège de France. He was a specialist in humanism in early modern France and Italy.

== Works ==
- Les sources de l'histoire de France aux Archives d'État de Florence, des guerres d'Italie à la Révolution (1494–1789) (1916)
- Préréforme et humanisme à Paris pendant les premières guerres d'Italie (1494–1517) (1916)
- Le concile gallican de Pise et de Milan (1922)
- Erasme, sa pensée religieuse et son action d'après sa correspondance (1518–1521) (1926)
- Les débuts de l'âge moderne: la Renaissance et la Réforme (1929) with Henri Hauser
- La Fin du Moyen Age (1931) with others
- Études sur l'histoire de l'État prussien de 1714 à 1786 (1938)
- Études sur l'histoire de la Réforme (1939)
- Études érasmiennes (1521–1529) (1939)
- Études sur la France du temps de Louis XIV (vie économique et sociale) (1940)
- Machiavel - Étude d'histoire des doctrines politiques (1942)
- La France de 1559 à 1610 (1944) Sorbonne course
- L'Angleterre de 1714 à 1789 (1944) Sorbonne course
- Histoire générale de l'Europe de 1559 à 1661 (1945)
- Les Pays-Bas espagnols et les Provinces Unies de 1598 à 1714 (1946)
- Dante Humaniste (1952)
- Erasme et l'Italie (1955)
- Humanisme et Renaissance (1958)
- Erasme. Œuvres choisies
