= Francis Rapp =

French historian (1926–2020)

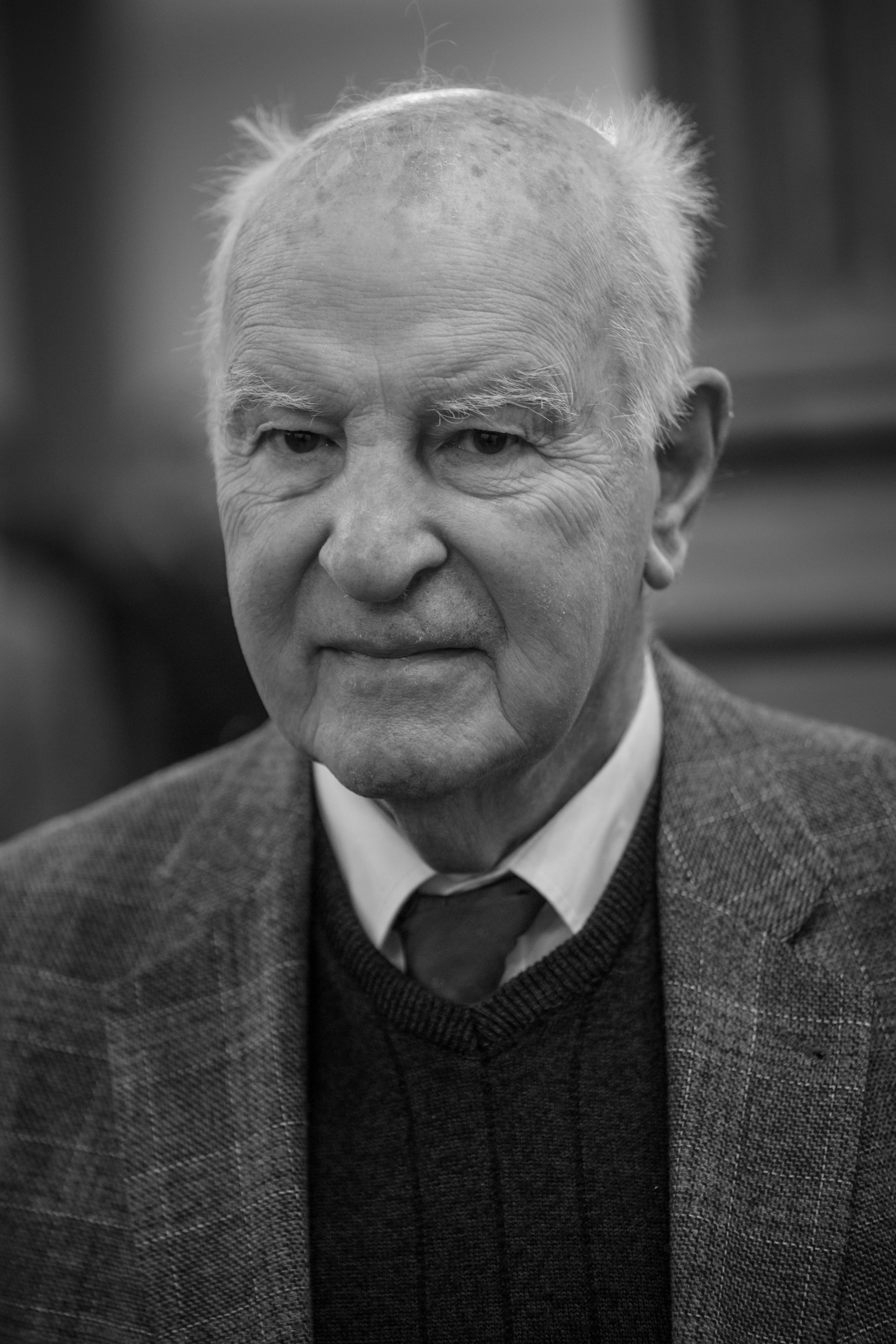
- Francis Rapp in 2014
- Born: 27 June 1926; Strasbourg, France
- Died: 29 March 2020 (aged 93); Angers, France
- Occupation: Medievalist
- Organizations: Nancy 2 University; Faculté de théologie protestante de Strasbourg
- Awards: Prix Guizot; Prix Eugène-Piccard

Francis Rapp (27 June 1926 – 29 March 2020) was a French medievalist specializing in the history of Alsace and medieval Germany. An emeritus university professor, he was a member of the Académie des inscriptions et belles-lettres since 1993.

== Life ==
=== Youth ===
Born in Strasbourg, the son of lawyer Léon Rapp, Rapp was born into a Catholic and patriotic family. He did his secondary studies at the Jean Sturm Gymnasium and practiced scouting within the Scouts de France. Breaking with forced incorporation, he joined a clandestine scouting group that gathered about twenty young people at the Mont Sainte-Odile from December 1942. At the end of the 1960s he joined the Association des Guides et Scouts d'Europe and was commissioner of the Alsace Province until the mid-1980s.

=== Academic career ===
Rapp graduated as a major of the agrégation d'histoire in 1952, then was a teacher at the Lycée Fustel-de-Coulanges de Strasbourg between 1952 and 1953 and a resident of the Fondation Thiers from 1956 to 1961; he was a lecturer at the faculté des lettres de Nancy from 1961 to 1972, then an assistant in medieval history at the Marc Bloch University of Strasbourg. After becoming a Doctor of Letters in 1972, he was a lecturer and then a professor at the University of Strasbourg from 1974.

A lecturer in the history of Christianity at the Faculté de théologie protestante de Strasbourg between 1972 and 1991, Rapp was an associate professor at the university of Neuchâtel and a visiting scholar at several universities in North America and Europe.

Rapp was a member of the Consultative Committee of Universities, the Higher Council of University Bodies, the national committee of the Centre national de la recherche scientifique, the scientific council and the board of directors of the École nationale des chartes and the École française de Rome. He was also a member of the Académie des sciences, lettres et arts d'Alsace, the Académie des Marches de l’Est and the Göttingen Academy of Sciences and Humanities.

A member of the editorial board of the review Archiv für Reformationsgeschichte and a contributor to the Encyclopédie de l'Alsace and the Nouveau dictionnaire de biographie alsacienne, Rapp was elected in 1993 as a member of the Académie des inscriptions et belles-lettres in the seat of Emmanuel Laroche.

Rapp died on 29 March 2020 in Angers at the age of 93, following an infection from COVID-19.

== Honours ==
- Chevalier of the Légion d'honneur
- Commandeur de l'Ordre national du Mérite (He was promoted to the rank of Officer on 24 June 2005, and then received the rank of Commandeur by decree dated 13 May 2016.)
- Commandeur de l'ordre des Palmes académiques

== Awards ==
- Prix Guizot (2001).
- Prix Eugène-Piccard of the Académie française (1983).

== Publications ==
Rapp's publications are listed in the Regesta Imperii database, including;

- Inventaire des sources manuscrites de l’histoire d’Alsace conservées dans les bibliothèques publiques de France, Paris, Fédération des sociétés d’histoire et d’archéologie d'Alsace, 1956.
- Le château-fort dans la vie médiévale : le château-fort et la politique territoriale, Strasbourg, Centre d'Archéologie médiévale, 1968.
- L’Église et la vie religieuse en Occident à la fin du Moyen Âge, Paris, PUF, coll. "Nouvelle Clio", 1971, ISBN 978-2130505396.
- Réformes et réformation à Strasbourg. Église et société dans le diocèse de Strasbourg (1450–1525), Paris, Ophrys, 1974.
- Grandes figures de l’humanisme alsacien. Courants, milieux, destins, Strasbourg, Istra, 1978.
- Histoire de Strasbourg des origines à nos jours [under his dir.], 9 vols, Strasbourg, Dernières nouvelles de Strasbourg, 1981.
- Les origines médiévales de l’Allemagne moderne. De Charles IV à Charles Quint (1346–1519), Paris, Éditions Aubier-Montaigne, 1989, ISBN 978-2700722246.
- Histoire des diocèses de France : Le Diocèse de Strasbourg, Paris, Éditions Beauchesne, 1997.
- Koenigsbruck : l’histoire d’une abbaye cistercienne (with Claude Muller), Strasbourg, Société d’histoire et d’archéologie du Ried Nord, 1998.
- Le Saint-Empire romain germanique, d’Otton le Grand à Charles Quint, Paris, Éditions du Seuil, 2003. ISBN 978-2020555272
- Christentum und Kirche im 4. und 5. Jahrhundert, Heidelberg, Universitätsverlag Winter, 2003, ISBN 978-3825315238
- Christentum IV : Zwischen Mittelalter und Neuzeit (1378–1552), Stuttgart, Kohlhammer, 2006, ISBN 9783170152786
- Maximilien d'Autriche, Paris, Éditions Tallandier, 2007. ISBN 978-2-84734-053-2
- Protestants et protestantisme en Alsace de 1517 à nos jours [under his dir.], Strasbourg, Fédération des sociétés d’histoire et d’archéologie d'Alsace, 2007.
- Strasbourg [under his dir.], Paris, La Nuée Bleue, 2010.
