= Charles-Edouard Levillain =

French historian

Charles-Édouard Levillain (born 1971), FRHistS, MAE, is a French historian of early modern Britain and the Low Countries. He is professor of British history at Paris Cité University.

== Education and career ==
Levillain was educated at the École Normale Supérieure in Paris. He holds a BA in History from the Sorbonne (Paris 1) and a degree in Public Law and Administration from Sciences Po. He obtained his PhD from the Sorbonne Nouvelle University in 2003.

Levillain has held fellowships at King's College London (1999-2000), the Netherlands Institute for Advanced Study (2007-2008), Yale University (James Osborne Fellow, 2008-2009), Churchill College, Cambridge (2011), the Casa de Velázquez (2011), the Leibniz Institute of European History (2014), the Humboldt Foundation (2017-2018), New College, Oxford (2018) and the University of Utrecht (2022-2023). A Fellow of the Royal Historical Society since 2016, he is also a member of Academia Europaea since 2021 and ‘foreign member’ of the Koninklijke Hollandsche Maatschappij der Wetenschappen since 2025. He was Vice President for International Strategy at Université Paris Cité in the founding year of the university (2020).

== Scholarship ==
Levillain’s work focuses primarily on the history of Anglo-Franco-Dutch relations under the late Stuarts, with special interest in the figure of Stadholder-King William III (1650-1702). His first book, Vaincre Louis XIV (2010), about the emergence of the Anglo-Dutch alliance against Louis XIV, was awarded the Prix Guizot by the French Academy (2011). His second book, Un glaive pour un royaume (2014), tells the story of militia debates in Stuart England, explaining that the distinction between standing armies and militias has been exaggerated since the seventeenth century for reasons of political convenience. It was praised as a “clear-headed and engrossingly heretical” contribution to historians' knowledge of standing army debates. Le procès de Louis XIV. François-Paul de Lisola (1613-1674), ennemi de la France et citoyen du monde (2015) charts the intellectual career of the diplomat and Imperial publicist François-Paul de Lisola, one of Louis XIV’s fiercest early critics in Europe. Levillain also co-edited a volume on the reception of Louis XIV’s images outside France between 1661 and 1715, with Tony Claydon. Another co-edited volume followed in 2018 on the long-term legacy of Louis XIV’s reign in Europe (1715-2015).

In 2021, he was awarded the Descartes-Huygens Prize by the Royal Netherlands Academy of Arts and Sciences.

== Works ==
=== Monographs and edited volumes ===
- (with Sven Externbrink) Penser l’après-Louis XIV. Histoire, mémoire, représentation (1715-2015), Paris, Honoré Champion, 2018.
- Le procès de Louis XIV. Une guerre psychologique. François-Paul de Lisola (1613-1674), citoyen du monde, ennemi de la France, Paris, Tallandier, 2015.
- (with Tony Claydon) Louis XIV Outside In. Images of the Sun King beyond France 1661-1715, Farnham, Ashgate, 2015.
- Un glaive pour un royaume. La querelle de la milice dans l’Angleterre du XVIIe siècle, Paris, Honoré Champion, 2014.
- Vaincre Louis XIV. Angleterre, Hollande, France: histoire d'une relation triangulaire (1665-1688), Seyssel, Champ Vallon, 2010.

=== Articles and essays (selection) ===
- “Résilience d’une république à l’époque moderne : les Provinces-Unies”, Résilience démocratique. Éléments de sociologie historique, eds. Jean Baechler & Alexandre Escudier, Paris, Hermann, 2024, pp.165-177.
- “Diplomático y publicista : el barón François-Paul de Lisola en la corte de Madrid (1665-1666)” (trans. Cristina Bravo), Los embajadores. Representantes de la soberanía, garantes del equilibrio, 1659-1748, eds. Cristina Bravo-Lozano & Antonio Álvarez-Ossorio, Madrid, Marcial Pons, 2021, pp.34-47.
- (with Mark Goldie), “François-Paul de Lisola and English Opposition to Louis XIV”, The Historical Journal, 63/3, 2020, pp.559-580.
- “An Art of Translation : Churchill’s Uses of Eighteenth-century British History”, XVII-XVIII. Revue de la Société d’études anglo-américaines des XVIIe et XVIIIe siècles, vol.76, 2019, pp. 1–15.
- “England’s ‘Natural Frontier’ : Andrew Marvell and the Low Countries”, The Oxford Handbook of Andrew Marvell, ed. Martin Dzelzainis and Edward Holberton, Oxford, OUP, 2019, pp. 114–127.
- “French diplomacy and the run-up to the Glorious Revolution: a critical reading of Jean-Antoine d’Avaux’ correspondence as ambassador to the States General (1688)”. The Journal of Modern History, vol.88/1, 2016, pp.130-150.
- “Un reste apparent de grandeur: la controverse du stathoudérat et la question du déclin de la Hollande (c.1720-c.1750)”, Regards français sur l’Âge d’Or néerlandais, ed. Catherine Secrétan, Paris, Honoré Champion, 2015, pp. 163–197.
- “La route des Flandres. La crise de l’Exclusion et l’exil bruxellois du duc d’York (1679)”, Revue XVIIe siècle, n°4, 2013, pp. 663–679. Spanish version in Vísperas de sucesión. Europa y la Monarquía de Carlos II, ed. Bernardo García García and A. Álvarez-Ossorio, Madrid, Fundación Carlos de Amberes, 2015, pp. 239–258.
- “Monarchie et république 1660-1960”, Deshima, n°8, Les relations franco-néerlandaises, 2014, pp. 95–108.
- "Churchill historien de Marlborough”, Commentaire, n°139, 2012, pp. 781–787.
- “Une guerre secrète contre Louis XIV. L’Espagne, la Hollande et les projets de révolte de 1674”, Mélanges de la Casa de Velázquez, 42-2, 2012, pp. 201–233.
- “Si vis bellum para pacem. Louis XIV, Charles II, Guillaume III d’Orange et la ‘célèbre ambassade’ de 1665”, Revue d'histoire diplomatique, n°3, 2011, pp. 247–268.
- “Le coup d’État permanent? Papistes et antipapistes dans l’Angleterre des Stuarts (1640-1689)”, Rome, l’unique objet de mon ressentiment. Le territoire disputé de l’église de Rome de la gifle d’Agnani (1303) à la controverse de Ratisbonne (2006), ed. Philippe Boutry and Philippe Levillain, Rome, École française de Rome, 2011, pp. 230–250.
- “Thomas Macaulay ou comment s’en débarrasser. Autour d’un livre de Steve Pincus. Nouvelles perspectives historiographiques sur la Glorieuse Révolution (1688)”, Histoire, Économie & Société, n°1, 2011, pp. 1–20.
- “Glory without Power? Montesquieu's trip to Holland (1729) and his vision of the Dutch fiscal-military state”, The Journal of the History of European Ideas, vol.36, 2010, pp. 181–191.
- “La correspondance diplomatique dans l'Europe moderne (c.1550-c.1750): tentative de définition et problèmes de méthode », Cultural Transfers : France and Britain in the long eighteenth century. Studies on Voltaire and the Eighteenth Century, ed. Ann Thomson, Simon Burrows and Edmond Dziembowski, Oxford, Voltaire Foundation, 2010, pp. 43–56.
- “Les préparatifs de la guerre de Hollande à l’aune d’un incident diplomatique (1669-1670)”, L’incident diplomatique à l’époque moderne, ed. Lucien Bély and Géraud Poumarède, Paris, Pédone, 2010, pp. 261–280.
- “Cromwell Redivivus? William III as Military Dictator: Myth and Reality”, Redefining William III. The Impact of the King-Stadholder in International Context, ed. Esther Mijers and David Onnekink, Aldershot, Ashgate, 2007, pp. 159–176.
- “London besieged? Roger Morrice’s perception of the City’s vulnerability during the Glorious Revolution”, Fear, Exclusion and Revolution: Roger Morrice and Britain in the 1680s, ed. Jason McElligott, Aldershot, Ashgate, 2006, pp. 91–107.
- “William’s III military and political career in neo-Roman context (1672-1702)”, The Historical Journal, vol.48/2, 2005, pp. 321–350.

=== Novels ===
- Edouard Beaufort (pen name), Le genou de Vénus, Paris, Stock, 1995, 281 p.
