= François Crouzet =

French historian

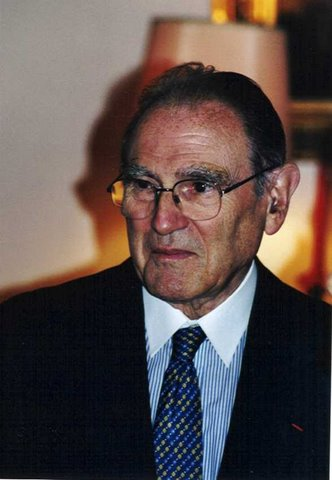
- Born: François Marie-Joseph Crouzet; 20 October 1922; Monts-sur-Guesnes, France
- Died: 20 March 2010 (aged 87)
- Education: École Normale Supérieure; Université de Paris-Sorbonne
- Occupation: Historian

François Crouzet (20 October 1922 – 20 March 2010) was a French historian. Considered the greatest French historian of Britain of his generation, he was Professor Emeritus of Modern History at the Université de Paris-Sorbonne at the time of his death.

== Life and career ==
Crouzet was born in Monts-sur-Guesnes, the son of Maurice Crouzet who served as the Inspector General for History under France's Ministry of National Education. After graduating with his Baccalauréat from the Lycée Hoche in 1939, he was admitted to the École Normale Supérieure which his father had also attended. He passed his Agrégation in history with full marks in 1945 and began teaching at a lycée in Beauvais. Between 1946 and 1949 he was in the UK on fellowships to carry out research in British history that would ultimately form the basis of his doctoral dissertation. Based at the London School of Economics and the Institute of Historical Research and spending much of his time in the Public Record Office, he became a life-long Anglophile. During his London years, he met and married Françoise Dabert-Hauser, the granddaughter of the French historian Henri Hauser.

On his return to France in 1949 he worked as a lecturer at the Paris Institute of Political Studies until 1956 and was also a teaching assistant in contemporary history at the Sorbonne (1949–1953) and a professor at the Lycée Janson de Sailly (1953–1956). He received his doctorate in 1956 with his dissertation, L'économie britannique et le blocus continental (1806-1813), a two-volume study on the economic impact of the Napoleonic blockade of Britain. The thesis, which received the unanimous congratulations of the jury, was published two years later and made an immediate impact. It was awarded the Prix Georges Mauguin by the Académie des sciences morales et politiques and was published in a revised and expanded second edition in 1988. Much of his subsequent work and research stemmed from the ideas that he explored in the book.

From 1956 to 1968, he held successive professorships at the universities of Bordeaux, Lille, and Nanterre. In 1969 he was appointed to the Chair of Northern European History at the Sorbonne, a position he held until his retirement in 1992. Throughout his career he also held a variety of visiting professorships: Columbia University (1961), University of California Berkeley (1964), Harvard University (1981–1982), University of Virginia (1996), and the University of Geneva (1970–1973). He was also a visiting fellow at Wolfson College, Cambridge in 1969 and All Souls College, Oxford in 1976 and 1985.

François Crouzet died in 2010 at the age of 87, survived by his wife Françoise (1923–2014) and their three children, Marie-Anne Dalem née Crouzet and Denis Crouzet (both historians) and Joël Crouzet (a molecular biologist). He dedicated the final years of his life to writing his memoirs. They were published posthumously in 2012 as De mémoire d'historien: Chroniques d'un XX^{e} siècle disparu with an introduction by Denis Crouzet.

== Bibliography in English ==
Several of Crouzet's key books have been published in English or in English translation. These include:

- Capital Formation in the Industrial Revolution (Methuen, 1972)
- The Victorian Economy (Methuen, 1982), published in French as L'Économie de la Grande-Bretagne victorienne (Société d'édition d'enseignement supérieur, 1978)
- Britain Ascendant: Comparative Studies in Franco-British Economic History (Cambridge University Press, 1985), published in French as De la Superiorite de l'Angleterre sur la France (Perrin, 1985)
- The First Industrialists: The Problem of Origins (Cambridge University Press, 1985)
- Britain, France, and International Commerce: From Louis XIV to Victoria (Ashgate Variorum, 1995)
- A History of the European Economy, 1000-2000 (University Press of Virginia, 2001), published in French as Histoire de l’économie européenne 1000-2000 (Albin Michel, 2000)

== Awards and distinctions ==
François Crouzet received honorary doctorates from the University of Birmingham (1977), University of Kent (1985), University of Leicester (1989), and the University of Edinburgh (1993). His other awards and distinctions include:

- 1959 Prix Georges Mauguin, Académie des sciences morales et politiques for L'économie britannique et le blocus continental
- 1973 elected Fellow of the British Academy

Liberty and creativity were the source of Europe's power in the past, of the dominance that it once had in the world, and of an economic growth that, contrary to what false prophets claim, is the necessary condition for reducing poverty. Is it too optimistic to think that Europeans will remain committed to liberty and that creativity will flourish again?

— François Crouzet, Histoire de l’économie européenne 1000-2000. p. 423
- 1980 Honorary Commander of the Order of the British Empire
- 1985 Commandeur, Ordre des Palmes académiques
- 1987 Grand Prix d'Histoire de la Ville de Paris
- 1995 Chevalier, Légion d’honneur
- 2001 Prix Guizot, Académie française for Histoire de l’économie européenne 1000-2000
- 2008 Prix Rossi, Académie des sciences morales et politiques for La guerre économique franco-anglaise au XVIIIe siècle
