= Philippe Canaye =

French jurist and diplomat

Philippe de La Canaye, sieur de Fresnes (1551–27 February 1610) was a French jurist and diplomat.

== Life ==
He was born in Paris, son of an advocate of the Parlement; he was brought up liberally and allowed to choose his beliefs, which became Calvinist. He travelled aged 15 in Germany and Italy and to Istanbul. He then took up the law and became prominent at the bar of the Parlement.

Under Henry III of France he purchased a position as councillor. Henry IV sent him as ambassador to England (1586), Switzerland (1588) and to Germany.

He was président de la chambre at Castres in 1595; and in 1600 Henry IV made him arbiter at the Fontainebleau conferences between Cardinal Jacques Du Perron for the Catholics, and Philippe Duplessis-Mornay for the Protestants. He became a Catholic convert in 1601.

From 1602 he was ambassador at Venice; at the time of the Venetian Interdict he skilfully resolved differences of the Republic with Pope Paul V, who showed gratitude. He died in Paris.

== Works ==
He left an account of his embassies, memoirs (1635), and a work on the Organon of Aristotle (1589).

- Extrait des Lettres et ambassade, t. 3, livre 5, Paris, Étienne Richer, 1636
- Lettres et ambassade de messire Philippe Canaye, seigneur de Fresne,... avec un sommaire de sa vie, et un récit particulier du procès criminel fait au maréchal de Biron, Paris, E. Richer, 1635-1636
- L’Organe, c’est-à-dire l'instrument du discours, divisé en deux parties, sçavoir est, l’analytique, pour discourir véritablement, et la dialectique, pour discourir probablement. Le tout puisé de l'″Organe″ d'Aristote, Genève, Jean de Tournes, 1589
- Remonstrances et discours faicts et prononcez en la Cour et Chambre de l'édict establie à Castres d'Albigeois, pour le ressort de la Cour de Parlement de Tholose, par messire Philippe Canaye, seigneur de Fresnes,... et président en laditte Cour, Paris, J. Périer, 1598
- Le Voyage du Levant : de Venise à Constantinople, l’émerveillement d’un jeune humaniste (1573), translation with notes by Henri Hauser, Ferrières, Éd. de Poliphile, 1986 ISBN 2-86888-009-6
