= François Caron (historian) =

French historian (1931–2014)

François Caron (24 March 1931 – 14 December 2014) was a French economic historian, specialising in the economic history of France from the 19th century onwards.

== Life ==
Born in Hazebrouck and gaining a diploma from the Institut d'études politiques de Paris in 1953, he became an associate professor of history in 1956 and was posted to the research body of the CNRS in 1965. He then became assistant then assistant master at the University of Nanterre, defending a doctoral thesis on the Compagnie du chemin de fer du Nord between 1846 and 1937.

== Works ==
=== Railway history ===
Apart from his thesis, in 1973 he published via éditions Mouton a three-volume histoire des chemins de fer en France.

- Histoire des chemins de fer en France, Tome 1, 1740-1883, Fayard, 1997 - (Prix Guizot 1998)
- Histoire des chemins de fer en France, Tome 2, 1883-1937, Fayard, 2005
- Histoire des chemins de fer en France, Tome 3, 1937–1997, Fayard, 2017

=== General history ===
- La France des patriotes (1852-1918), volume 5 of the Histoire de France edited by Jean Favier, Fayard, 1985
