= Monts-sur-Guesnes =

- Commune
- Coat of arms
- Location of Monts-sur-Guesnes
- Location within France Location within Nouvelle-Aquitaine
- Coordinates: 46°55′11″N 0°12′45″E
- Country: France
- Region: Nouvelle-Aquitaine
- Department: Vienne
- Arrondissement: Châtellerault
- Canton: Loudun
- Intercommunality: Pays Loudunais

Government
  - Mayor (2022–2026): Olivier Briand
- Area^{1}: 11.4 km^{2} (4.4 sq mi)
- Elevation: 172 m (564 ft)
- Highest elevation: 146 m (479 ft)
- Lowest elevation: 66 m (217 ft)
- Population (2023): 921
  - Density: 80.8/km^{2} (209/sq mi)
- Time zone: UTC+01:00 (CET)
  - Summer (DST): UTC+02:00 (CEST)
- INSEE/Postal code: 86167 /86420
- ^{1} French Land Register data, which excludes lakes, ponds, glaciers > 1 km^{2} (0.386 sq mi or 247 acres) and river estuaries.

Monts-sur-Guesnes (French pronunciation: [mɔ̃ syʁ ɡɛn], literally Monts on Guesnes) is a commune in the Vienne department in the Nouvelle-Aquitaine region in western France.

== Administration ==
List of successive Mayors:

Mayor	Term
Pierre Vincent	1792 - 1796
Jean-Baptiste Bernier	1796 - 1813
Baltazard Gravier	1813 - 1816
Jean-Baptiste Bernier	1816 - 1827
François Archambault	1827 - 1830
Édouard Lesage	1830 - 1832
Jean-Baptiste Sertier	1832 - 1847
Édouard Lesage	1847 - 1848
Ludovic Beranger	1848 - 1852
Edouard Lesage	1852 - 1865
Jean-Baptiste Sertier	1865 - 1871
Denis-Clément Guiet	1871 - 1877
Justin Pichot	1877 - 1886
Paul Guiet	1886 - 1888
François Millet Pichot	1888 - 1926
Georges Millet	1926 - 1928
Paul Raud	1928 - 1946
Maurice Delagarde	1946 - 1947
Paul Raud	1947 - 1957
Maurice Pichot	1957 - 1965
Remy Moinard	1965 - 1971
Mary Delachaume	1971 - 1977
Remy Moinard	1977 - 1989
Chantal Hartl	1989 - 2001
Bruno Belin	2001 - 2015
Alain Bourreau	2015 - 2022
Olivier Briand	2022 - incumbent

== Demographics ==
Historical population
Year	Pop.	±% p.a.
1968	713	—
1975	653	−1.25%
1982	642	−0.24%
1990	620	−0.43%
1999	641	+0.37%
2007	626	−0.30%
2012	693	+2.05%
2017	895	+5.25%
2023	921	+0.48%
Source: INSEE

== See also ==
- Communes of the Vienne department
