= Madeleine Laurain-Portemer =

French historian

- Born: 7 June 1917; Laval
- Died: 15 August 1996 (aged 89); Saint-Brieuc
- Occupation: Historian
- Spouse: Jean Portemer (1911–1998)

Madeleine Laurain-Portemer (7 June 1917 – 15 August 1996) was a 20th-century French historian, specializing in the history of Mazarin and his time, married to Jean Portemer (1911–1998).

== Biography ==
An archivist palaeographer graduated from the École Nationale des Chartes, and the daughter of Ernest Laurain, Madeleine Laurain-Portemer was curator at the cabinet of manuscripts of the Bibliothèque nationale de France from 1941 to 1964 and master of research at the CNRS from 1970 to 1982. She was a specialist of Mazarin.

== Prize ==
The Madeleine Laurain-Portemer prize of the Académie des sciences morales et politiques was established in 1998 by dean Jean Portemer, specializing in the history of Mazarin and his time. This annual award is intended to honor the author of a book on a subject devoted to the History of Modern Times (1492–1789).

== Work ==
=== Books ===
- Les trésors de la Bibliothèque nationale, Département des manuscrits : Jean Fouquet et son temps, : Paris : Publ. filmées d'art et d'histoire, 1961; 40 p. + 20 diapositives;
- Études mazarines, Paris : de Boccard; [puis] Paris : [M. Laurain-Portemer]; Nogent-le-Roi : distrib. J. Laget, Librairie des arts et métiers, 1981-1997;

=== Publications ===
- Un pèlerinage littéraire rue du Cherche-Midi l'Hôtel Saint-Simon, Paris, 1957, 5 p.; In-4, Extr. de : "Médecine de France." N ° 83, 1957;
- Les Travaux d'érudition des Mauristes, origine et évolution, Paris, 1957. - In-8 ̊, paginé 231–271., Extrait de la Revue d'histoire de l'Église de France, t. 43, N ̊ 140, 1957;
- La mort du cardinal Mazarin , [Paris] : [Annuaire-Bulletin de la Société de l'histoire de France], 1960, pièce (paginé 58–120); Extrait de l'Annuaire-Bulletin de la Société de l'histoire de France. - Composé de : Relazione distinta de gli accidenti occorsi nell'ultima infirmita e morte del cardinal Mazzarini... by P. Angelo Bissaro, with French translation by Madeleine Laurain et de : Relation succincte de ce qui s'est passé à la mort de M. le cardinal Mazarini, premier ministre d'Estat by Claude Joly, in collaboration with Raymond Darricau, 1960;
- Notes sur les papiers de l'abbé Lebeuf conservés dans les dépôts de Paris, Auxerre, 1962, 16 p.; In-8, Extr. de : Actes du Congrès Lebeuf;
- Le dossier des ″Lettres persanes″ / notes sur les cahiers de corrections. Une caricature peu connue de Montesquieu, Bordeaux : impr. Bière, 1963, 1 vol. (paginé 41–83) : portrait, 2 fac-sim., tableaux; Extrait de la ″Revue historique de Bordeaux et du département de la Gironde″, n̊ 1, janvier-juin 1963; republié dans la Revue Montesquieu n° 6, 2002 : http://montesquieu.ens-lyon.fr/spip.php?article328
- Mazarin, Benedetti et l'escalier de la Trinité des Monts , [Paris] : Gazette des beaux-arts, 1968, 1 pièce (paginé 273–294); Extrait de la ″Gazette des beaux-arts″, December 1968;
- Mazarin et Le Bernin à propos du "Temps qui découvre la vérité", [Paris] : [Gazette des beaux-arts], 1969, 1 pièce (paginé 185–200) : ill.; in-4, Extr. de : "Gazette des beaux-arts", oct. 1969;
- Les Préliminaires du second séjour de Romanelli à Paris, Paris, 1969, p. 387–400; In-8, Extr. from Mélanges d'Archéologie et d'Histoire publiés par l'École Française de Rome, t. 81, 1969;
- Le Statut de Mazarin dans l'Église : aperçus sur le haut clergé de la Contre-réforme, [Paris] (4, square de La Tour-Maubourg, 7th]) : M. Laurain-Portemer, 1970, 141 p.; Extr. de la "Bibliothèque de l'École des chartes", 127–128. - Notes bibliogr.;
- Une bibliothèque canonique au XVIIe : les fonds du Cardinal de Richelieu, in collaboration with Jean Portemer, 1 pièce (paginé 307–323); in-8; Extrait de : "Études d'Histoire du droit canonique" dédiées à Gabriel Le Bras [1971?];
- La Surintendance de l'état ecclésiastique : absolutisme et népotisme, Paris : [s.n.], 1973, p. 487-568; Extrait de la «Bibliothèque de l'École des chartes», t. 131, 1973;
- Opposition et propagande à Paris au temps du Sacre de Louis XIV, Paris : Publications de la Sorbonne, [1973], Paginé 253-269-12 f. : ill.; Publications de la Sorbonne. Série Études; 6;
- Le Palais Mazarin à Paris et l'offensive baroque de 1645-1650 d'après Romanelli, P. de Cortone et Grimaldi, [Paris] : Gazette des beaux-arts, 1973, 1 pièce (p. 151-168) : ill.; Extr. de la «Gazette des beaux-arts», t. 81, 1250e livraison, mars 1973;
- Aperçus sur l'historiographie du Seicento : communication faite au Colloque des chercheurs du Groupe d'histoire moderne du C.N.R.S. tenu le 15 mars 1975 à... [Paris], [S.l.] : [s.n.], [1975?], 1 vol. (21 p. multigr.);
- Mazarin militant de l'art baroque au temps de Richelieu : 1634-1642 : communication [à la séance du 1er mars 1975 de la Société de l'histoire de l'art français], Paris : [Bulletin de la Société de l'histoire de l'art français], 1976, 1 vol. (paginé 65–100); Extr. du "Bulletin de la Société de l'histoire de l'art français", 1975;
- Ministériat, finances et papauté au temps de la Réforme catholique, Paris : [s.n.], 1976, p. 396-405; Extr. de la Bibliothèque de l'École des Chartes, t.CXXXIV, 1976;
- L'Habit des Mauristes au XVIIIe, Genève : Droz, 1982, PP. 127–134; Hautes études médiévales et modernes; 47. - Extr. de : "Sous la règle de Saint Benoît (colloque structures monastiques et sociétés en France, du Moyen Âge à l'époque moderne, 1980)";
- Fortuna e sfortuna di Bernini nella Francia di Mazzarino, Roma : Istituto della Enciclopedia italiana, 1985; 17 p.-[9] p. de pl. : ill. en noir; Extrait de "Bernini e l'unità delle arte visive" under the direction of Marcello Fagiolo, Rome, 1985;
- Un Mécénat ministériel : l'exemple de Mazarin, Paris : Ed. du C. N. R. S., 1985, 1 pièce (paginé 89–106); Extr. de : "L'Âge d'or du mécénat, 1598-1661 : colloque international C. N. R. S., mars 1983";
- L'Église et le pouvoir politique à Rome pendant la réforme catholique, Angers : Presses de l'Université d'Angers, [1986], 1 pièce (paginé 233–243); Extrait de : "Églises et pouvoir politique : actes des Journées internationales d'histoire du droit d'Angers, 30 mai-1er juin 1985";
- Richelieu canoniste d'après sa bibliothèque, Paris : Imprimerie nationale, 1985, p. 293-295 : ill.; Extr. de : "Richelieu et le monde de l'esprit : [exhibition, Paris, Sorbonne, novembre 1985]";
- Monarchie et gouvernement : Mazarin et le modèle romain, Grenoble : Presses universitaires de Grenoble, 1986; p. 45-53; Extr. de : "La France et l'Italie au temps de Mazarin : 15e Colloque du C. M. R. 17, Grenoble, 25-27 janvier 1985".

=== Mayenne ===
- André de Beauvau : seigneur de Pimpéan..., Laval : Goupil, 1941, 1 pièce (12 p.); in-8; Extrait du ″Bulletin de la Commission historique de la Mayenne″, 1941;
- La fête de la gerbe dans le Bas-Maine, Laval : impr. Madiot, 1963, 1 vol. (44 p.) : 5 pl., dépliant, music; Extrait du "Bulletin de la Commission historique et archéologique de la Mayenne", t. 68, 70 et 71. - En annexes, un texte de Pierre Gaultier Battage des grains, rouleaux mécaniques. La Gerbe and a note by Gaston Orgeval on an order of Comte de Laval's verderer, dated 16 July 1760 on threshing, with the facsimile of the order;
- Le Mobilier du premier duc de Mazarin à Mayenne, [S. l.], [1969?], p. 85–102 : ill.; In-8; Extr. de : "Bulletin de la Commission historique et archéologique de la Mayenne". Octobre-décembre 1969;

=== Exhibitions ===
- Saint-Simon, 1675-1755 : exposition organisée pour le deuxième centenaire de sa mort, Paris, Bibliothèque nationale, [Galerie Mazarine, 5 juillet-15 octobre] 1955 / [catalogue réd. par Madeleine Laurain, Edmond Pognon and Alice Garrigoux. Saint-Simon à la Bibliothèque nationale / preface by Julien Cain], Paris : Bibliothèque nationale, 1955, Impr. de A. Tournon, 1 vol. (123 p.-[8] p. de pl.) : ill., portr., fac-sim., couv. ill.;
- Mazarin, homme d'État et collectionneur, 1602-1661 : exposition organisée pour le troisième centenaire de sa mort, Paris, Bibliothèque nationale, 1961 / [catalogue réd. by Madeleine Laurain-Portemer]; [pref. by Julien Cain]; [Du Palais Mazarin à la Bibliothèque nationale, introduction by Roger-Armand Weigert], Paris : Bibliothèque nationale, 1961, impr. Tournon et Cie, 1 vol. (XXXVIII-228 p.-[16] p. de pl.) : ill., portr., fac-sim., couv. ill.;
- Inauguration solennelle de la maison Mazarin à Pescina : détruite en 1915 par le tremblement de terre et réédifiée dans 1971-1972 / [discours par Madame Madeleine Laurain Portemer], Avezzano : Stab. tip. Putaturo, 1972, 1 pièce (24 p.) : ill., couv. ill. en coul.; Titre(s) parallèle(s) : Inaugurazione solenne della casa Mazzarino in Pescina distrutta dal terremoto del 1915e ricostruita entro l'anno giugno 1971-giugno 1972;
