= Elisabeth Crouzet-Pavan =

French historian and teacher

Élisabeth Crouzet-Pavan
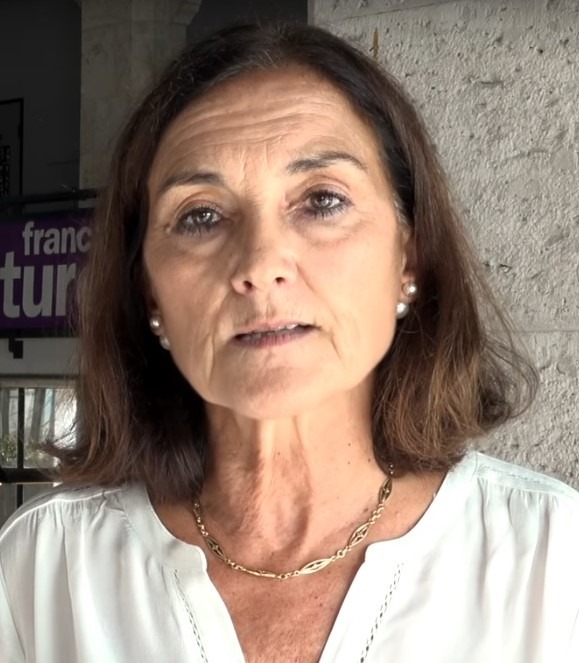
- Born: Élisabeth Pavan; 1953 (age 72–73); Paris
- Known for: History of Venice
- Spouse: Denis Crouzet

Élisabeth Crouzet-Pavan or Elisabeth Crouzet-Pavan (born 1953) is a French historian and teacher. She is a professor at the University of Paris-Sorbonne. She is known for her knowledge of Venice in the late Middle Ages.

== Life ==
Crouzet-Pavan was born in Paris in 1953. She worked first teaching history and geography to secondary school age children. She took her doctorate in 1989 based on the history of Venice. She is known for her interest in the history of Italy and particularly her knowledge of Venice in the late Middle Ages.

She is married to another historian Professor Denis Crouzet. She is a professor at the University of Paris-Sorbonne.

She won the Prix Guizot in 2002. In 2005, one of her books, "Venice Triumphant: The Horizons of a Myth", was published in English - thanks to a translation by Lydia Cochrane.

== Works ==
- Sopra le acque salse. Espaces, pouvoirs et société à Venise à la fin du Moyen Âge, 1992.
- La mort lente de Torcello: histoire d'une cité disparue, Fayard, 1995.
- Venise, une invention de la ville (XIIIe-XVe siècle), Champvallon, 1997.
- Pouvoir et édilité dans l'Italie communale et seigneuriale, 2003.
- Venise triomphante, les horizons d'un mythe, Albin Michel, 1999.
- Enfers et paradis. L'Italie de Dante et de Giotto, Albin Michel, 2001.
- Towards an Ecological History of Venice
- Renaissances italiennes (1380–1500), Albin Michel, 2007. ISBN 978-2-226-17111-5.
- Les Villes vivantes. Italie XIIIe-XVe siècles, Fayard, 2009. ISBN 978-2-213-64265-9.

== Awards ==
Crouzet-Pavan became a knight of the Legion of Honour in 2008. In 2012, she received an honorary doctorate from the University of Ghent. In May 2015 she became an Officer of the National Order of Merit .
