= Agrégation d'histoire =

French competitive examination for the recruitment of professors of history

The agrégation externe d'histoire is a French competitive examination for the recruitment of associate professors who teach history or geography at the collège, or lycée level. There is also an agrégation externe de géographie and the agrégation interne d'histoire et géographie. In practice, though not an absolute requirement, it is often used as a selection criterion for teaching history in the CPGE and in higher education.

Since 2010, it has been necessary to have a master's degree to take this exam, one of the most attractive and selective literary agrégations and remains de facto required to teach history in Classe préparatoire aux grandes écoles or at university.

== History ==
The agrégation d'histoire et de géographie was created in 1831. The division of agrégations between the two disciplines was established under the influence of the geographer Emmanuel de Martonne and with the agreement of the minister, the historian and antiquarian Jérôme Carcopino, in 1941 (decree and order of 28 April) then definitively ratified by the order of 28 September 1943: "an agrégation in history and an agrégation in geography shall be instituted".

== Structure of the examinations ==
- Qualifying examinations (written):

Examination	Period	Weighting
1. Dissertation on history	7 h	1
2. Dissertation on history	7 h	1
3. Commentary on a historical text	7 h	1
4. Dissertation on geography	7 h	1

Each of the history written tests must deal with a different historical period. These two essays are given in chronological order: if medieval history, for example, is the subject of the first essay, the second essay will automatically deal with the question on modern history or contemporary history (but not ancient history, which may be given as a commentary).

- Practical and oral exams:

Examination	Preparation time	Period of exam	Weighting
1. General history lecture ("off curriculum")	6 h	1 h lecture: 0 h 30 interview: 0 h 30	2
2. Commentary on a historical text	6 h	1 h lecture: 0 h 30 interview: 0 h 30	2
3. Interpretation of a map and/or geographical documents	6 h	1 h presentation: 0 h 30 interview: 0 h 30	2

== Programme questions ==
In history, two out of four of the questions are renewed each year, with each question remaining on the curriculum for two years. In geography, one question on France is included every year, while the other question changes. Since 2008, the question on France has been topical.

=== 2023 Programme ===
History questions:

- Ancient: The Greek world and the East from 404 to 200 BC;
- Medieval: Cities and state building in North-Western Europe from the 13th to the 15th century (Empire, former Netherlands, France, England);
- (new question) Modern: Communities and mobilities in the Mediterranean from the end of the 15th century to the mid-18th century;
- (new question) Contemporary: African societies and the world: a connected history (1900-1980).

Geography questions:

- Thematic geography: Latin America;
- (new question) Geography of territories: Populations, settlement and territories in France.

=== 2022 Programme ===
History questions:

- (new question) Ancient: The Greek world and the East from 404 to 200 BC;
- (new question) Medieval: Cities and state building in North-Western Europe from the 13th to the 15th century (Empire, former Netherlands, France, England);
- Modern: The world of print in Western Europe (ca. 1470 - ca. 1680);
- Contemporary: Labour in Western Europe from the 1830s to the 1930s. Craft and industrial labour, practices and social issues.

Geography questions:

- (new question) Thematic geography: Borders;
- Geography of territories: Populations, settlement and territories in France.

=== 2021 Programme ===
History questions:

- Ancient: Religion and power in the Roman world from 218 BCE to 235 CE
- Medieval: Writing, power and society in the West from the beginning of the 12th century to the end of the 14th century (England, France, Italian Peninsula, Iberian Peninsula)
- (new question) modern: The world of print in Western Europe (ca. 1470 - ca. 1680)
- (new question) contemporary: Labour in Western Europe from the 1830s to the 1930s. Craft and industrial labour, practices and social issues

Geography questions:

- Geography of territories: Rural areas in France
- (new question) Thematic geography: Borders

The subjects for 2021 were: medieval history: 'Stability and precariousness of the written word', contemporary history: 'Being a worker', explanation of texts in modern history: 'Un mémoire sur les continuations de privilèges (vers 1670)' by Antoine Vitré (159?-1674) and geography of territories: 'Paysages et recompositions des espaces ruraux en France'.

The 2021 session was affected by the COVID-19 pandemic due to mandatory distancing and wearing of masks within examination centres by all candidates, during written and oral tests. Oral admission tests were not attended by the public for the 2021 session. 150 candidates were eligible.

=== 2020 Programme ===
This session was notable for the absence of oral tests due to the COVID-19 pandemic. The written eligibility tests were considered valid as admission tests. They were organised from 22 to 25 June 2020 instead of March.

History questions

- (new question) Ancient: Religion and power in the Roman world from 218 BCE to 235 CE;
- (new question) medieval: Writing, power and society in the West from the early 12th to the late 14th century (England, France, Italian peninsula, Iberian peninsula);
- modern: State, powers and disputes in the French and British monarchies and their American colonies (ca. 1640 - ca. 1780);
- contemporary: Culture, media, powers in the United States and Western Europe 1945 - 1991.

Geography questions:

- (new question) thematic geography: South-East Asia;
- Geography of territories: Rural areas in France

The 2020 topics are: Ancient History composition: "Piety and Impiety in Public Religion"., contemporary history composition: "the 1968s: culture and protest" interpretation of medieval history texts: "The books of a Dominican friar in the 13th century on 17 June 1287" and composition of the geography of territories: "Natural risks and territories in South-East Asia".

== Success rates ==
Statistics for the agrégation d'histoire (2003-2021)
	Enrolled	Not eliminated	Admissible	Admitted
2023	797	470 (58.9%)	169 (36%)	83 (10.4%)
2022	920	494 (53.2%)	156 (31.5%)	74 (7.4%)
2021	1251	639 (51.5%)	150 (23.5%)	73 (11.4%)
2020	1314	606 (46.12%)	None	73 (12.5%)
2019	1 352	638 (47.2%)	159 (24.9%)	72 (11.28%)
2018	1 467	679 (46%)	152 (22.4%)	72 (10.31%)
2017	1 599	735 (46%)	180 (24.5%)	90 (12.24%)
2016	1 677	817 (49%)	189 (23%)	96 (11.75%)
2015	1 502	714 (47.5%)	185 (26%)	91 (12.7%)
2014	1 569	747 (47%)	164 (22%)	80 (10.7%)
2013	1 937	748 (39%)	198 (26.5%)	100 (12.5%)
2012	1 692	644 (38%)	145 (23%)	70 (10.9%)
2011	1 654	561 (34%)	143 (25%)	71 (12.7%)
2010	2 113	1 051 (50%)	165 (16%)	84 (8%)
2009	2 309	1 234 (53%)	172 (14%)	84 (6.8%)
2008	2 624	1 398 (53%)	193 (14%)	83 (5.9%)
2007	2 721	1 389 (51%)	199 (14%)	92 (6.6%)
2006	2 989	1 575 (53%)	208 (13%)	92 (5.8%)
2005	3 118	1 788 (57%)	254 (14%)	128 (7.2%)
2004	3 049	1 763 (58%)	238 (13.5%)	115 (6.5%)
2003	3 061	1 770 (58%)	269 (15%)	134 (7.6%)

Between 2003 and 2009, the number of successful candidates decreased by 30%, without offsetting the decrease in the number of posts (-37% over the period). From year to year, the competition has become more and more selective: since 2005, the real admission rate has never exceeded 7%, and from 2003 to 2010 (except in 2007), the percentage of admitted candidates compared to those not eliminated was lower than that of the agrégation de philosophie. In 2011, following a sharp drop in the number of candidates not eliminated, the agrégation in history became less selective than that in philosophy.

The success rate varies greatly from one academy to another. It is exceptionally high in the academies of Créteil-Paris-Versailles and Lyon because of the presence of the École Normale Supérieure of rue d'Ulm, Lyon, Cachan (students from the latter benefiting from the preparation offered by rue d'Ulm), the École des Chartes, and renowned faculties such as Paris-I and Paris-IV.

== Historians' views on the agrégation d'histoire ==
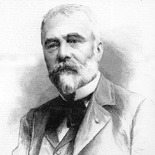
Ernest Lavisse

In 1883, Ernest Lavisse, speaking to Parisian students, said:

"The agrégation will not require of those of you who choose the history of antiquity the slightest notion of epigraphy or archaeology; nor will it require of those who choose the history of the Middle Ages the slightest notion of palaeography or diplomacy or medieval philology [...] and all that you will not be asked for will be indispensable."

In 1888, Ernest Denis, who was to hold the chair of modern history at the Sorbonne, and who was himself an agrégé, said of the agrégation that "there is only one way to improve it, and that is to abolish it!" - what Jacques Le Goff described in 1966 as "words that are, alas, still relevant and likely to remain so". In 1892, it was Ferdinand Lot (who was chartered, not an agrégé and ended his career as a professor of medieval history at the Sorbonne) who judged "that the agrégation is an evil institution which, more than any other, has contributed to our scientific degradation, that it is a gnawing canker which devours the intelligence of teachers and students."

== Controversy at the 2011 session ==
The agrégation d'histoire received unusual amount of attention from the general public in 2011: the text given for the historical commentary test was presented as an authentic medieval text written in the 15th century, when in fact it was a fictionalized reconstruction of Palémon Glorieux, published in 1964. The two historians behind the subject, Catherine Vincent and Denyse Riche, resigned from the jury after their error was revealed by the French media. The Ministry of Education officially took a position by announcing that this error, although not in line with the required scientific rigour, did not lead to the cancellation of the test since the principle of equality between candidates had not been violated.

== Famous winners ==
Famous recipients of the agrégation in history-geography and later in history include:

- Alexandre Adler (1974)
- Maurice Agulhon (1950)
- Lucie Aubrac (1938)
- Alfred Baudrillart (1881)
- François Bédarida (1949)
- Alain Besançon (1957)
- Georges Bidault (1925)
- Marc Bloch (1908)
- François Bluche (1950)
- Fernand Braudel (1922)
- Jérôme Carcopino (1904)
- Pierre Chaunu (1947)
- Suzanne Citron (1946)
- Philippe Contamine (1956)
- Joël Cornette (1974)
- Denis Crouzet (1976)
- Élisabeth Crouzet-Pavan (1976)
- Daniel-Rops (1922)
- Jean Delumeau (1947)
- Albert Demangeon (1895)
- Georges Duby (1942)
- Jacques Droz (1932)
- Jacques Dupâquier (1949)
- Jean-Baptiste Duroselle (1943)
- Victor Duruy (1833)
- Jean Favier (1959)
- Lucien Febvre (1902)
- Robert Fossier (1953)
- François Furet (1954)
- Max Gallo (1960)
- Benoît Garnot (1976)
- Pierre Gaxotte (1920)
- Pierre George (1930)
- Raoul Girardet (1944)
- Jacques Godechot (1928)
- Pierre Goubert (1948)
- Julien Gracq (1934)
- Jules Isaac (1902)
- Jean Jacquart (1951)
- Jean-Noël Jeanneney (1965)
- Louis Joxe (1925)
- Camille Jullian (1880)
- Dominique Kalifa (1981)
- Roger Karoutchi (1974)
- André Kaspi (1961)
- Annie Kriegel (1948)
- Michel Labrousse (1935)
- Mathilde Larrère (1994)
- Henry Laurens (1980)
- Ernest Lavisse (1865)
- Marc Lazar (1979)
- Stéphane Lebecq (1969)
- François Lebrun (1956)
- Georges Lefebvre (1898)
- Jacques Le Goff (1950)
- Emmanuel Le Roy Ladurie (1953)
- Robert Mandrou (1950)
- Henri-Irénée Marrou (1929)
- Jacques Marseille (1969)
- Emmanuel de Martonne (1895)
- Roland Marx (1956)
- Albert Mathiez (1897)
- Pierre Miquel (1955)
- Claude Mossé (1944)
- Robert Muchembled (1967)
- Pierre Nora (1958)
- Jacques Ozouf (1954)
- Jean Poperen (1947)
- Antoine Prost (1957)
- Madeleine Rebérioux (1945)
- Jean-Pierre Rioux (1964)
- Romain Rolland (1889)
- Henry Rousso (1977)
- Maurice Sartre (1968)
- Annie Sartre-Fauriat (1973)
- Charles Seignobos (1877)
- Jean-François Sirinelli (1973)
- Albert Soboul (1938)
- Jean-René Suratteau (1945)
- Amédée Thalamas (1892)
- Albert Thibaudet (1908)
- Valérie Toureille (2000)
- Jean Tulard (1958)
- Maurice Vaïsse (1967)
- Jacques Verger (1966)
- Paul Vidal de La Blache (1866)
- Pierre Vidal-Naquet (1955)
- Laurent Wauquiez (1997)
- Olivier Wieviorka (1984)
- Michel Winock (1961)
- Laurent Wirth (1979)
