= Valérie Toureille =

French historian

- Born: 1967 (age 58–59); Île-de-France
- Awards: Prix d'histoire de la Chancellerie des universités de Paris (2001) Médaille de bronze des Antiquités de la France (2008); Member Ordre des Palmes académiques (2013) Prix d'Histoire de l'Académie Stanislas (2015)

Academic background
- Education: Paris 1 Panthéon-Sorbonne University
- Doctoral advisor: Claude Gauvard
- Other advisor: Robert Fossier

Academic work
- Discipline: Historian

Valérie Toureille is a French historian and university professor born in 1967 in Île-de-France. She is a specialist in the history of the Middle Ages as well as the crime, criminal gangs and criminal justice of the era.

== Biography ==
Valérie Toureille studied at the Tolbiac faculty, then at the Sorbonne, where she was a student of Robert Fossier. She has a degree in history, is a resident of the Thiers Foundation and has a doctorate in medieval history. She defended her thesis in December 2000 on the theme of crime at the end of the Middle Ages, prepared under the supervision of Claude Gauvard. She was awarded the Mariette Bénabou Prize for it in 2001 (a prize awarded by the Chancellerie des Universités de Paris). Since then, she has been a lecturer and professor at the University of Paris-Seine. In 2008, she was awarded the bronze medal of the Antiquités de la France (Inscriptions et Belles Lettres).

As a specialist in the area of crime, she combines historical approaches with those of law and sociology. She published a work examining medieval justice and society, Crime et châtiment au Moyen Âge (Crime and Punishment in the Middle Ages) in 2013.

For the past ten years, Toureille has focused on the phenomenon of violence in the aftermath of war and the de-socialisation of combatants, particularly those who fought in the Hundred Years War. Then, through the study of the war leader Robert de Sarrebrück, she sought to clarify the economy of a military venture in the first half of the 15th century in Lorraine. Her book, Robert de Sarrebrück ou l'honneur d'un Ecorcheur (Robert of Saarbrücken or the honour of a flenser) received the Prix d'Histoire de l'Académie Stanislas. She has reexamined the mythology of the coquillards, confronting stories of the legendary brigands with historical and social realities, in a series of articles.

In 2015, Valérie Toureille published a history of the Battle of Agincourt, which reflects on the aftermath of the battle awakening a patriotic will to resist in the French, which still forms a part of their national story. She also contributed to the catalogue of the exhibition on the same theme (Agincourt to Marignano) for the Army Museum, one of the museums at the Hôtel des Invalides. She directed the "Troyes-1420" exhibition as scientific curator, commemorating the 600th anniversary of the Treaty of Troyes in 2020. This was an agreement that King Henry V of England and his heirs would inherit the French throne upon the death of King Charles VI of France, a treaty intended to end the Hundred Years War. She also participated in creating the exhibition catalogue, Un roi pour deux couronnes (One king for two crowns).

== Publications ==
- Vol et brigandage au Moyen Âge. Le Nœud gordien (in French). Paris: Presses universitaires de France. 2006. p. 310. ISBN 2-13-053970-X..
- Crime et châtiment au Moyen Âge, V^{e} – XV^{e} siècle. L'Univers historique (in French). Paris: Éditions du Seuil. 2013. p. 328. ISBN 978-2-02-094466-3.
- Robert de Sarrebrück ou l'honneur d'un écorcheur (v. 1400-v. 1462). Histoire (in French). Rennes: Presses Universitaires de Rennes. 2014. p. 272. ISBN 978-2-7535-3477-3.
- Le drame d'Azincourt (in French). Paris: Albin Michel. 2015. p. 240. ISBN 978-2-226-31892-3.
- Jeanne d'Arc (in French). Paris: Perrin. 2020. p. 432. ISBN 978-2-262-06394-8..

=== Director of publication ===
- Pernot, François; Toureille, Valérie (2010). Lendemains de guerre... Cahiers du Collège d'Europe (in French). Bruxelles: P.I.E. Lang. p. 467. ISBN 978-90-5201-592-7..
- Baudin, Arnaud; Toureille, Valérie (2020). Troyes 1420. Histoire et patrimoine (in French). Gand/Troyes: Snoeck. p. 407. ISBN 978-94-6161-598-5.. [présentation en ligne].
- Être historien du Moyen Âge au XXI ème siècle, Actes du colloque de la SHMESP, Cergy; Évry; Marne-la-Vallée; Saint-Quentin-en-Yvelines, June 2007, Publications de la Sorbonne, in collaboration with E. Anheim, G. Thierry-Bürher, B. Laurioux, F. Masé et V. Theis, Paris, Publications de la Sorbonne, 2008.
- Lendemains de guerre. De l’Antiquité au XX e siècle, Proceedings of the October 2008 conference, Cergy-Pontoise, in collaboration with Fr. Pernot, Peter Lang ed, Brussels, April 2010.
- Les traités de partage du Moyen Âge au monde contemporain, 1st Journée d’histoire de la Roche-Guyon, in collaboration with Fr. Pernot, Paris, 2012.
- Guerre et société (1270-1480), V. Toureille (dir.), F. Berland, G. Butaud, S. Fourcade, V. Serdon, Paris, Atlande, February 2013.
- Un roi pour deux couronnes-Troyes 1420, exhibition catalogue in collaboration with A. Baudin and the Departmental Archives of Aube, Snoeck, Brussels, 2020.

== Distinctions ==
- Chevalière de l'ordre des Palmes académiques
