= Mathilde Larrère =

French historian (born 1970)

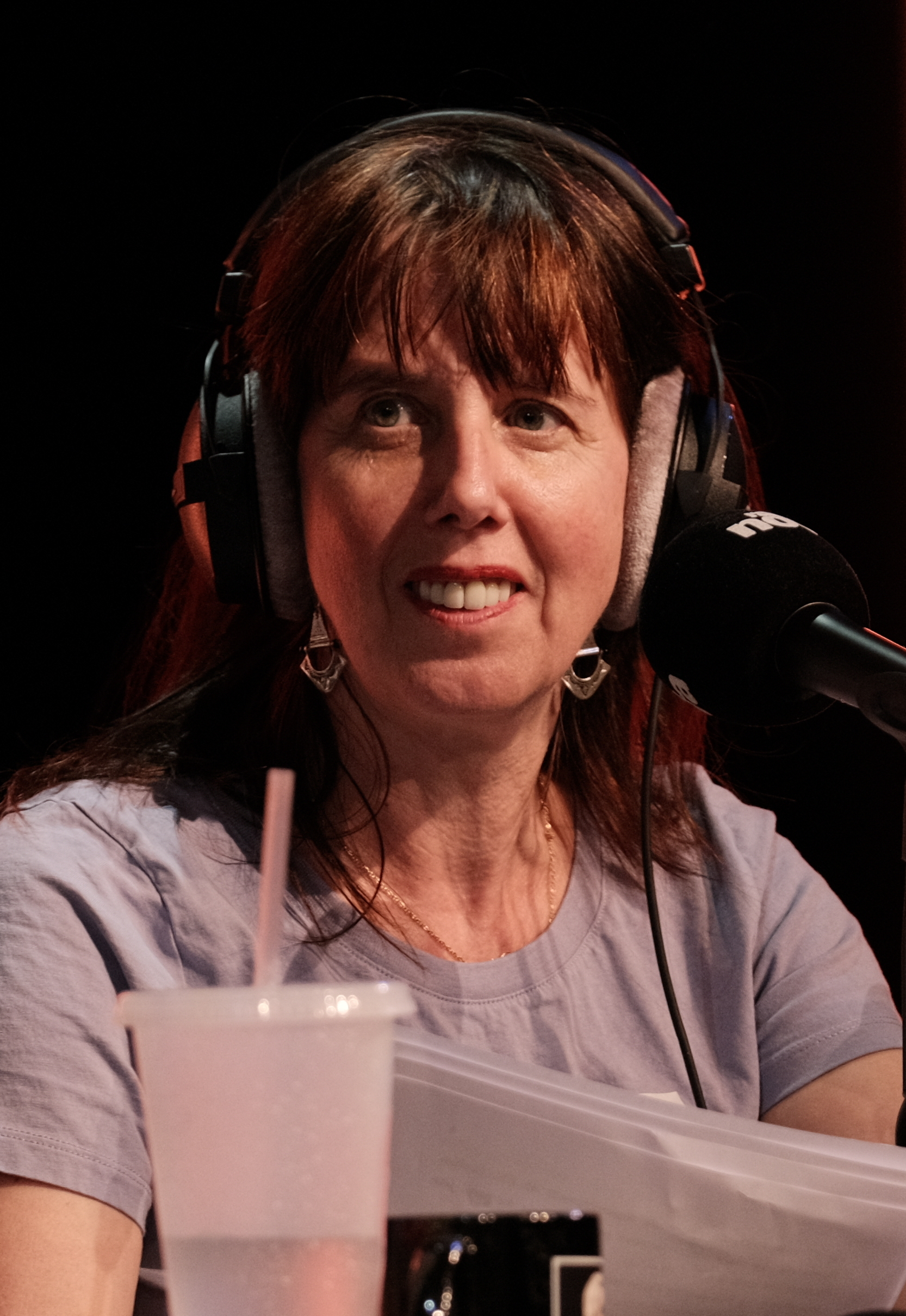
- Mathilde Larrère in 2026
- Born: October 19, 1970 (age 55); Paris
- Occupation: historian

Academic background
- Education: École normale supérieure de Fontenay-Saint-Cloud

Academic work
- Institutions: University of Paris-Est Marne-la-Vallée (since 2007) Sorbonne Paris North University (2002-2007)
- Main interests: 19th century revolutionary movements and policing in France

Mathilde Larrère (born in Paris, 19 October 1970) is a French historian and activist. She is a specialist in revolutionary movements and policing in 19th century France.

== Biography ==
=== Background and training ===
She is the daughter of Raphaël Larrère, an agricultural engineer, and Catherine Larrère, a philosopher. Mathilde Larrère is a former student of the École normale supérieure de Fontenay-Saint-Cloud (class of 1991). She won the agrégation d'histoire in 1994. She was awarded a PhD in history (2000) on defending her thesis, "The Paris National Guard under the July Monarchy, power at the end of the rifle?", completed under the direction of Alain Corbin. She has also taken courses as an auditor at the École pratique des hautes études.

=== Career ===
Her research focuses on the history of citizenship, the history of the relationship between citizens and the state, the history of policing, and more particularly on the history of the July revolution in 1830. Larrère volunteered in the Paris national guard, a unit of the National Guard (France) in charge of local public order. Finding herself on both sides of the barricades depending on events, she was prompted to reflect on public order, on the policies for maintaining it, in a politically troubled and socially agitated context - a task which also led her to reflect on public "disorder". Used by both the government and the opposition, the national guard seems to her to be a good observatory of citizenship lived by people. She researches this via political uses of the Parisian space in the 19th century. In 2017 and 2018, she was a columnist on the websites Arrêt sur images and Mediapart co-writing a column entitled "Les détricoteuses" with Laurence De Cock.

She is a member of Comité d'histoire de la ville de Paris, a consultative committee with the power to make proposals to the city of Paris, composed of 49 academics, researchers and representatives of major institutions working on its history.

She asserts a politicised approach to history, saying: "You don't say false things because you have a politicised approach, as long as you are scientifically sound and don't betray the sources. I'm showing my colours." ("On ne raconte pas des choses fausses parce qu’il y a une approche politisée, à partir du moment où on est solide scientifiquement et qu’on ne trahit pas les sources. Moi j’affiche la couleur").

She also rejects the concept of neutrality in history: "To say that history is neutral is a great scam to pass off right-wing history" ("Dire que l'histoire est neutre, c’est une grande arnaque pour faire passer une histoire de droite"). She was a member of the Comité de vigilance face aux usages publics de l'histoire (CVUH). The CVUH is an association of historians founded to monitor the public use of history for collective memory purposes, particularly by politicians.

She joined the social network Twitter in 2013, where she posts historical ephemera in the form of "mini-courses". and gained notoriety by criticising some of Manuel Valls' positions, Nicolas Sarkozy, François Fillon, Jean-Luc Mélenchon and Emmanuel Macron concerning various aspects of French history such as colonisation or the Ordinance of Villers-Cotterêts.

=== Politics and trade unions ===
Mathilde Larrère joined the Left Party in 2012. During the 2014 municipal elections in Paris, she was a candidate on the Left Party list of the 12th arrondissement. She left the party in January 2016, after "political disagreements".

She co-founded a collective that wanted to renew the left, Le Temps des Lilas, and participated in the Nuit debout movement.

She is a member of the lecturer's branch of the left-wing public officials' union, FSU (Fédération Syndicale Unitaire), SNESUP-FSU.

She was one of the first signatories calling for the demonstration against Islamophobia on 10 November 2019.

In the 2022 presidential election, she supported Jean-Luc Mélenchon, then indicated that she would vote against Marine Le Pen in the second round. In May 2022, she joined the parliament of the New Ecological and Social People's Union.

== Publications ==
- 2013 Révolutions. (Director of publication) ISBN 978-2-7011-6275-1
- 2016 L'urne et le fusil. ISBN 978-2-13-062168-3
- 2018 Des intrus en politique : femmes et minorités, dominations et résistances (with Aude Lorriaux) ISBN 979-10-97079-28-4
- 2019 L'histoire comme émancipation (with Laurence de Cock and Guillaume Mazeau) ISBN 978-2-7489-0395-9
- 2019 Il était une fois les révolutions ISBN 979-10-97079-46-8
- 2020 Manifs et stations : le métro des militant·e·s (with Laurence de Cock) ISBN 978-2-7082-4619-5
- 2021 Rage against the machisme ISBN 979-10-97079-63-5
- 2022 Guns and Roses ISBN 979-10-97079-63-5
- 2022 Le Puy du Faux - Enquête sur un parc qui déforme l'histoire ISBN 979-1037505903

== Documentary interviews ==
- 2017 L'Histoire nous le dira (Laurent Turcot)
- 2019 Nota Bonus (1 episode)
- 2019 Le grand procès de Macron (dir. Jonathan Duong)
- 2020 The Monopoly of Violence
