= Bronwyn Hayward =

New Zealand political scientist

Bronwyn Hayward MNZM FRSNZ
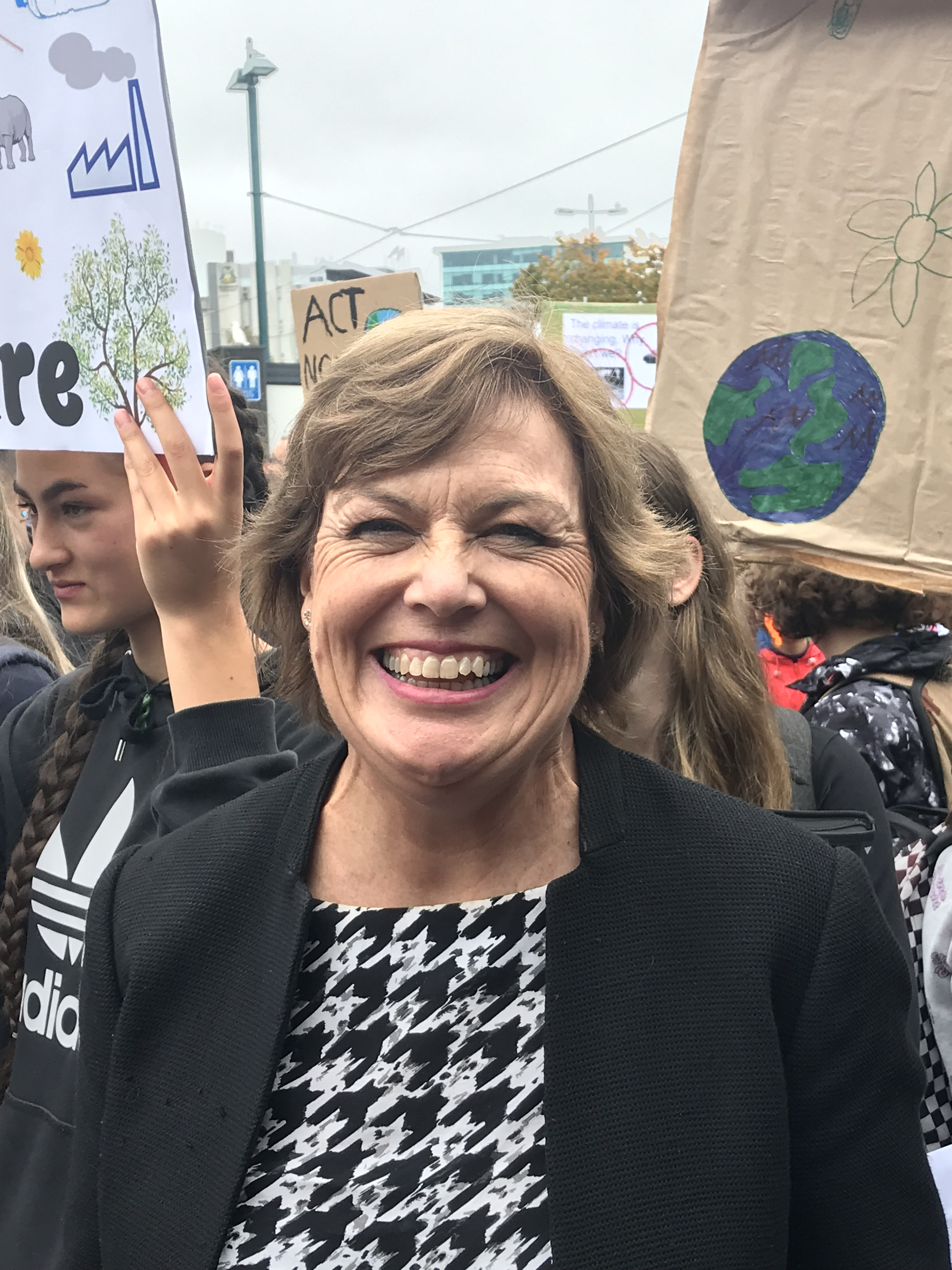
- Hayward in 2019

Academic background
- Education: University of Otago
- Doctoral advisors: Ali Memon, Paul Harris

Bronwyn Mary Hayward MNZM FRSNZ is a New Zealand political scientist. Her areas of research are democracy, sustainability and young people. She was a lead author on a United Nations' Intergovernmental Panel on Climate Change Special Report.

== Biography ==
Hayward was born and raised in Christchurch, New Zealand. She attended Christchurch Girls' High School and then moved to Dunedin to study at the University of Otago. She completed bachelor's, master's and doctorate degrees in political science and geography at Otago.

Hayward has been Senior Visiting Fellow with the Sustainable Lives Research Group (University of Surrey) and from 2008 to 2011 was a visiting fellow at the Tyndall Centre for climate change research in East Anglia. She was a co-researcher at the University of Oslo on the Voices of the Future project, a study of young people growing up in a changing climate. She is also a Co-Primary Investigator for the Centre for the Understanding of Sustainable Prosperity, University of Surrey, UK (2016-2020).

Hayward is a professor in the Department of Political Science and International Relations at the University of Canterbury. She is also director of the university's Sustainable Citizenship and Civic Imagination: Hei Puāwaitanga research group.

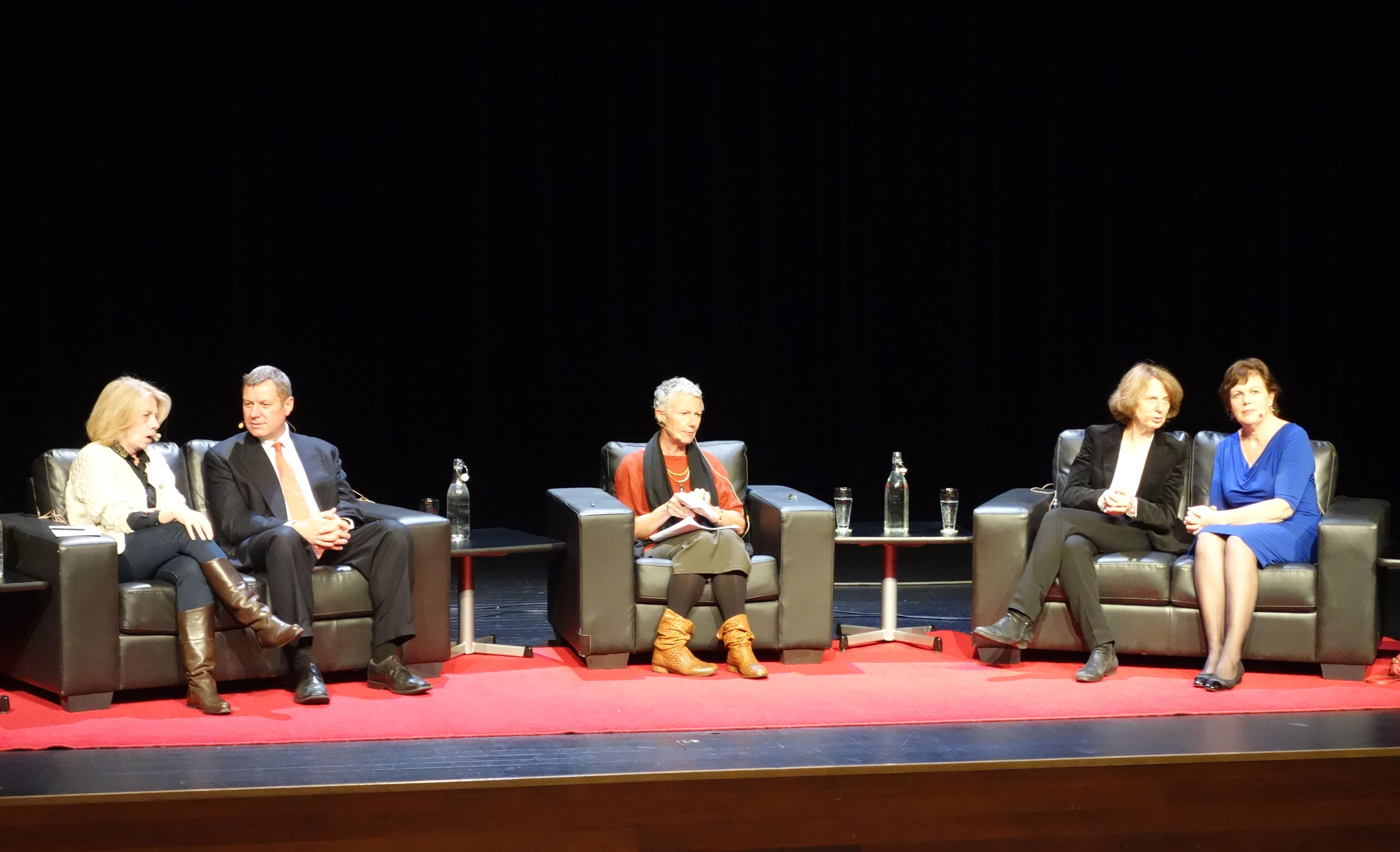
Discussion on the Anthropocene challenge in 2015. From left to right: Lucile Schmid, Prof David Frame, Kim Hill, Prof. Catherine Larrère and Bronwyn Hayward.

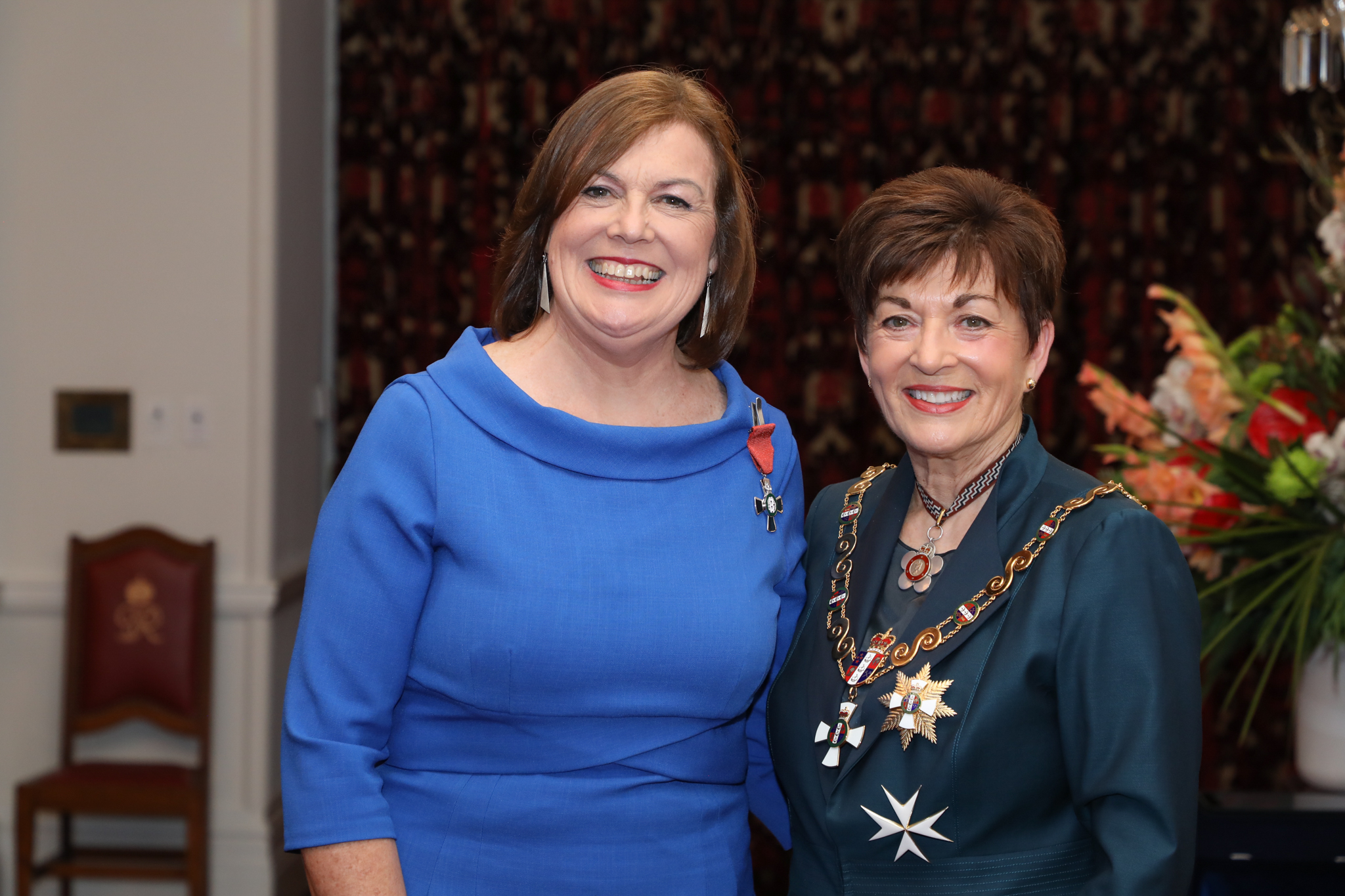
Hayward (left), after her investiture as a Member of the New Zealand Order of Merit by the governor-general, Dame Patsy Reddy, at Government House, Wellington, on 6 May 2021

Hayward is considered a world expert on sustainability and youth politics. She was a lead author on UN's Intergovernmental Panel on Climate Change Special Report on the impacts of global warming of 1.5 °C. In the 2021 New Year Honours, Hayward was appointed a Member of the New Zealand Order of Merit, for services to political science, particularly sustainability, climate change and youth. She was elected a Fellow of the Royal Society of New Zealand in 2022.

== Bibliography ==
- Hayward BM. (2017) Sea Change: Climate Politics and New Zealand. BWB Bridget Williams Books. 120. http://dx.doi.org/10.7810/9781988533285.
- Hayward B. (2012) Children, citizenship and environment: Nurturing a democratic imagination in a changing world.1–190. 10.4324/9780203106839.
- Hayward BM., Collins R. and Nissen SE. (2017) Children and Environment. In Demeritt D; Castree N; Richardson D (Ed.), International Encyclopaedia of Geography: People, the Earth, Environment and Technology: 7. London: Wiley. http://dx.doi.org/10.1002/9781118786352.wbieg0371.
- Hayward B., Collins R. and Nissen S. (2016) Children and Environment. In Demeritt D; Castree N; Richardson D (Ed.), The International Encyclopaedia of Geography: forthcoming. London: Wiley.
- Nissen SE. and Hayward BM. (2016) Student associations: The New Zealand experience. In Brooks R (Ed.), Student Politics and Protest: International perspectives: 129–142. Routledge.
