= Société de l'histoire de France =

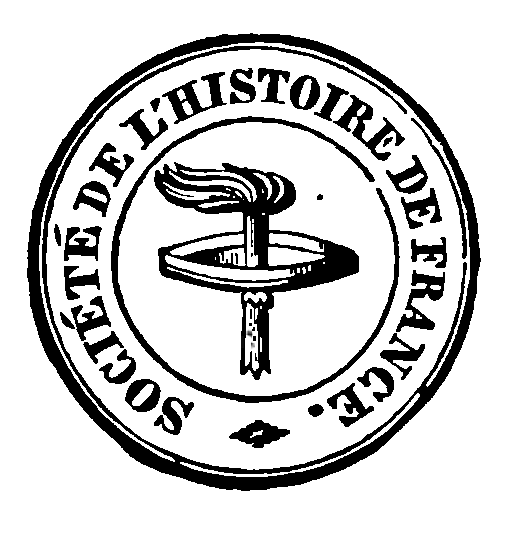
SHF Logo

The Société de l'histoire de France (SHF) (English: Society of the History of France) was established on 21 December 1833 at the instigation of the French minister of Public Instruction, François Guizot, in order to contribute to the renewal of historical scholarship fuelled by a widespread interest in national history, typical of the Romantic period. On 31 July 1851 it was approved by President Louis-Napoléon Bonaparte as being of public interest. For over 175 years, the SHF has been one of the main forces in the publishing of texts and documents on French history. Many leading French historians of the 19th and 20th centuries have been elected to its annual presidency. Its field was initially limited to the period before 1789, but the SHF later absorbed the Société d'histoire contemporaine (1927).

Its series of critical editions and its periodicals (Bulletin and Annuaire, combined since 1863 under the title Annuaire-Bulletin de la Société de l'histoire de France ABSHF) amount to over 500 volumes, containing considerable historical source material: mainly chronicles, memoirs, journals and letters, but also other documents such as financial or judicial records. A large proportion of all volumes published up to 1940 are now freely accessible online, through the digital library of the Bibliothèque nationale de France, Gallica, and Google Books.

The SHF gathers twice a year for a lecture on a historical subject and, on occasions, holds conferences for a wider audience.

Membership is open to both professional historians and serious amateurs interested in supporting and taking part in the activities of the SHF.

Among other resources, the SHF website provides the complete catalogue of publications (with links to all titles available for reading or buying online) and a general index of articles and documents published in the Annuaire-Bulletin from 1911 to the present.

The Current President is Claude Gauvard

== See also ==
- Comité des travaux historiques et scientifiques
