= Suzanne Citron =

French historian (1922–2018)

- Born: Suzanne Antoinette Grumbach; July 15, 1922; Ars-sur-Moselle
- Died: January 22, 2018 (aged 95); 4th arrondissement of Paris
- Resting place: Montjustin
- Occupations: Essayist, historian, resistance fighter
- Spouse: Pierre Citron
- Awards: Chevalier de la Légion d'honneur (1999)

Academic background
- Education: Paris Nanterre University (PhD) (until 1974) Lycée Molière

Academic work
- Discipline: Historian
- Institutions: Sorbonne Paris North University
- Notable works: Le Mythe national. L’histoire de France en question
- Website: suzannecitron.wordpress.com

Suzanne Citron, born Suzanne Grumbach on 15 July 1922 in Ars-sur-Moselle and died on 22 January 2018 in the 4th arrondissement of Paris, was a French historian and essayist of the left.

She is known for her work on the national myth and the teaching of history in France.

== Biography ==
Suzanne Citron was born into a bourgeois Jewish family with Alsatian, Parisian and Portuguese roots. Both her grandfathers received the Legion of Honour: on her father's side, Paul Grumbach (1861–1931), who was a brigadier general, and, on her mother's side, Eugène Dreyfus (1864–1936), a magistrate who was President of the Paris Court of Appeal. She spoke of a "family that considered itself Franco-Israelite, order being important" ("famille qui se considérait comme franco-israélite, l'ordre étant important"). She was brought up in a secular and patriotic environment, with her father often referring to the Dreyfus Affair.

She studied at the Lycée Molière in Paris. At the beginning of the Second World War, her father was imprisoned in Germany. During the Occupation, after the arrest of two of her cousins during a raid, she clandestinely crossed the demarcation line on 15 July 1941 into the free zone. She studied history and was active in the resistance.

She was arrested in Lyon on 25 June 1944 by the Gestapo and lived through the last weeks of the Drancy internment camp, the camp being liberated by the Allied advance before her deportation to Germany.

She was an agrégée d'histoire (1947) and taught for about twenty years at the lycée in Enghien-les-Bains.

During the Algerian war, which she defined as "a second internal shock", she was revolted by the special powers voted at the initiative of Guy Mollet's socialist government in 1956. She then became an anti-colonial activist.

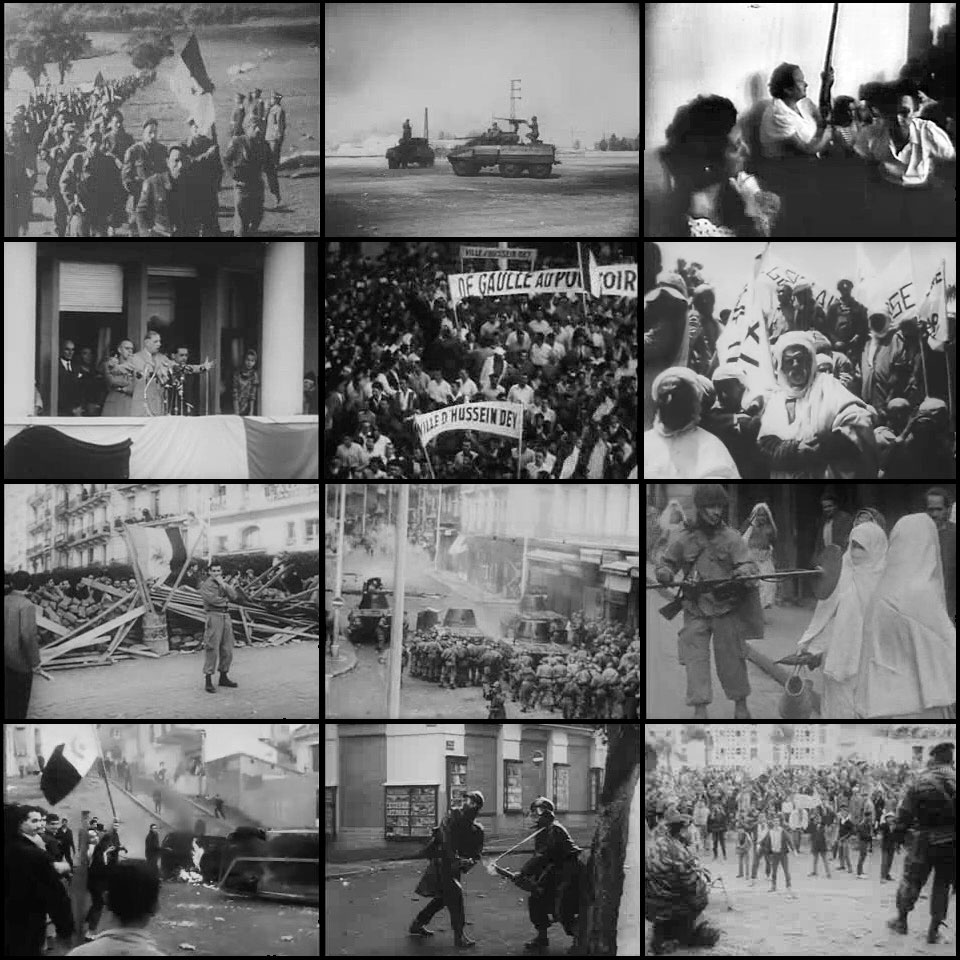
Algerian war

She then turned to the history of French colonialism: the story of the conquest of Algeria, the repression in Indochina in the 1930s and the massacres in Madagascar in 1947. As a result of her discovery that these facts were obscured in the national narrative, she became very critical of the teaching of French history. Shortly after May 1968, she published an article in Le Monde, entitled "Ce que nous attendons du ministère de l'éducation" (What we expect from the Ministry of Education) in which she outlined a reorganisation and decompartmentalisation of schooling. She expanded on her ideas in her book L'École bloquée (The stalled school), published in 1971.

She obtained a doctorate in contemporary history from the Paris Nanterre University in 1974. Her doctoral thesis, defended in 1974 but not published, is entitled Aux origines de la Société des professeurs d'histoire: la réforme de 1902 et le développement du corporatisme dans l'enseignement secondaire (1902-1914). She then taught at the University of Paris XIII-Villetaneuse.

She was an activist in the educational movements of the 1960s-1970s for the renovation of teaching content and published numerous articles in various teachers' magazines on the problems of secondary education. She published "points of view" for over thirty years in Le Monde and ten years in Libération.

She was a member of the Unified Socialist Party (PSU). From 1977 to 1983, she was deputy mayor of Domont (Val-d'Oise). She left the Socialist Party in 1985 and reproached the Minister of National Education, Jean-Pierre Chevènement, for having re-established a national history that placed France at the centre of the world.

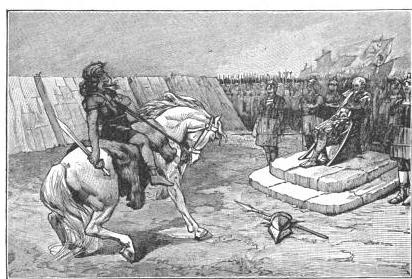
Illustration of an encounter between Vercingetorix and Julius Caesar from Lavisse's Histoire de France, cours élémentaire

In 1987, she published the book that will remain associated with her name, Le Mythe National, a work deconstructing history as it was taught at the time. This book went through several editions. In the last, which dates from 2017, it recognised the progress made in the teaching of history in France over the previous thirty years, with the appearance of a critical history of the Vichy regime, teaching about the Algerian war, of colonisation and that the history of immigration to France is now discussed in the public arena. But she continued to denounce its matrix, namely, Histoire de France, cours élémentaire (Elementary course in French history) known as the "petit Lavisse", a textbook for schools during the Third Republic.

This latest edition received a lot of media exposure during the campaign for the 2017 French presidential election. On the set of L'Émission politique on 24 March, the left-wing historian Laurence De Cock offered a copy to François Fillon, who advocated a return to the national narrative in his political campaign. The title sold out shortly after on the online retailer Amazon.

Suzanne Citron was also a member of the Comité de vigilance face aux usages publics de l'histoire (CVUH), an association of historians founded to monitor the public use of history for collective memory purposes, particularly by politicians.

She died in Paris on 22 January 2018 at the age of 95 and was buried alongside her husband in Montjustin.

== Statement of position ==
In July 2017, in an article published on the website of the daily newspaper Le Monde and entitled "By inviting Netanyahu, Emmanuel Macron is instrumentalizing French history", Suzanne Citron criticized what she considered to be Emmanuel Macron's instrumentalization of French history, guilty, in her opinion, of fuelling confusion about French history by inviting the Israeli Prime Minister to the commemoration of the Vél' d'Hiv roundup.

Her position, set out in three paragraphs, continued as follows: "Interned at Drancy on 4 July 1944 and liberated by the events of 17 August 1944, I formally deny any justification for the presence of a man who condones the exactions and misdeeds of Israeli colonisation in Palestine, and I reject the endless and demagogic confusion between antisemitism and criticism of the State of Israel" ("Internée à Drancy le 4 juillet 1944 et libérée par les événements du 17 août 1944, je dénie formellement toute justification à la présence d’un homme cautionnant les exactions et les méfaits de la colonisation israélienne en Palestine et je récuse la sempiternelle et démagogique confusion entre antisémitisme et critique de l’État d’Israël").

== Private life ==
She was the wife of the French literary historian and musicologist Pierre Citron (1919–2010).

== Publications ==
- L'École bloquée, Bordas, 1971.
- Enseigner l’histoire aujourd'hui : la mémoire perdue et retrouvée, Les Éditions ouvrières, 1984.
- Le Mythe national : l'Histoire de France en question, Les Éditions ouvrières, 1987.
- Le Bicentenaire et ces îles que l'on dit françaises, Syllepse, 1989.
- L'Histoire de France autrement, Les Éditions de l'Atelier, 1992; 2nd ed. 1995.
- L'Histoire des hommes, Syros jeunesse, 1996; new updated edition 1999, digital version 2015 (« L'histoire des hommes, racontée par Suzanne Citron », on www.chalifour.fr (pdf, 340 MB)).
- Mes lignes de démarcation : croyances, utopies, engagements, Syllepse, 2003.
- Le Mythe national : l'Histoire de France revisitée, Les Éditions de l'Atelier/Les Éditions ouvrières (pocket), 2008 (updated 1987 edition); new edition 2017.

== Distinctions ==
- Chevalier de la Légion d'honneur
