= Kim Hill (broadcaster) =

New Zealand broadcaster

Kim Hill CRSNZ
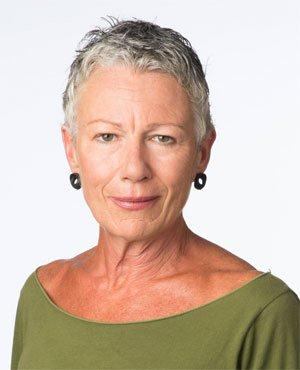
- Born: Fiona Anderson Hill; 14 July 1955 (age 71); Shrewsbury, Shropshire, England
- Occupation: Broadcaster

Fiona Anderson Kim Hill CRSNZ (born 14 July 1955) is a New Zealand broadcaster who presented the programme Saturday Morning on Radio New Zealand National, a public radio station, between 2002 and 2023. She was named International Radio Personality of the Year in 2012.

== Early life ==
Hill was born Fiona Anderson Hill on 14 July 1955 in Shrewsbury, Shropshire, England. Her father was a veterinarian and her mother was a physiotherapist and nurse. When Hill was 15, her family migrated to New Zealand. Hill gained a Bachelor of Arts degree in French and German at Massey University and the University of Otago. She then studied journalism at the University of Canterbury's Postgraduate School of Journalism.

Hill was granted New Zealand citizenship in 1981.

== Journalism and broadcasting career ==
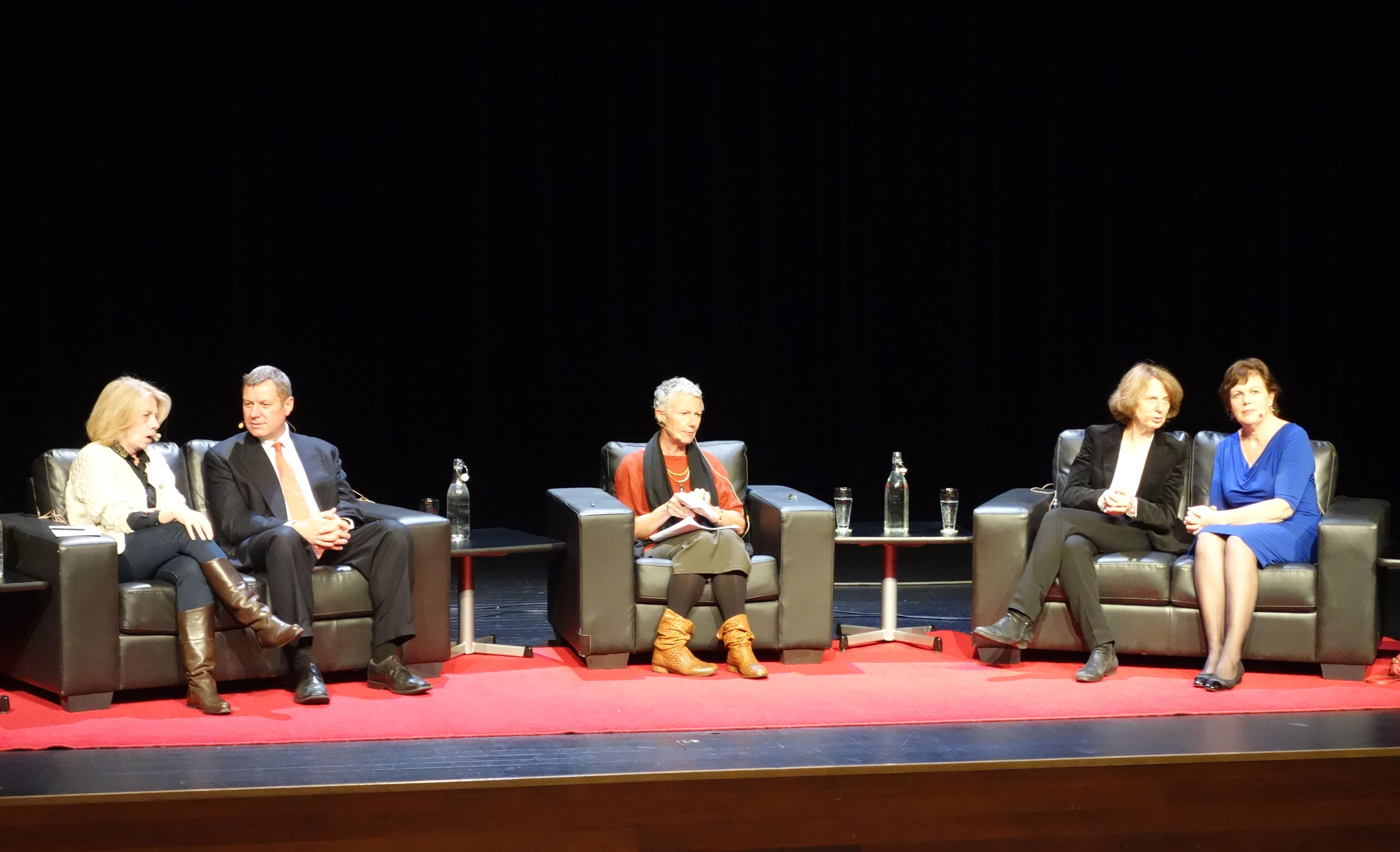
Kim Hill (centre) chairing a panel discussion on the Anthropocene challenge. From left to right: Lucile Schmid, Professor David Frame, Kim Hill, Professor Catherine Larrère and Bronwyn Hayward.

Hill's early career included stints working for radio and newspapers in Nelson, Greymouth and Gisborne, before moving to Radio New Zealand in Wellington and starting on the programme Checkpoint. From 1993 to 2002 she was the host of the daily morning Nine to Noon programme. Notable interviews from this time included the Dalai Lama, Nelson Mandela, Jeffrey Archer, and Monica Lewinsky.

In April 2002, Hill began hosting Saturday Morning. Since the 1990s she has also worked in television (on the consumer affairs show Fair Go and news programme Counterpoint, both with TVNZ's TV ONE) and in 2003 she began hosting the interview programme Face to Face With Kim Hill.

In 2003, Hill interviewed journalist John Pilger who complained that Hill had not researched properly: "You waste my time because you have not prepared for this interview, as any journalist does, and I've done many interviews. The one thing is to prepare for them and this interview, frankly, is a disgrace." Referring to the Australian journalist in 2012 she said, "The thing is, if Pilger wasn’t an egomaniac, he wouldn’t have done the work he’s done. I was keen to talk to him, but he turns out to be a prick. So it goes."

In 2006, Hill hosted Are Angels OK, a series of programmes where artists, writers, and physicists discussed the intersection between physics and the arts. Her monthly radio conversations between 2004 and 2007 with physicist Paul Callaghan were published as As Far As We Know.

In September 2023, it was announced that Hill would stop hosting Saturday Morning, with her final show on 25 November.

== Awards ==
In 2000, Hill was awarded a Bravo award by the New Zealand Skeptics for her interview of John Read, Director of Scientific Affairs of the New Zealand Psychological Society on National Radio. In 2012, Hill was named International Radio Personality of the Year by the Association for International Broadcasting. The judges described her as "an experienced and warm broadcaster exercising full control of her content, whilst coaxing her guests to reveal more of themselves; really enjoyable live and sparky content that demonstrates what is great about radio, and illustrates how important lightness of touch is in speech content". In 2017, Hill was awarded a Gold Radio Award for Best Radio Personality: Network/Syndicated at the International Radio Program Awards.

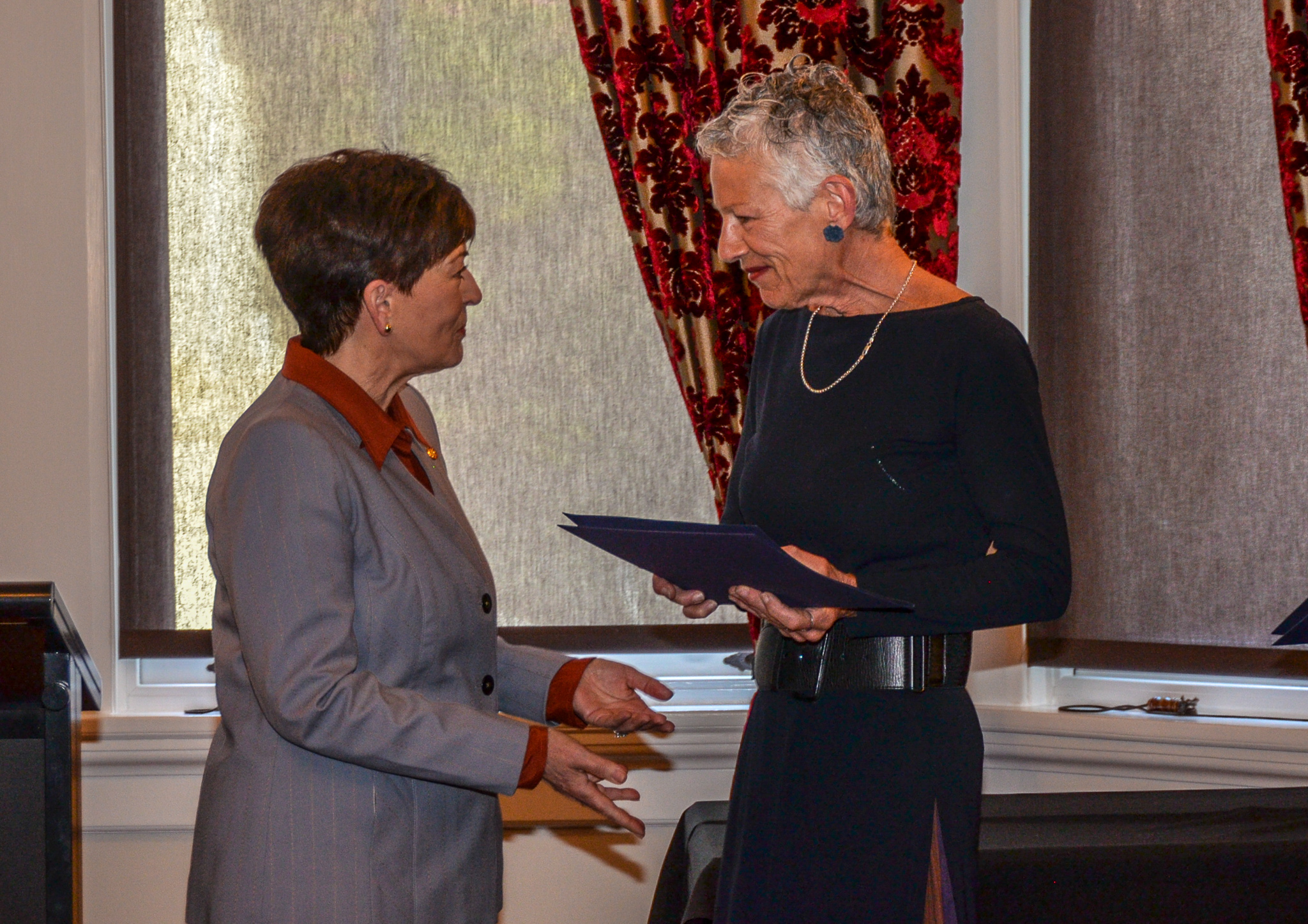
Hill (right) is presented with a Paul Harris Award by the governor-general, Dame Patsy Reddy, at Government House, Wellington, on 13 September 2019

In 2019, Hill received a Paul Harris Award for her contribution to science communication.

Hill is a Companion of the Royal Society of New Zealand.

== See also ==
- List of New Zealand television personalities
