= Claude Gauvard =

French medievalist historian & academic

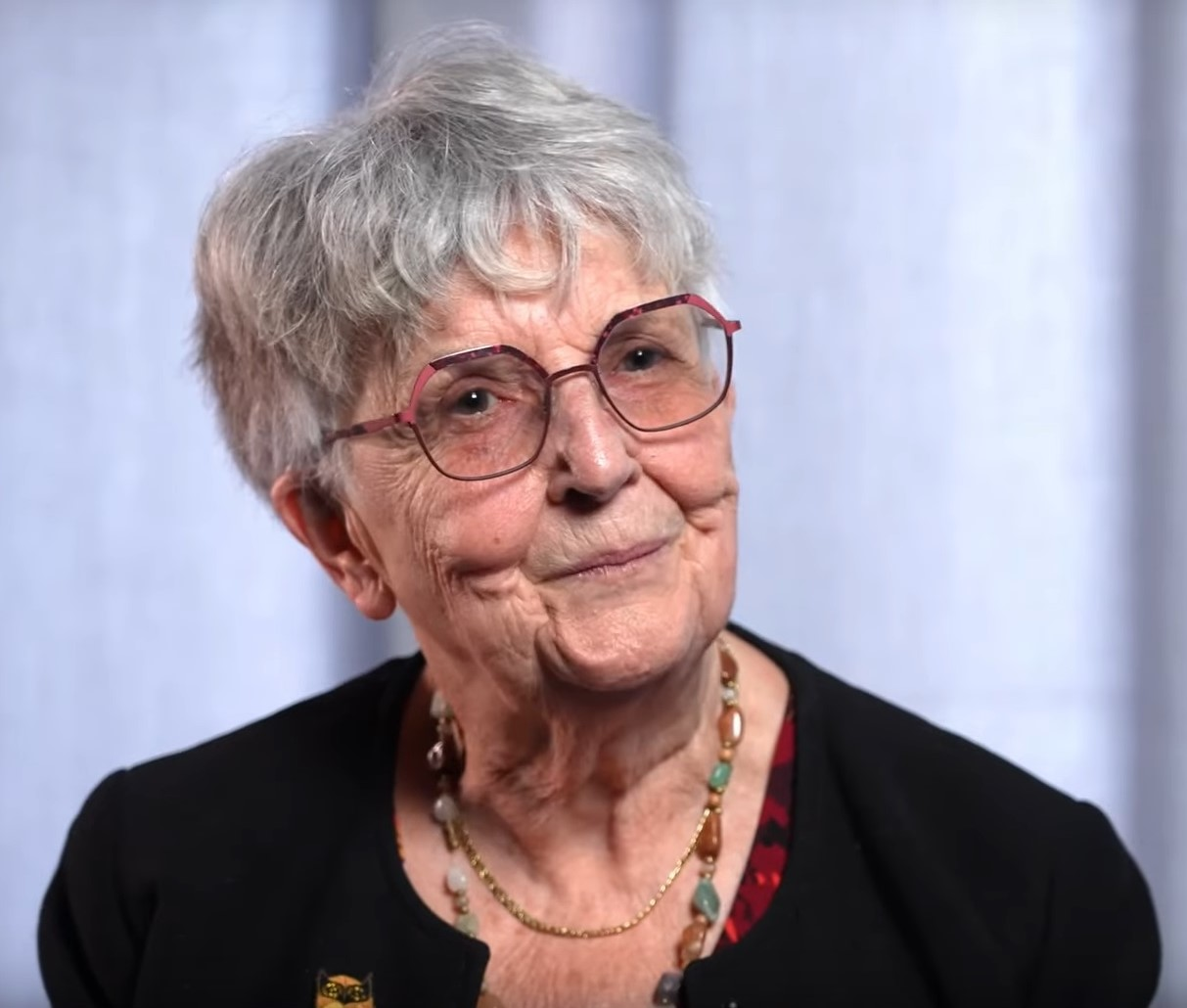
- Gauvard in 2023.
- Born: Claude Huguet; 10 December 1942 (age 83); Paris
- Occupations: French historian; President of Société de l'histoire de France
- Notable work: Ordre des Arts et des Lettres recipient

Claude Gauvard is a French historian and Middle Ages specialist. She has been the President of Société de l'histoire de France since 2009.

== Life ==
She was an assistant at the University of Rouen in 1969, then at the Sorbonne in 1971. She is a professor at the Pantheon - Sorbonne University. In 1989, she defended her doctoral thesis, Crime, État et société en France à la fin du Moyen Âge (which received the Malesherbes Prize and the Gobert Award from the Académie des Inscriptions et Belles-Lettres).

In 1990, she became a professor of history of the Middle Ages at the University of Reims. She returned to the Panthéon-Sorbonne University in 1992, where she taught history of the Middle Ages until 2009.

== Works ==
- De grace especial. Crime, État et société en France à la fin du Moyen Âge, 2 vol., Paris, Publications de la Sorbonne, 1991 (Reprinted 2010),
- Dir., La renommée, n° de la revue Médiévales, 24 (1993).
- La France au Moyen Âge du XVX siècle, Paris, PUF, 1996, (Reprinted 2010).
- Françoise Autrand & Jean-Marie Moeglin (dir.), Saint-Denis et la royauté : études offertes à Bernard Guenée, Paris, Publications de la Sorbonne, 1999.
- Robert Jacob (dir.), Les rites de la justice au Moyen Âge, Paris, Le Léopard d'or, 2000.
- Alain de Libera & Michel Zink (dir.), Dictionnaire du Moyen Âge, Paris, PUF, 2002.
- Pierre Boglioni &Robert Delort (dir.), Le petit peuple dans l'Occident médiéval : terminologies, perceptions, réalités : actes du Congrès international tenu à l'Université de Montréal (18-23 October 1999), Paris, Publications de la Sorbonne, 2002.
- Jean-Louis Robert (dir.), Être parisien : actes du colloque organisé par l'École doctorale d'histoire de l'Université Paris 1 Panthéon-Sorbonne et la Fédération des Sociétés historiques et archéologiques de Paris-Île-de-France (26-28 septembre 2002), Paris, Publications de la Sorbonne, 2004.
- Claire Boudreau, Kouky Fianou & Michel Hébert (dir.), Information et société en Occident à la fin du Moyen Âge, Paris, Publications de la Sorbonne, 2004.
- Violence et ordre public au Moyen Âge, Paris, Picard, 2005.
- Jacques Chiffoleau & Andrea Zorzi (dir.), Pratiques sociales et politiques judiciaires dans les villes de l'Occident à la fin du Moyen Âge, Rome, École française de Rome, 2007.
- Dir., L'Enquête au Moyen Âge, Rome, École française de Rome, 2008.
- Le Moyen Âge, Paris, la Martinière, 2010
- Dir. Jean-François Sirinelli, Pascal Cauchy, Les historiens français à l'œuvre, 1995-2010, Paris, PUF, 2010
- Loïc Cadiet, Frédéric Chauvaud, Pauline Schmitt-Pantel & Myriam Tsikounas (dir.), Figures de femmes criminelles de l'Antiquité à nos jours, Paris, Publications de la Sorbonne, 2010.
- Le temps des Valois, Paris, PUF, coll. « Une histoire personnelle de », 2013
- Le temps des Capétiens, Paris, PUF, coll. « Une histoire personnelle de », 2013
- La France au Moyen Âge du V^{e} au XV^{e} siècle, Paris, PUF, 2014
- Sous sa direction et celle de Jean-François Sirinelli, Dictionnaire de l'historien, PUF, 2015, 786 pages.
- Sous sa direction, Une histoire de France, Paris, PUF, 2017.
- Condamner à mort au Moyen Age. Pratiques de la peine capitale en France XIIIe-XVe siècle, Paris, PUF, 2018.
