= Catherine Larrère =

French philosopher and academic (born 1944)

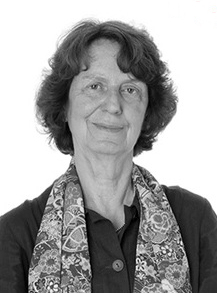
- in 2015
- Born: Catherine Delafoss; 4 August 1944 (age 82); La Rochelle, France
- Occupations: Philosopher and academic
- Known for: environmental philosophy
- Spouse: Raphaël Larrère
- Children: Mathilde Larrère

Catherine Larrère (nee Delafoss, born 4 August 1944) is a French philosopher and academic. She is a professor of philosophy emeritus (at Paris I - Pantheon Sorbonne). She is a specialist in Montesquieu's philosophy and an advocate for environmental ethics.

== Biography ==
Catherine Delafoss was born in La Rochelle in 1944.

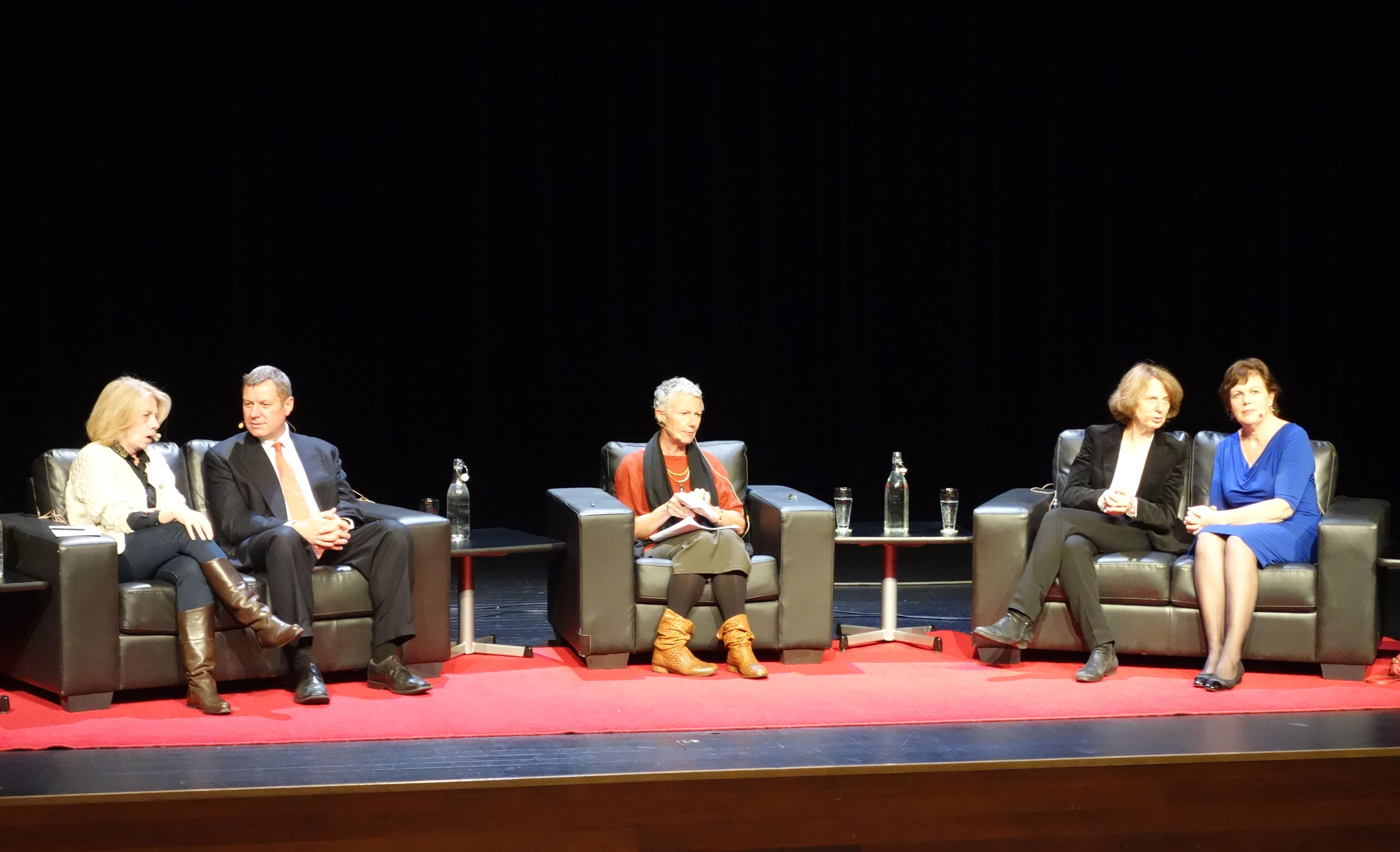
Discussion on the Anthropocene challenge in 2015. From left to right: Lucile Schmid, Prof David Frame, Kim Hill, Prof. Catherine Larrère and Bronwyn Hayward.

She first became interested in the history of economics, then in the philosopher Montesquieus ideas. In the 1990s, she met and was inspired by John Baird Callicott the American academic concerned with environmental ethics. She became an expert and was an advocate for similar British and American research. She translated works by John Baird Callicott into French.

She has participated in the development of environmental philosophy, particularly in the areas of nature protection, risk prevention and environmental justice. She has written about the role of women in society as proposed by Jean-Jacques Rousseau. She collaborates with her husband, the agronomist and ecologist Raphaël Larrère.

== Selected works ==
- L'invention de l'économie au XVIIIe siècle : du droit naturel à la physiocratie, Paris, Puf, coll. « Léviathan », 1992. (Doctoral thesis)
- Les philosophies de l'environnement. Presses universitaires de France. ISBN 978-2-13-048402-8.
- Du bon usage de la nature : pour une philosophie de l'environnement, with Raphaël Larrère, Paris, Aubier, coll. « Alto » 1997.
- La crise environnementale(with Raphaël Larrère), Paris, Éditions de l'INRA, 1997.
- Actualité de Montesquieu, Paris, Presses de Sciences Po, 1999.
- Lumières et commerce : l'exemple bordelais, with Jean Mondot, New York, P. Lang, 2000.
- Nature vive, Paris, Nathan-Muséum national d'histoire naturelle, 2000 ISBN 978-2-09-260841-8.
- L'écologie est politique, with Lucile Schmid & Olivier Frossard, Les Petits matins, 2013 ISBN 978-2-36383-112-5.
- L'éthique de la vie chez Hans Jonas, with Éric Pommier, Paris, Sorbonne Publications, 2013.
- Y a-t-il du sacré dans la nature ? (Catherine Larrère & Bérengère Hurand), Paris, Publications de la Sorbonne, 2014.
- Penser et agir avec la nature : une enquête philosophique, with Raphaël Larrère, Paris, La Découverte, 2015 ISBN 9782707185716.
- Les inégalités environnementales, Paris, Puf, coll. « La vie des idées », 2017 ISBN 978-2130650713.
- Bulles technologiques, with Raphaël Larrère, Marseille, Wildproject Editions, 2017.
- Penser l'anthropocène (Catherine Larrère & Rémi Beau), Paris, Les Presses de Sciences Po, 2018.
