= Raphaël Larrère =

French agricultural engineer (1942–2025)

- Born: 12 April 1942
- Died: 4 January 2025 (aged 82)
- Education: Institut national agronomique Paris Grignon
- Occupation: Agricultural engineer

Raphaël Larrère (12 April 1942 – 4 January 2025) was a French agricultural engineer and researcher who specialized in environmental ethics.

== Life and career ==
Born on 12 April 1942, Larrère studied agronomic engineering with a concentration in zootechnics from the Institut national agronomique Paris Grignon. In 1966, he began his researching career at the Institut national de la recherche agronomique (INRA) in the department of rural sociology in 1966. He also served as president of the scientific council of Mercantour National Park. Prior to his retirement, he was a project manager at INRA.

Larrère died on 4 January 2025, at the age of 82.

== Publications ==
- Des hommes et des forêts (with Olivier Nougarède, 1993)
- Le loup, l'agneau et l'éleveur (1999)
- La crise environnementale (1997)
- Du bon usage de la nature : pour une philosophie de l'environnement (1997)
- Histoire des parcs nationaux : comment prendre soin de la nature ? ( with Bernadette Lizet and Martine Berlan-Darqué, 2009)
- Cueillir la montagne : à travers landes, pâtures et sous-bois (with Martin de La Soudière, 2010)
- Penser et agir avec la nature : une enquête philosophique (with Catherine Larrère, 2015)
- Le Pire n'est pas certain : Essai sur l'aveuglement catastrophiste (with Catherine Larrère, 2020)
