= Paul Harris (public servant) =

New Zealand public servant and academic

Paul Raymond Harris (born Auckland 16 July 1946) is a New Zealand senior public servant and political and constitutional studies academic.

== Education ==
Harris spent his childhood in Auckland and received his secondary education at St Peter's College. He graduated BA(Hons) at Victoria University of Wellington in 1971 and Ph.D at the Australian National University in 1981.

== Career ==
Harris was Chief Executive of the Electoral Commission from 1994 until 2003. In 2007 he headed an independent working group on Fiji's elections, under the auspices of the Fiji interim Government and the Pacific Islands Forum, in the wake of the 2006 Fijian coup d'état. He has also been Country Director for Yemen at the International Foundation for Electoral Systems, and served twice as an official New Zealand election observer in Indonesia. Before serving on the electoral commission, he was a Lecturer at the Canberra College of Advanced Education (1975–1979), Senior Lecturer, Department of Politics, Victoria University of Wellington (1979–1994) and Principal Research officer, Royal Commission on the Electoral System (1985–1986).

== Notable student ==
Bronwyn Hayward – New Zealand political scientist

== Publications ==
Harris's publications include:

- "Green’s theory of political obligation and disobedience" (1982)
- T. H. Green Lectures on the Principles of Political Obligation and other Writings (co-editor) 1986.
- On Political Obligations (editor) 1990.
- New Zealand Politics Source Book (co-editor) 1992, 1994.
- Voter's Choice: Electoral Change in NZ (co-author) 1992.
