= Pierre Citron =

French musicologist

- Born: 19 April 1919; Paris
- Died: 10 November 2010 (aged 91)
- Occupation: Musicologist
- Spouse: Suzanne Citron

Pierre Citron (19 April 1919 – 10 November 2010) was a French musicologist and university professor, a specialist of novelist Jean Giono. He was the husband of historian Suzanne Citron.

== Biography ==
Pierre Citron held the degrees of agrégé ès lettres (1946) and docteur ès lettres (1960); his main thesis was entitled La poésie de Paris dans la littérature française de Rousseau à Baudelaire. Attaché de recherche at the Centre national de la recherche scientifique from 1957 to 1960, he later was study director at the Institut français de Londres (1960–1963), then professor of French literature at the Faculté des lettres at the University of Clermont-Ferrand (1963–1969). From 1970 to 1983, he held the same position at the New Sorbonne University. He was responsible for the editions of works by Balzac, Villiers de l'Isle-Adam, Mallarmé and Giono. Citron and Henri Godard edited the book series Cahiers Giono in 1981–1986. Published by éditions Gallimard, it consists of unpublished texts by and studies about Giono.

As a musicologist, Citron wrote popular books on Couperin and Bartók and, above all, was the prime architect for the publication of the general correspondence of Berlioz (8 volumes, 1972–2002), a composer whose memoirs he also edited twice (1969 and 1991).

His biography of Jean Giono earned him the prix Goncourt de la biographie in 1990. He also received the prix Henri Mondor awarded by the Académie française in 1987 for his Édition critique des poésies de Mallarmé.

== Bibliography ==
- 1956: Couperin, Paris, Seuil, Collection Microcosme. Solfèges
- 1961: La poésie de Paris dans la littérature française de Rousseau à Baudelaire, Paris, Éditions de Minuit
- 1963: Bartok, Paris, Seuil, Collection Microcosme. Solfèges
- 1986: Dans Balzac, Paris, Seuil
- 1990: Giono : 1895-1970, Paris, Seuil
- 1995: Giono, Paris, Seuil, Collection Microcosme. Écrivains de toujours
- 2010: Renaissance du village de Montjustin, Paris, Edition Petite Capitale
