= Henri Godard =

French literary scholar (born 1937)

Henri Godard (born 1937) is a French literary scholar and critic. He obtained a doctorate from the Paris-Sorbonne University in 1984 and was professor of 20th-century French literature at the Paris Diderot University and Paris-Sorbonne University.

Godard specialises in Louis-Ferdinand Céline, who is the subject of several of his books. He founded the literary society Société d'études céliniennes together with Antoine Gallimard and Jean-Pierre Dauphin in 1976. He edited the Bibliothèque de la Pléiade's edition of Céline's works in four volumes. His 600-page biography Céline was published in 2011. Godard and Pascal Fouché were responsible for transcribing, documenting and preparing the lost Céline manuscripts that were recovered in 2021, and from which three novels were published in France in 2022–2023.

Godard has also written books about the authors Jean Giono, Louis Guilloux and André Malraux. Godard and Pierre Citron edited the book series Cahiers Giono in 1981–1986. Published by éditions Gallimard, it consists of unpublished texts by and studies about Giono.
