= Putting the Humanities PhD to Work =

2010 book by Katina L. Rogers

- Cover
- Author: Katina L. Rogers
- Cover artist: Drew Sisk
- Language: English
- Subject: Higher education, career development, humanities, academic job market, academic tenure
- Genre: Non-fiction
- Publisher: Duke University Press
- Publication date: August 2020
- Publication place: United States
- Media type: Hardcover, paperback, e-book
- Pages: 184
- ISBN: 978-1-4780-0861-3
- Dewey Decimal: 331.11/4450973
- LC Class: HD6278.U5 R64 2020

Putting the Humanities PhD to Work: Thriving in and beyond the Classroom is a 2020 non-fiction book by American scholar and educational consultant Katina L. Rogers. The author addresses the disconnect between doctoral training in the humanities and the realities of the academic job market. Rogers argues that graduate programs should prepare students for a wider range of careers beyond tenure-track professorships. Drawing on survey data, interviews, and Rogers's own experience navigating a non-traditional career path after completing her PhD in comparative literature, the book offers practical guidance for graduate students and faculty while also calling for structural reforms within universities to normalize diverse professional outcomes. Rogers contends that broadening definitions of scholarly success would benefit not only individual students but also the disciplines themselves and the public at large.

== Author ==
Rogers, former co-director of the Futures Initiative at the CUNY Graduate Center, discussed the book in an interview hosted by Dr. Teresa Mangum of the University of Iowa's Obermann Center. Rogers explained that her experience working outside traditional academic departments revealed the collaborative nature of scholarly work and the broader architecture supporting higher education, insights she had not gained as a graduate student. Rogers emphasized that her book connects career reform to issues of equity, labor structures, and the devaluation of teaching. She contended that prestige-based evaluation systems perpetuate inequality and limit who chooses to pursue humanities doctoral study.

== Overview ==
Rogers investigates doctoral education as both a pragmatic career guide for graduate students and a systemic critique of the modern university. She treats the precarious academic job market not as a temporary anomaly but as a structural reality demanding a fundamental rethinking of what it means to be a scholar. Rather than viewing non-academic careers as failure, she argues that expanding the professional horizon of the humanities Ph.D. strengthens the disciplines, sustains the university, and protects students from financial and emotional ruin.

Rogers marshals statistics, personal experience, and sociological analysis to describe the pressures facing graduate students. She contends that the traditional apprenticeship model, which assumes doctoral students train solely to replace their professors, is outdated and ethically fraught. Universities that maintain this narrow pipeline despite dwindling tenure-track opportunities perpetuate inequality, as only those with independent financial means can afford to gamble on such high-risk career outcomes. Career diversity thus becomes not merely a practical necessity but a component of equity within the academy, as well as a means to increased advocacy for the public value of humanities research.

Rogers instructs scholars on how to translate their specialized training into language legible to a broader workforce, presenting this translation not as a simplification of one's intellect but as an expansion. She encourages readers to identify the transferable skills inherent in humanities research: project management, synthesis of complex information, cross-cultural competency. She reminds readers that "your value is not defined by your job title, inside the academy or out." The book reframes networking as a form of ethnographic research, suggesting that the same investigative skills used in archival work can map professional landscapes. Rogers acknowledges the grief and identity crisis that often accompany leaving the academy.

Rogers then turns from the individual student to the institution, calling upon faculty and administrators to dismantle the cultural hierarchies that prize academic placement above all other outcomes. Departments, she argues, must integrate professional development into the curriculum rather than treat it as extracurricular. The book ends with a vision of a university where scholars move freely between the academy and the public sphere, asserting that "the work of the humanities is too important to be kept within the walls of the university."

== Reviews ==
Kristen Vogt Veggeberg found the book refreshing and an empowering resource for graduate students, faculty, and administrators navigating the uncertain terrain of humanities careers. She praised Rogers for confronting uncomfortable truths about academic labor, including the exploitation masked by the rhetoric of "working for love" and the systemic inequalities embedded in university structures. Veggeberg wrote that the book "does something special—it empowers, if not emboldens, the humanities doctorate, and encourages them to see the world in a way that is deserving of their time and hard work."

In their review of the book, Sonali Majumdar and Brandon Walsh deemed the book as a valuable guide for those who advise graduate students and a compelling argument for reforming doctoral training. They noted that Rogers used her own unconventional career trajectory to ground her practical recommendations. Majumdar and Walsh connected the book's recommendations to ongoing initiatives at the University of Virginia. They suggested that Rogers's vision aligned with broader institutional efforts to make diverse career outcomes "visible, valued and viable." Regardless of one's position in the academy, the reviewers thought, the book served as both a call for institutional reform and an invitation to individual action.
