= Lucile Schmid =

French politician (born 1962)

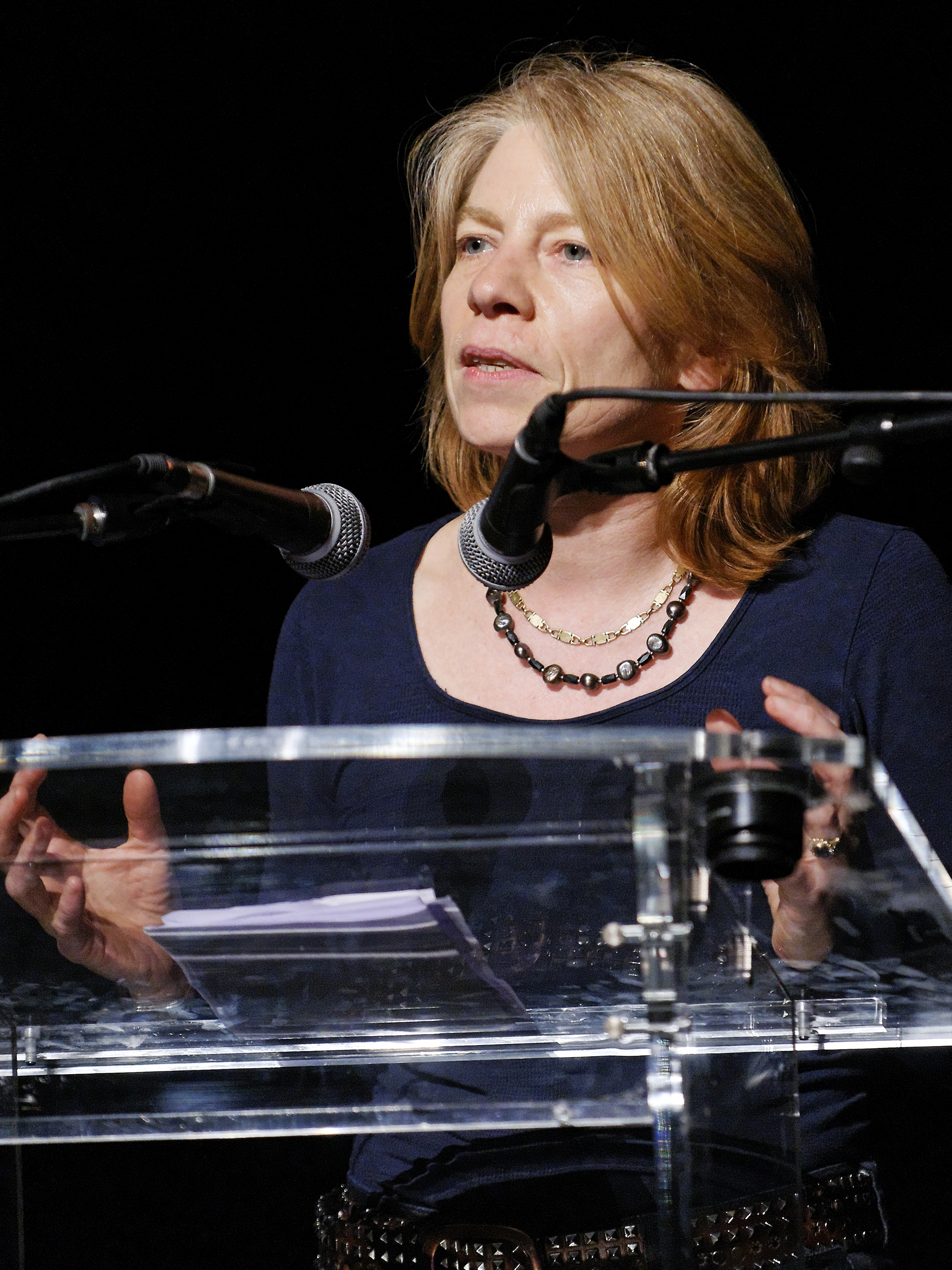
- Schmid in 2010
- Born: August 26, 1962 (age 63); Versailles, Yvelines, France
- Occupation: politician
- Political party: Europe Ecology – The Greens (EELV)

Lucile Schmid or Lucile Provost (born August 26, 1962) is a French politician of the Europe Ecology – The Greens party (EELV). She serves in the French Ministry of Economy and Finances and she is co-president of the Green European Foundation (GEF).

== Life ==
Schmid was born in Versailles, Yvelines, on August 26, 1962.

After joining the environmentalist party, Lucile Schmid participates in the 2010 regional campaign, especially in the Hauts-de-Seine where she lives, but without being a candidate. She was involved in the construction of the Europe Ecology – The Greens party (EELV). She is also a member of the founding college of the Political Ecology Foundation (alongside, among others, Jean-Paul Besset and Alain Lipietz)).

During the cantonal elections of 2011, she was a candidate for the EELV in the canton of Issy-les-Moulineaux-East, she obtained 15.13% of the votes in the first round. In the second round, she supported the Socialist Party candidate.

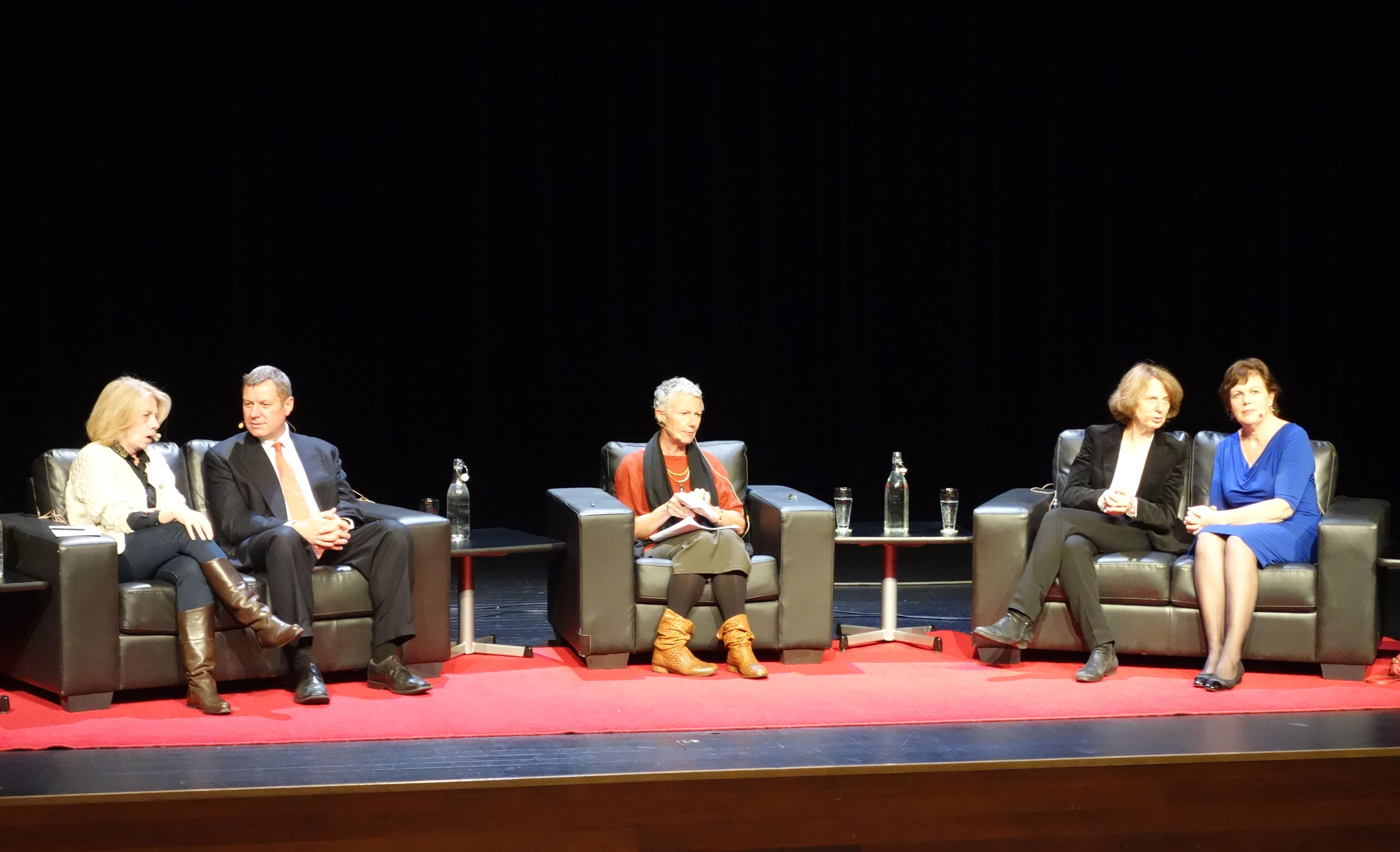
Discussion on the Anthropocene challenge in 2015. From left to right: Lucile Schmid, Prof David Frame, Kim Hill, Prof. Catherine Larrère and Bronwyn Hayward.

In the leadership of the party, she was appointed co-director of the campaign for the presidential elections of 2012. After the Europe Ecology The Greens convention of November 2013 she started three years in the executive office where she is responsible for monitoring climate negotiations.

She is a board member of the think tank La Fabrique écologique8 and the editorial board of the revue Esprit magazine. In 2018, she serves in the French Ministry of Economy and Finances and she was co-president of the Green European Foundation (GEF).

== Publications ==
- La Seconde Guerre d’Algérie, le quiproquo franco algérien (sous le nom de Lucile Provost), Paris, Flammarion, 1996 ISBN 978-2080672575, 2080672576
- Le Bruit du tic tac, Paris, Robert Laffont, 2000 ISBN 978-2221096048, 2221096045
- Une femme au pays des hommes politiques, Paris, Flammarion, 2003 ISBN 978-2082102933, 2082102939
- L’Égalité en danger ?, Paris, Bourin, 2006 ISBN 978-2849410516, 2849410519
- Parité circus, Paris, Calmann-Lévy, 2008 ISBN 978-2702138946
- L'écologie est politique avec Catherine Larrère et Olivier Fressard, Paris, Les Petits matins/Fondation de l'Écologie politique, 2013 ISBN 9782363831125
- Dossier « Les mondes de l'écologie » (coordination), revue Esprit, 2018
