= Michel Labrousse =

French historian

Michel Labrousse (25 December 1912, Brive-la-Gaillarde – 1988) was a 20th-century French historian.

A student at the École normale supérieure in Paris from 1931 to 1935, Michel Labrousse obtained there his agrégation of history and geography. He was a member of the École française de Rome from 1936 to 1938, then a teacher in a high school in Bordeaux until the breakup of World War II. Drafted as Intelligence assessment officer, he was captured June 22, 1940, and was interned in Germany. He was a professor in the camp captivity University before being delivered and returned to France in 1945.

He then became professor of ancient and Roman history at the Faculty of Letters of Toulouse. He defended two thesis at the Sorbonne in 1969 and then became a doctor-es-lettres.

In addition to his teaching activities, he was also interested in archeology. He was Director of historic antiquities of Midi-Pyrénées from 1946 to 1981 and member of the Board of archaeological research. He was president of the "Société archéologique du Midi de la France" from 1958 to 1988. He led excavations on the site of the Battle of Gergovia and especially in his native region of Aquitaine.

== Principal work ==
- Toulouse antique des origines à l'établissement des Wisigoths, Paris, E. de Boccard, 1968, Bibliothèque des Écoles françaises d'Athènes et de Rome, n°112, 644 p., 54 fig., one map and 9 inset plates.
