= Academic job market =

Pool of open positions in academia

Academic job market refers to the pool of vacant teaching and administrative positions in Academia, i.e. in academic institutions of higher education such as universities and colleges, and also to the competition for these positions, and the mechanisms for advertising and filling them. This job market differs somewhat from other job markets because of such institutions as tenure. It is frequently a subject of debate relating to questions of openness, discrimination and reverse discrimination, and political interference.

The Academic job market, like the structure of academic careers, operates somewhat differently in different countries.

In 2022 Nature reports a wave of departures of scientists, which calls attention to widespread discontent in universities.

== Literature ==
- Green, Jerry R. (1991). Charles T. Clotfelter and Michael Rothschild (ed.). Future Graduate Study and Academic Careers (PDF) (Studies of Supply and Demand in Higher Education ed.). National Bureau of Economic Research. pp. 145–182. ISBN 0-226-11054-0.
- Rogers, K. L. (2020). Putting the Humanities PhD to Work: Thriving in and beyond the Classroom. Duke University Press.
