= Robert Muchembled =

French historian (born 1944)

- Born: 4 March 1944 (age 82)
- Occupations: Historian, professor

Academic background
- Education: Agrégation in history (1967); Doctorate (1985)

Academic work
- Discipline: Modern history
- Institutions: Paris 13 University
- Notable works: Studies on witchcraft, violence, and sexuality

Robert Muchembled (born 4 March 1944) is a French historian. In 1967, he passed the Agrégation in history. In 1985 he was awarded a doctorate for his thesis on attitudes to violence and society in Artois between 1440 and 1600. In 1986 he became Professor of Modern History at Paris 13 University. He has written notably about witchcraft, violence and sexuality. Some of his works have been translated into English, German, Spanish, Italian, German, Dutch, Croatian, Modern Greek, Turkish, Chinese, Japanese, Polish and Portuguese.

== Works ==
- Culture populaire et culture des élites dans la France moderne (XVe-xviiie siècle), Essai, Paris, Flammarion, 1978 rééd. Champs-Flammarion, 1991.
  - Translated to English as Popular culture and elite culture in France, 1400-1750.
  - Translated into Italian as Cultura popolare e cultura delle élites nella Francia moderna : (XV-XVIII secolo)
  - Translated into German as Kultur des Volks - Kultur der Eliten : die Geschichte einer erfolgreichen Verdrängung.
- Prophètes et sorciers dans les Pays-Bas, XVe-xviiie siècle (en coll. avec M.-S. Dupont-Bouchat et W. Frijhoff), Paris, Hachette, 1978.
- La sorcière au village (XVe-xviiie siècle), Paris, Gallimard-Julliard, 1979 rééd. Gallimard-Folio, 1991.
  - Translated into Italian as La sorcière au village : (15.e-18.e siècle)
- Les derniers bûchers. Un village de Flandre et ses sorcières sous Louis XIV, Paris, Ramsay, 1987.
- Nos ancêtres les paysans. Aspects du monde rural dans le Nord-Pas-De-Calais des origines à nos jours (en coll. avec G. Sivéry et divers auteurs), Lille, CNDP-CRDP, 1983.
- Sorcières, justice et société aux XVIe-xviie siècle, Paris, Imago, 1987.
- L'invention de l'homme moderne. Sensibilités, mœurs et comportements collectifs sous l'Ancien Régime, Paris, Fayard, 1988, rééd. Hachette_Pluriel, 1994.
  - Translated into German as Die Erfindung des modernen Menschen : Gefühlsdifferenzierung und kollektive Verhaltensweisen im Zeitalter des Absolutismus
  - Translated into Dutch as De uitvinding van de moderne mens : collectief gedrag, zeden, gewoonten en gevoelswereld van de middeleeuwen tot de Franse Revolutie
  - Translated into Japanese as ロベール・ミュシャンブレッド著; 石井洋二郎訳 石井, 洋二郎,
- Société, cultures et mentalités dans la France moderne XVe au xviiie siècle, Paris, A. Colin, 1990, rééd. A. Colin/VUEF, Paris, 2003.
- La violence au village. Sociabilité et comportements populaires en Artois du XVe au xviie siècle, Turnhout, Brepols, 1989.
  - English translation A history of violence : from the end of the Middle Ages to the present.
  - Italian translation: Storia della violenza : dal Medioevo ai giorni nostri
  - Spanish translation Una historia de la violencia del final de la Edad Media a la actualidad
- Le Temps des supplices. De l'obéissance sous les rois absolus, XVe-xviiie siècle, Paris, A. Colin, 1992, rééd. Le Grand Livre du Mois, 2001. Rééd. en poche : Presse Pocket, coll. "Agora".
- Le Roi et le Sorcière. L'Europe des bûchers, XVe-xviiie siècle, Paris, Desclée, 1993.
- La Société policée. Politique et politesse en France du XVe au xxe siècle, Paris, Le Seuil, 1998.
- Une histoire du diable, XIIe-xxe siècle, Paris, Seuil, 2000, rééd. Points-Seuil, 2002.
  - Translated into English as A history of the devil : from the middle ages to the present
  - Translated into Spanish as Historia del diablo : siglos XII-XX
  - Translated into Czech as Dějiny ďábla
  - Translated into Polish as Dzieje diabła : od XII do XX wieku
  - Translated into Croatian as Đavao od XII. do XX. stoljeća
  - Translated into Swedish as Djävulens historia
  - Translated into Greek as Mia istoria tou diavolou, 12os-20os aiōnas
  - Translated into Japanese as 悪魔の歴史12-20世紀 : 西欧文明に見る闇の力学
  - Translated into Chinese as 魔鬼的历史
  - Translated into Portuguese as Uma História do Diabo: Séculos XII a XX
- Diable!, Paris, Seuil/Arte Éditions, 2002.
- Passions de femmes au temps de la reine Margot, Paris, Le Seuil, 2003.
- L'orgasme et l'Occident: Une histoire du plaisir du xvie siècle à nos jours, Paris, Le Seuil, 2005.
  - Translated into English as Orgasm and the West : a history of pleasure from the sixteenth century to the present
  - Translated into Italian as L'orgasmo e l'Occidente : storia del piacere dal Rinascimento a oggi
  - Translated into Spanish as El orgasmo y occidente : una historia del placer desde el siglo XVI a nuestros días
  - Translated into Modern Greek as O orgasmos kai ē dysē : istoria tēs sarkikēs apolausēs apo ton 16o aiōna ōs tēn epochē mas
  - Translated into Japanese as オルガスムの歴史
  - Translated into Polish as Orgazm i Zachód : historia rozkoszy od XVI wieku do dziś
  - Translated into Ukrainian as "Оргазм і Захід. Історія задоволення від XVI століття до наших днів." - Київ, Темпора, 2011. - 444 с. ISBN 978-966-8201-81-3
- Une histoire de la violence, Paris, Le Seuil, 2008.
- Sous la direction de R. Muchembled : Magie et sorcellerie en Europe du Moyen Âge à nos jours, Paris, A. Colin, 1994.
- Les Ripoux des Lumières, Corruption policière et Révolution, Paris, Le Seuil, 2011.
- Insoumises. Une autre histoire des Françaises, XVIe-XXIe siècle, Paris, Autrement, 2013.
- La Civilisation des odeurs (XVIe siècle-début XIXe siècle), Paris, Les Belles Lettres, 2017
  - Translated into English as Smells: A Cultural History of Odours in Early Modern Times
  - Translated into Russian as Цивилизация запахов
