= Robert Delort =

- Born: 21 September 1932 (age 93)
- Education: École Normale Supérieure, Paris Diderot University, School for Advanced Studies in the Social Sciences
- Occupations: Historian, medievalist

Robert Delort (born 21 September 1932) is a French professeur agrégé trained at the École Normale Supérieure (ENS) in the early 1950s, historian and medievalist specialised in the history of the Republic of Venice, economic history and environmental history. He is particularly interested in the history of relationships between man and animals, as part of the “zoohistory”.

== Career ==
Delort was educated at ENS since 1953, where he prepared the Aggregation of History (Agrégation d’histoire) and later he defended his dissertation on medieval history at the School for Advanced Studies in the Social Sciences. He was a member of École française de Rome from 1960 to 1962. He presented his thèse d'état at Sorbonne in 1975 and completed his degree in Sciences at Paris Diderot University.

He became a professor at the lyceum of Douai and assistant professor at Sorbonne (1963–1968). He was a lecturer and professor at the Paris 8 University and École normale supérieure, then an ordinary professor at University of Geneva.

As part of his research and teaching, he has spent long periods in Berlin (Berlin Institute for Advanced Study, 1983–1984), Montreal (1987), London (1993–1994) and has given seminars or courses, in particular at Bielefeld University, in Rome, in Berlin and also in Moscow (Moscow State University, 2003).

From 1983 to 1987, he was section president of the National Commission of the CNRS. He organised the millennium colloquiums of France (1987) then directed the scientific programme “Histoire de l’Environnement” (1987–1991) for the Programme interdisciplinaire de recherches sur l'environnement.

== Selected publications ==
- With Philippe Braunstein, Venise : Portrait historique d’une cité, Éditions du Seuil, 1971
- Life in the Middle Ages, Edita Lausanne, distributed by Universe Books, 1973
- Le commerce des fourrures en Occident a la fin du Moyan Age . 2 vols., Bibliotheque de l'Ecole francaise de Rome 1978
- Le Moyen Âge : Histoire illustrée de la vie quotidienne, Éditions du Seuil, 1983
- Les croisades, Éditions du Seuil, 1988
- Charlemagne, MA Éditions, 1989
- Les Éléphants, piliers du monde, collection « Découvertes Gallimard » (nº 93), série Histoire. Éditions Gallimard, 1990
  - The Life and Lore of the Elephant, “Abrams Discoveries” series. Harry N. Abrams, 1992 (U.S. edition)
  - The Life and Lore of the Elephant, ‘New Horizons’ series, Thames & Hudson, 1992 (UK edition)
- Les animaux ont une histoire, Contemporary French Fiction, 1993
- L’Histoire de l’environnement européen, Presses Universitaires de France, 2001
