= Robert Fossier =

Robert Fossier (4 September 1927 – 25 May 2012) was a French Historian, specializing in the Western Middle Ages.

== Biography ==
=== Family and Education ===
Robert Fossier was born into Catholicism. His father, a soldier who served in World War I, was angered by the Munich Agreement. His mother, a piano teacher, encouraged an interest in history and fiction. He did his secondary education in Paris, first at the lycée Janson-de-Sailly, then at the lycée Henri-IV, where he prepped for the entrance exam of the École des chartes.

He graduated with a thesis on The economic life of the abbey of Clairvaux, from its beginning to the sixteenth century (1949), and passed the teaching exam (agrégation) in history.

== University career ==
Robert Fossier began his career as an archivist in the historical library of Paris (1949–1953). He then became a teacher at the lycée de Fontainebleau (1953–1955), then at the lycée Carnot in Paris (1955–1957).

In 1957, he became assistant at the Sorbonne, then chargé de cours at Nancy II university from 1961. Ten years later, he became professor at the Université Paris 1 Panthéon-Sorbonne, where he was several times chair of the history department, and then in 1993, professor emeritus.

In 1971, he received the CNRS Silver Medal. He was president of the Société de l'École des chartes from 1990 to 1991.

He died on May 25, 2012, at Meudon.

== Historian of the Middle Ages ==
As one of the spiritual successors of Marc Bloch and the École des Annales (in his work on society and economics rather than religion and culture), Robert Fossier dealt almost exclusively with the rural societies of northwestern Europe, from Charlemagne to the Hundred Years' War.

In 1968, he published his doctoral thesis entitled La Terre et les hommes en Picardie jusqu’à la fin du XIII^{e} siècle (The Land and People of Picardy to the End of the 13th Century).

In the 1970s, he began to focus his research and publications on the peasantry and feudalism (a term he refuses to use) between the eleventh and thirteenth centuries.

He is the inventor of the concept of encellulement, which expands on Pierre Toubert's concept of incastellamento. According to Robert Fossier, the grouping of the village in the north of the French kingdom was due not only to incastellamento, but rather to lordly initiative in general.

In his latest book, Ces gens du Moyen Age (translated as The Axe and the Oath: Ordinary Life in the Middle Ages), Robert Fossier deemphasises the aspect of medieval society which we are most familiar, the aristocracy, in order to concentrate on that less spoken-of aspect, the people. In his own words of summary, "I am persuaded that medieval man is us".

The works of Robert Fossier have gained considerable fame (including at least 37 translations in North and South America, Japan, Germany, and Great Britain).

== Robert Fossier Bibliography (French) ==
- La Terre et les hommes en Picardie jusqu’à la fin du XIII^{e} siècle, Nauwelerts, 1968.
- Histoire de la Picardie, Privat, 1974.
- Enfance de l’Europe : X^{e}–XII^{e} siècle : aspects économiques et sociaux, PUF, 1982.
- Paysans d'Occident (XI^{e}–XIV^{e} siècles), PUF, 1984.
- Villages et villageois au Moyen Âge, Éditions Christian, 1995.
- L’histoire économique et sociale du Moyen Âge occidental, Brepols, 1999.
- Le Travail au Moyen Âge, Hachette, 2000.
- Ces gens du Moyen Âge, Fayard, 2007.

== Works in English ==
- The Axe and the Oath: Ordinary Life in the Middle Ages (Princeton UP, 2012)
- The Cambridge Illustrated History of the Middle Ages, Volume 2 (Cambridge UP, 1997)

== Relevant articles ==
- Incastellamento
