= Egyptian Museum =

History museum in Cairo, Egypt

- المتحف المصري

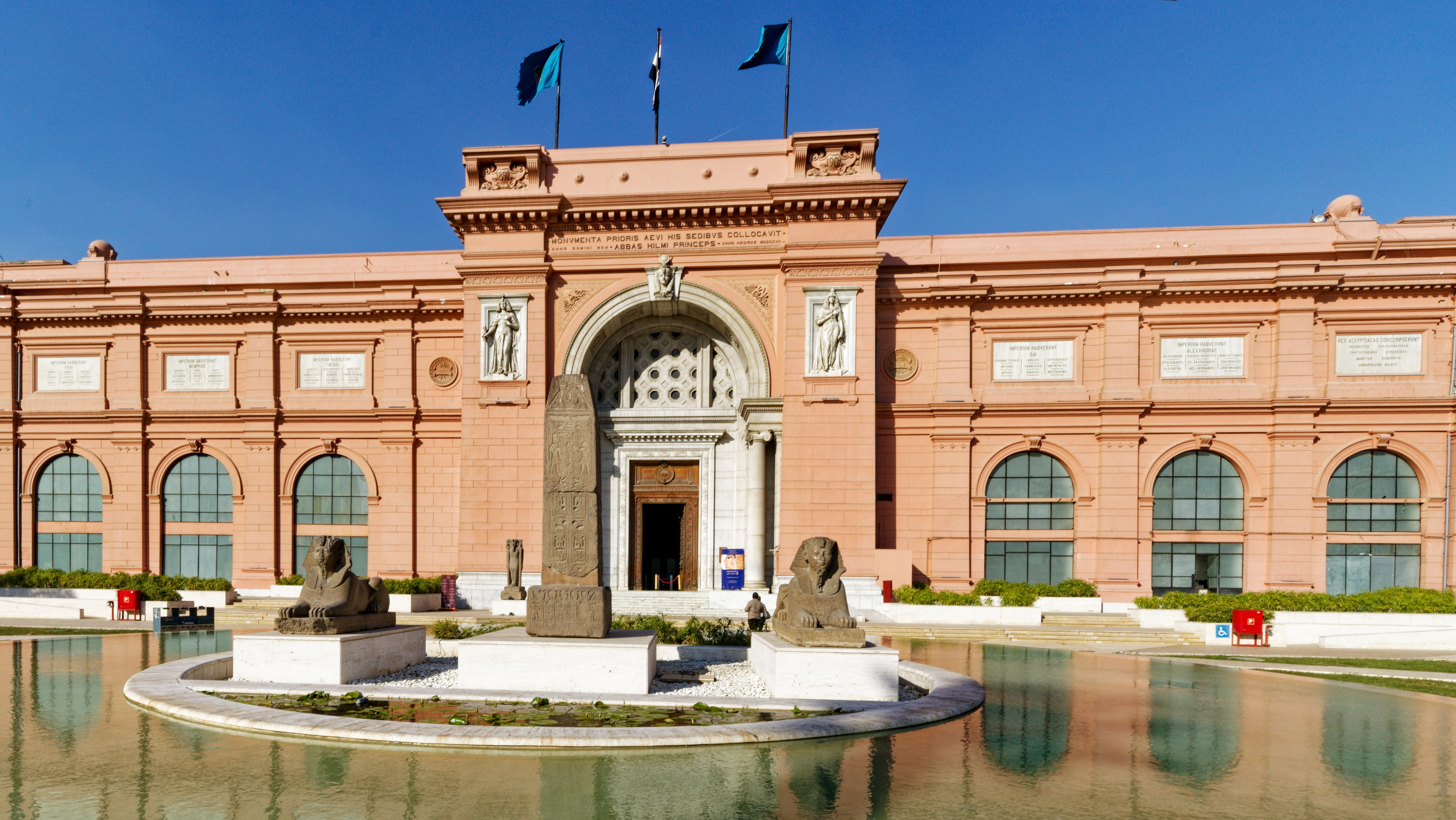
- Established: 1902; 124 years ago
- Location: Tahrir Square, Cairo, Egypt
- Coordinates: 30°02′52″N 31°14′00″E
- Type: History museum
- Collection size: 170,000 items
- Director: Dr. Ali Abdelhalim Ali
- Architect: Marcel Dourgnon
- Website: egyptianmuseumcairo.eg

The Museum of Egyptian Antiquities, commonly known as the Egyptian Museum (Arabic: المتحف المصري, romanized: al-Matḥaf al-Miṣrī) and also called the Cairo Museum or the Egyptian Museum in Cairo (EMC), is a national history museum in Cairo, Egypt.

An Egyptological museum, it houses the largest collection of Egyptian antiquities in the world, including over 170,000 items. The Egyptian Museum occupies a building constructed in 1901 on Tahrir Square and is one of the largest museums in Africa as well as the first national museum established in the Middle East.

== History ==
=== Early museums and relocations ===
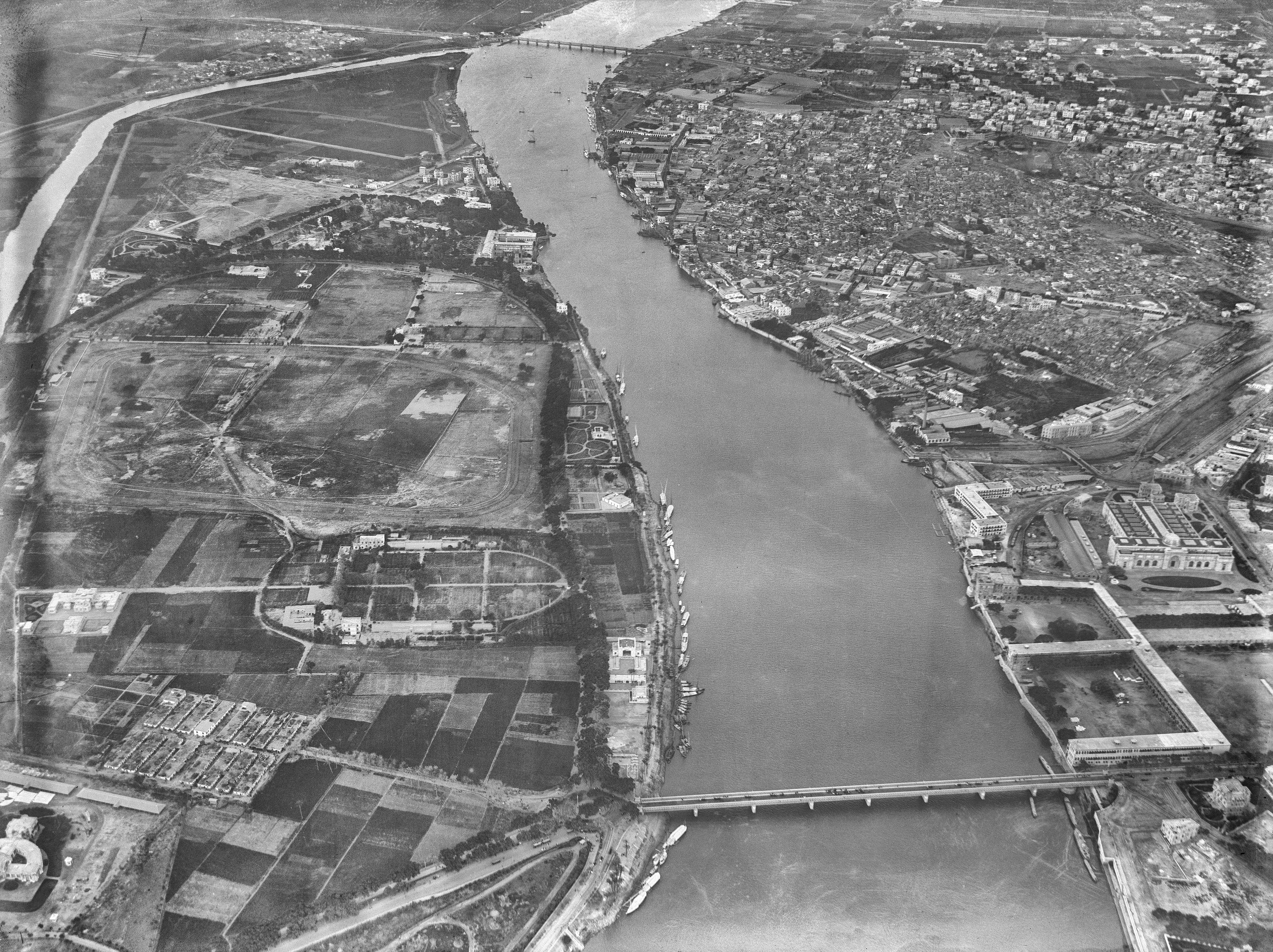
Aerial view 1904 from a balloon where the Egyptian Museum appears to the right side.

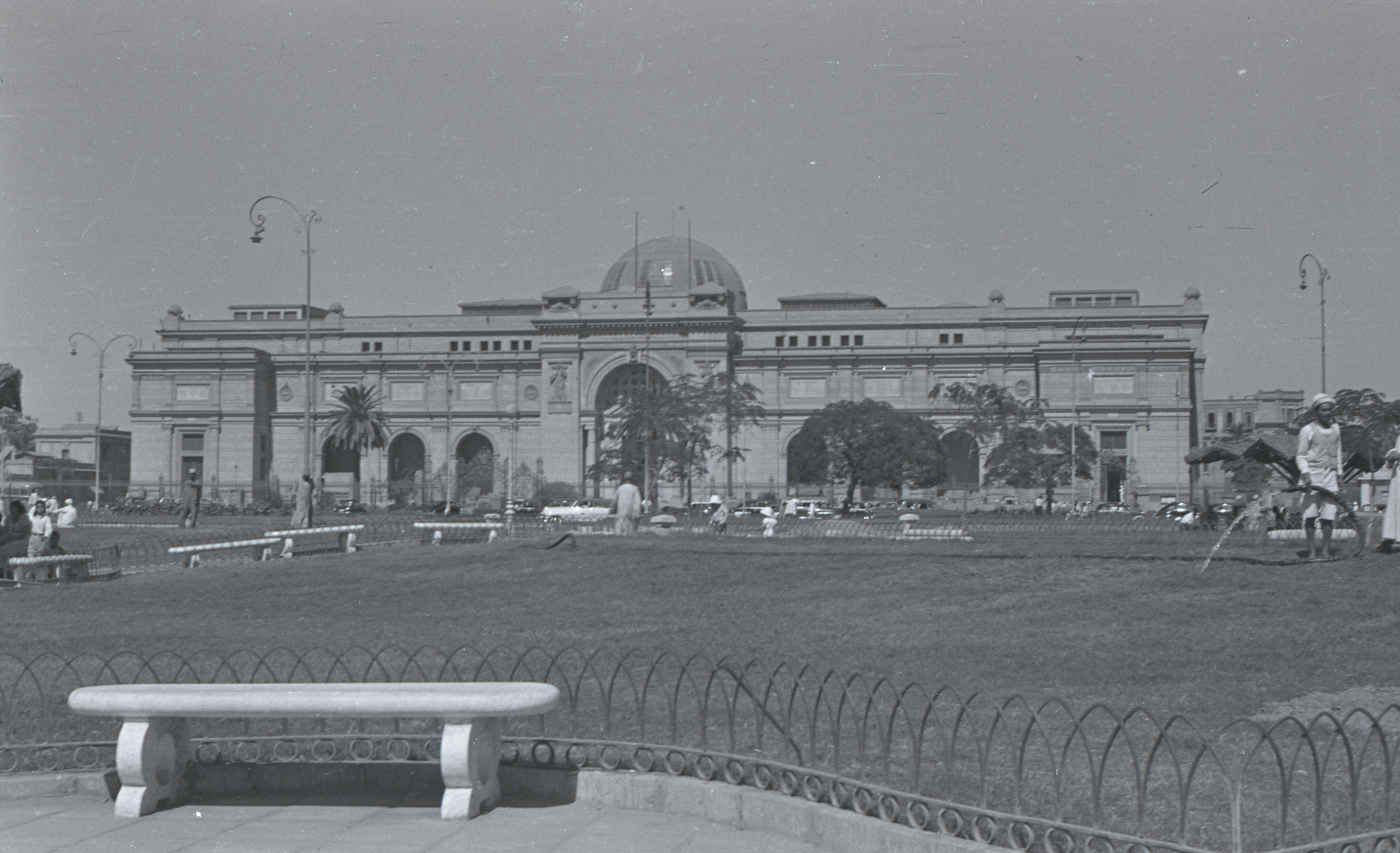
The Egyptian Museum in the 1950s

The Egyptian government established a museum in 1835 near the Ezbekieh Garden.

Youssef Diaa Effendi, the director of the Department of Antiquities, began inspecting the antiquities of Middle Egypt shortly after assuming his position, focusing on those discovered by farmers. In 1848, Muhammad Ali Pasha assigned Linan Bek, the Minister of Education, to compile a report on archaeological sites and send artifacts to the Egyptian Museum. However, this effort was not successful due to the death of Muhammad Ali Pasha in 1849, followed by a period of instability. The trade in antiquities resurfaced, and the collection housed in the museum established in Azbakeya began to shrink until it was transferred to a single hall in the Cairo Citadel. The situation worsened when Khedive Abbas I donated the entire contents of this hall to Archduke Maximilian of Austria during his visit to the citadel in 1855; these are now in the Kunsthistorisches Museum, Vienna.

Following the foundation of the new Antiquities Department under the direction of Auguste Mariette, a new museum was established in 1858 at Boulaq in a former warehouse on the riverbank. Mariette considered the Boulaq Museum a temporary location, and after the building was damaged in an 1878 Nile flood, he advocated for a permanent museum with greater capacity, situated away from the flood path. After Mariette's death, he was succeeded by Gaston Maspero, who attempted to move the museum from Boulaq but was unsuccessful. By 1889, the building was overcrowded, with no available rooms for more artifacts in either the exhibition halls or storage areas. Artifacts discovered during excavations were often left for long periods in boats in Upper Egypt. Khedive Ismail offered one of his palaces in Giza, the location of the present-day zoo, to serve as the new museum. Between the summer and the end of 1889, all the artifacts were moved from the Boulaq Museum to Giza, and the artifacts were reorganized in the new museum by the scholar De Morgan, who served as the museum's director. From 1897 to 1899, Loret succeeded De Morgan, but Maspero returned to manage the museum from 1899 to 1914.

The artifacts remained there until 1902 when they were moved again to the current museum in Tahrir Square, built by the Italian company of Giuseppe Garozzo and Francesco Zaffrani to a design by the French architect Marcel Dourgnon.

=== Construction and opening ===
The museum was designed by the French architect Marcel Dournon in 1897. The chosen site was on the northern side of Tahrir Square (formerly Ismailia Square), along the British Army barracks in Cairo near Qasr El-Nil. The foundation stone was laid on 1 April 1897, in the presence of Khedive Abbas Hilmi II, the Prime Minister, and all his cabinet members. The project was completed by the German architect Hermann Grabe. In November 1903, the Antiquities Department appointed the Italian architect Alessandro Parazenti, who had received the keys to the museum on 9 March 1902. At this time, archaeological collections from Khedive Ismail's palace in Giza began to be moved to the new museum. The move required five thousand wooden carts, while large artifacts travelled by two trains that made about nineteen round trips between Giza and Qasr El-Nil. The first shipment carried approximately 48 stone coffins, weighing over 1,000 tons in total. The transfer was completed by 13 July 1902, and Mariette's tomb was moved to the museum garden in accordance with his wish to be buried among the artifacts he had spent much of his life collecting.

The Egyptian Museum was officially opened on 15 November 1902. The new museum arranged its halls chronologically, allotting no rooms to intermediate periods, which were considered historically insignificant. Artifacts were grouped by theme; for structural reasons, large statues stood on the ground floor, while funerary items were displayed on the first floor in chronological order. The museum grew so crowded with artifacts that it came to resemble a storage facility. When asked about this, Maspero replied that the Egyptian Museum was a reflection of a pharaonic tomb or temple, where every part of the space was used to display paintings or hieroglyphic inscriptions.

=== 20th and 21st centuries ===
The museum gardens initially reached the banks of the Nile; however, in 1954, the land was expropriated to build the Cairo Municipality Building.

In 2004, the museum appointed Wafaa El Saddik as the first female director general.

In the Egyptian Revolution of 2011, the museum was broken into and reportedly used as a torture site, with protestors forcibly detained and allegedly abused, according to reports, videos, and eyewitness accounts. Activists state that "men were being tortured with electric shocks, whips and wires," and "women were tied to fences and trees." Singer and activist Ramy Essam was among those detained and tortured.

During this time, two mummies were destroyed, a third was damaged by fire, several artifacts were damaged, and 54 objects were stolen. Twenty-five of the missing objects were found soon after on the grounds of the museum. Among these were six of seven Ushabtis of Yuya, and a statuette recovered in 2014; one shabti remains missing. The restored artifacts were displayed in September 2013 in an exhibition titled "Damaged and Restored". Among these artefacts were two statues of King Tutankhamun made of cedar wood and covered with gold, a statue of King Akhenaten, Ushabti statues that belonged to the Nubian kings, a mummy of a child that was unwrapped due to its bandages being burned, and a small polychrome glass vase.

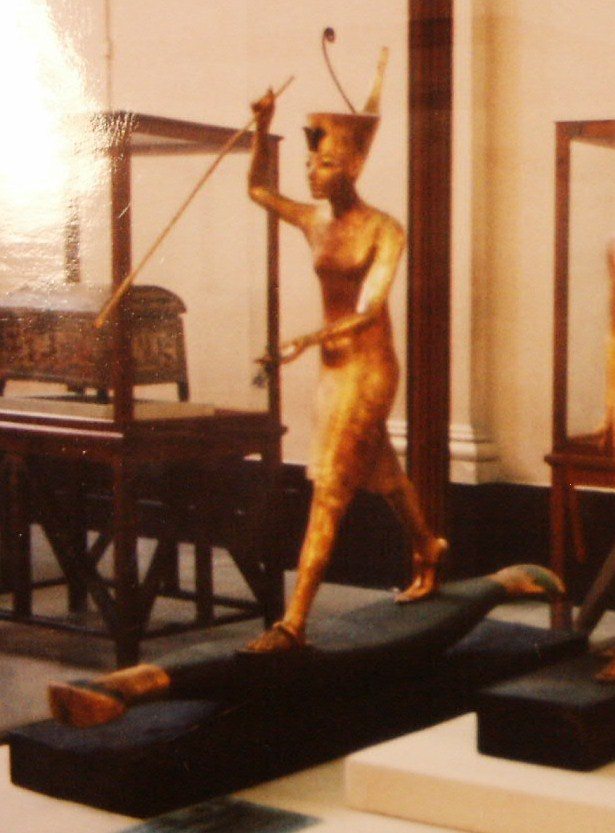
Statue of Tutankhamun harpooning on a reed float before it was damaged in the 2011 revolution

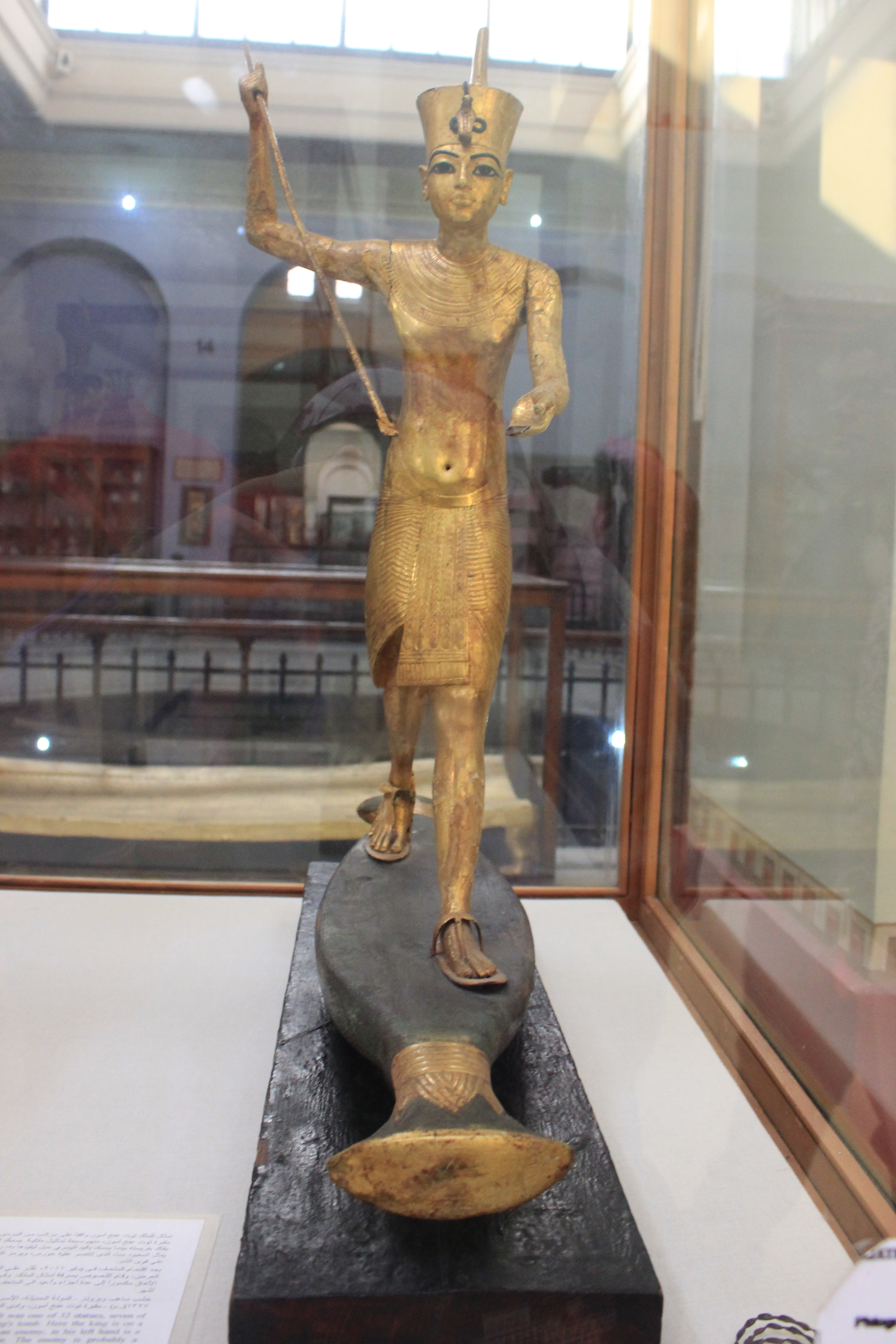
The same statue after damage and subsequent restoration. The object in its left hand is now gone.

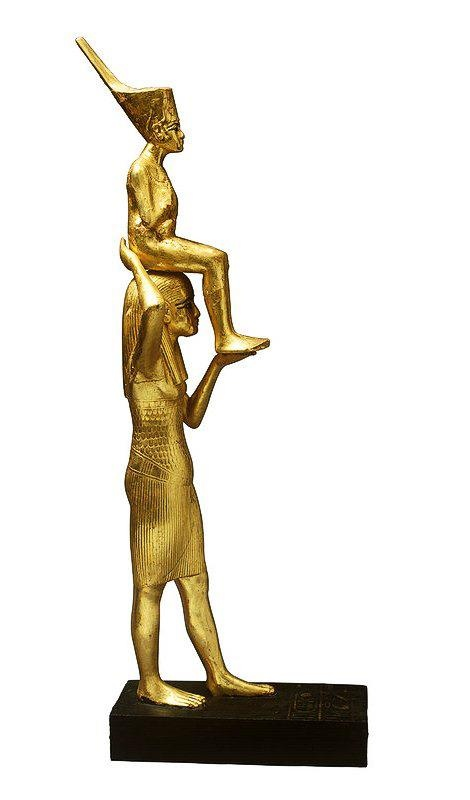
Gilded wooden statue of Tutankhamun being carried by the goddess Menkeret. It was stolen during the 25 January 2011 Revolution and has been missing since.

== Museum development ==
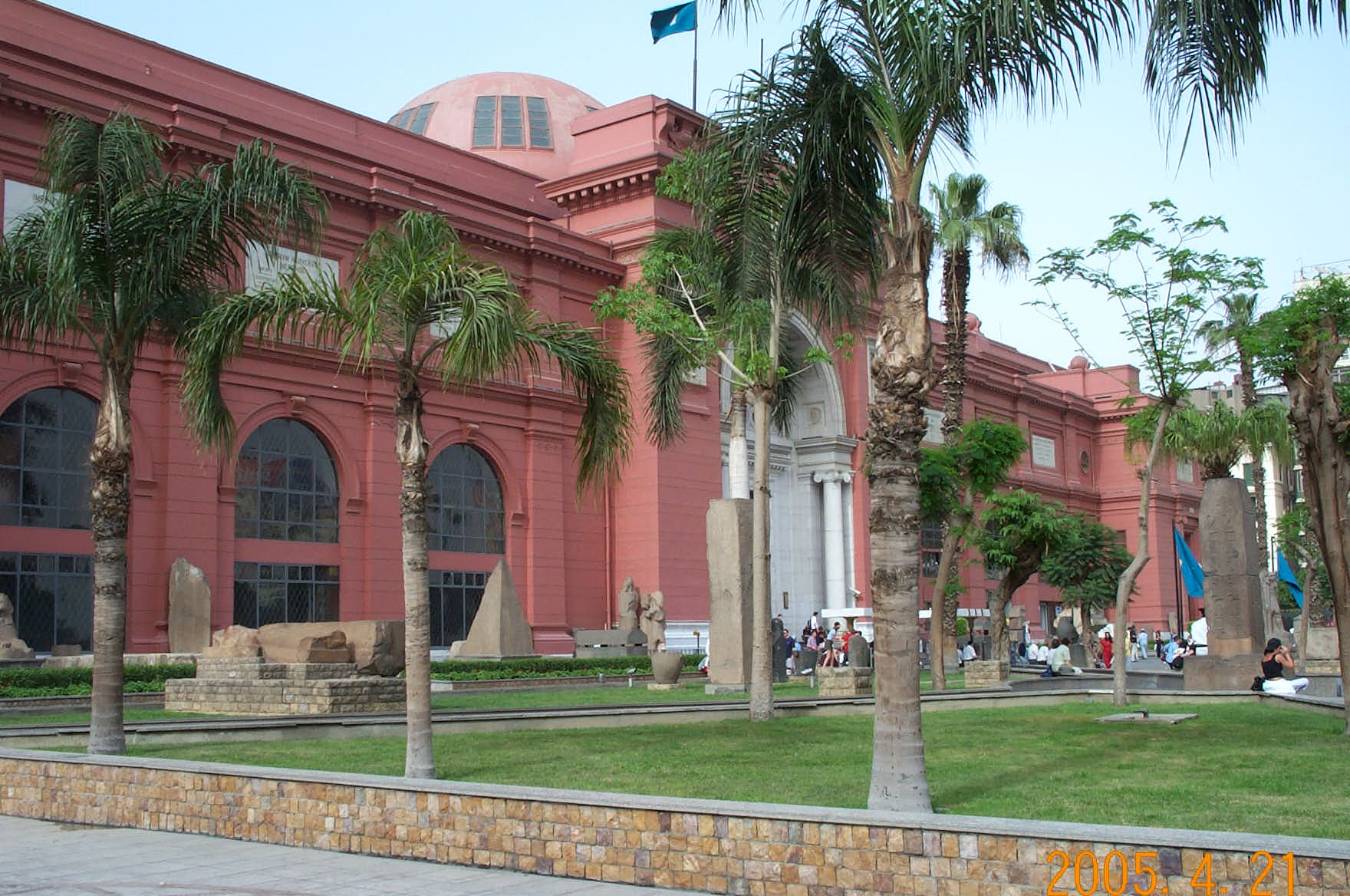
The distinctive color of the museum's exterior

In 1983, the museum building was registered as an Egyptian heritage site. In August 2006, a major renovation began. This included a cultural center and an administrative-commercial annex on the western side of the museum, where informal settlements were removed. Due to damage the building had suffered over the years from pollution and heavy traffic, which obscured much of its original appearance, the Ministry of Antiquities launched an initiative in May 2012 to create a rehabilitation plan for the museum. The German Foreign Ministry funded the necessary studies and research, and the International Environmental Quality Association participated in implementing the initiative. The project included architectural and engineering restoration work, as well as redevelopment of the surrounding area of Tahrir Square. The project was completed by 2016, after restoring the eastern and northern wings, addressing lighting issues, and reorganizing artifact displays.

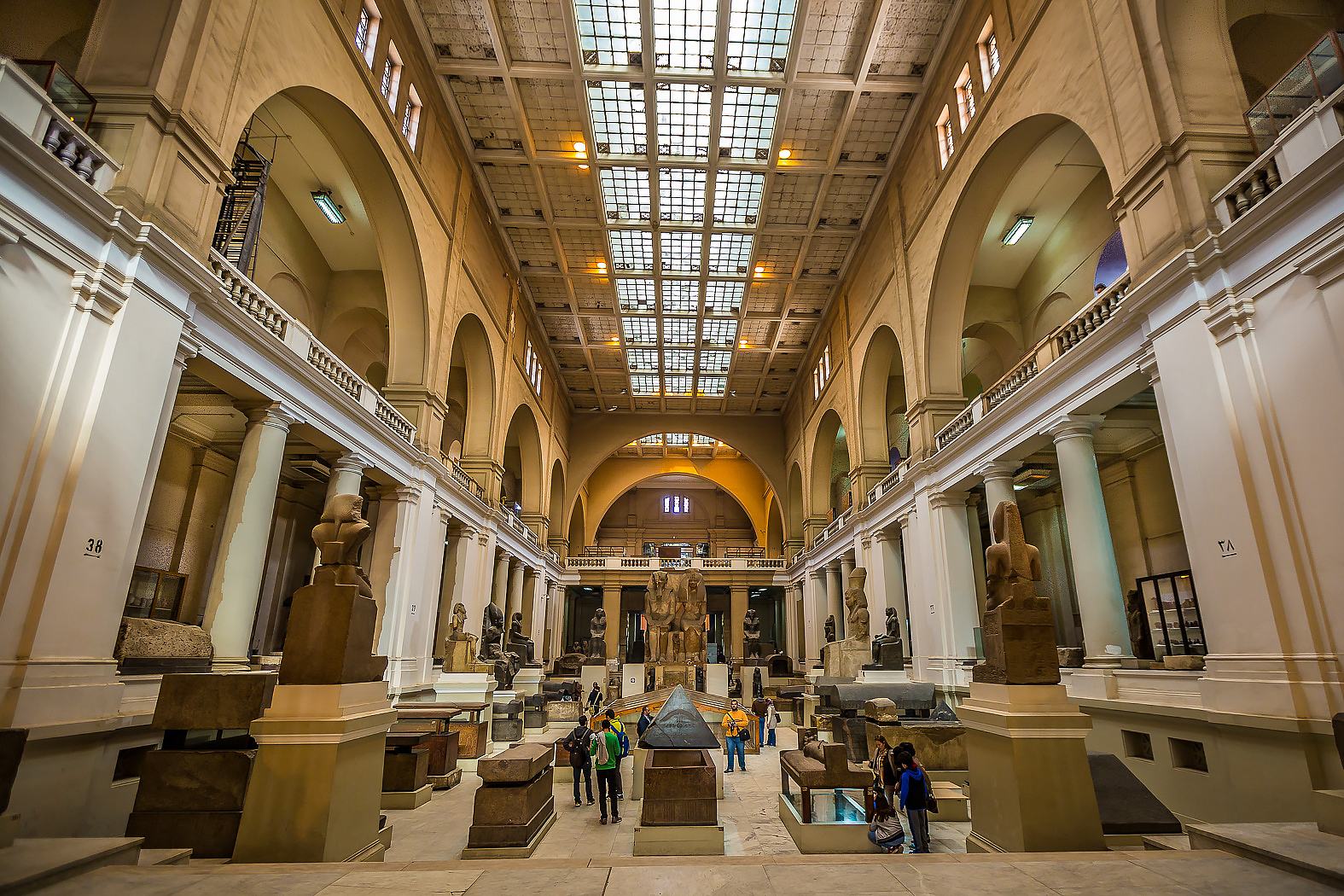
Lighting in the main hall

The first phase involved sampling the original color of the museum building and restoring the walls. It also included wall surface restoration, the restoration of wall and column decorations, the replacement of window glass with UV-protective glass to safeguard the artifacts, and the restoration of the original ventilation system. Restoration work relied on 257 preserved panels within the museum's library, which displayed the building's original designs.

A crane with a warning sign in German in the Egyptian Museum, moving stone objects for relocation to the Grand Egyptian Museum.

In July 2016, the Ministry of Tourism and Antiquities upgraded the museum's internal and external lighting systems, enabling nighttime visits. In November 2018, the final phase was inaugurated, which included a new exhibition layout, the display of the collections of Yuya and Thuya on the upper floor, and King Tutankhamun's artifacts, until the rest of his collection was moved to the Grand Egyptian Museum. The work also involved repainting the walls, upgrading the outlets, updating the lighting system, and restoring display cases. A committee that included directors from the museums of Turin, the Louvre, United Museums, and Berlin oversaw the redistribution of artifacts.

== Museum library ==
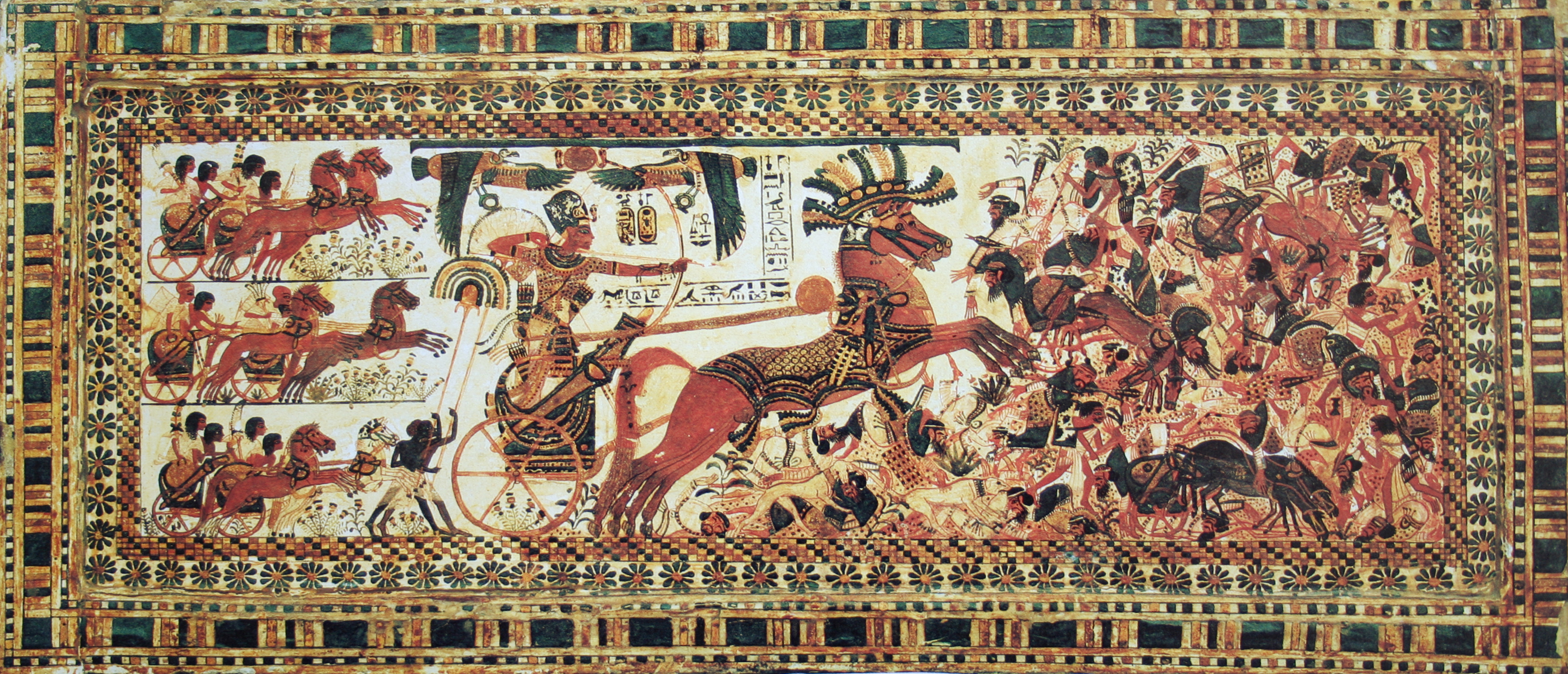
A painting on wood depicting Tutankhamun defeating his enemies

The museum library was established at the museum's opening, with funds allocated since 1899 for the purchase of books. The Egyptologist Maspero advocated for a permanent budget for acquiring books and appointed Dacros as the first librarian from 1903 to 1906. He was succeeded by several librarians, including Monier, who compiled a catalogue of the library's holdings until 1926. Abdel Mohsen El-Khashab later assumed management, assisted by Diaa El-Din Abu Ghazi, who became head librarian in 1950. Abu Ghazi prepared catalogues, increased international exchanges, and expanded the library, which eventually grew to its current two-story size with two reading rooms and a storage area for publications.

The library houses over 50,000 books and volumes, including rare works on ancient Egyptian, Greek, Roman, and Near Eastern archaeology, as well as other specialised fields. Notable holdings include Description de l'Égypte, Antiquités de l'Égypte et de la Nubie, and Lepsius' works. The library also contains a collection of maps, paintings, and photographs.

== Collections ==
- Prehistoric Period: Pottery, jewellery, hunting tools, and everyday items from before the advent of writing. These artefacts reflect the life of early Egyptians who settled in the north, central, and southern parts of the country.
- Early Dynastic Period: Artefacts from the First and Second Dynasties, including the Narmer Palette, the statue of Khasekhemwy, and various vessels and tools.
- Old Kingdom Period: Statues of Djoser, Khafre, Menkaure, Sheikh El-Balad, the dwarf Seneb, King Pepi I, and his son Merenre, as well as coffins, wall paintings, and the collection of Queen Hetepheres I.
- Middle Kingdom Period: The statue of King Montuhotep II, statues of 12th Dynasty rulers including Senusret I and Amenemhat III, and the treasures of princesses Mereret, Sithathoriunet, and Khenmet. Also includes coffins, jewellery, daily life tools, and pyramid fragments from the Faiyum region.

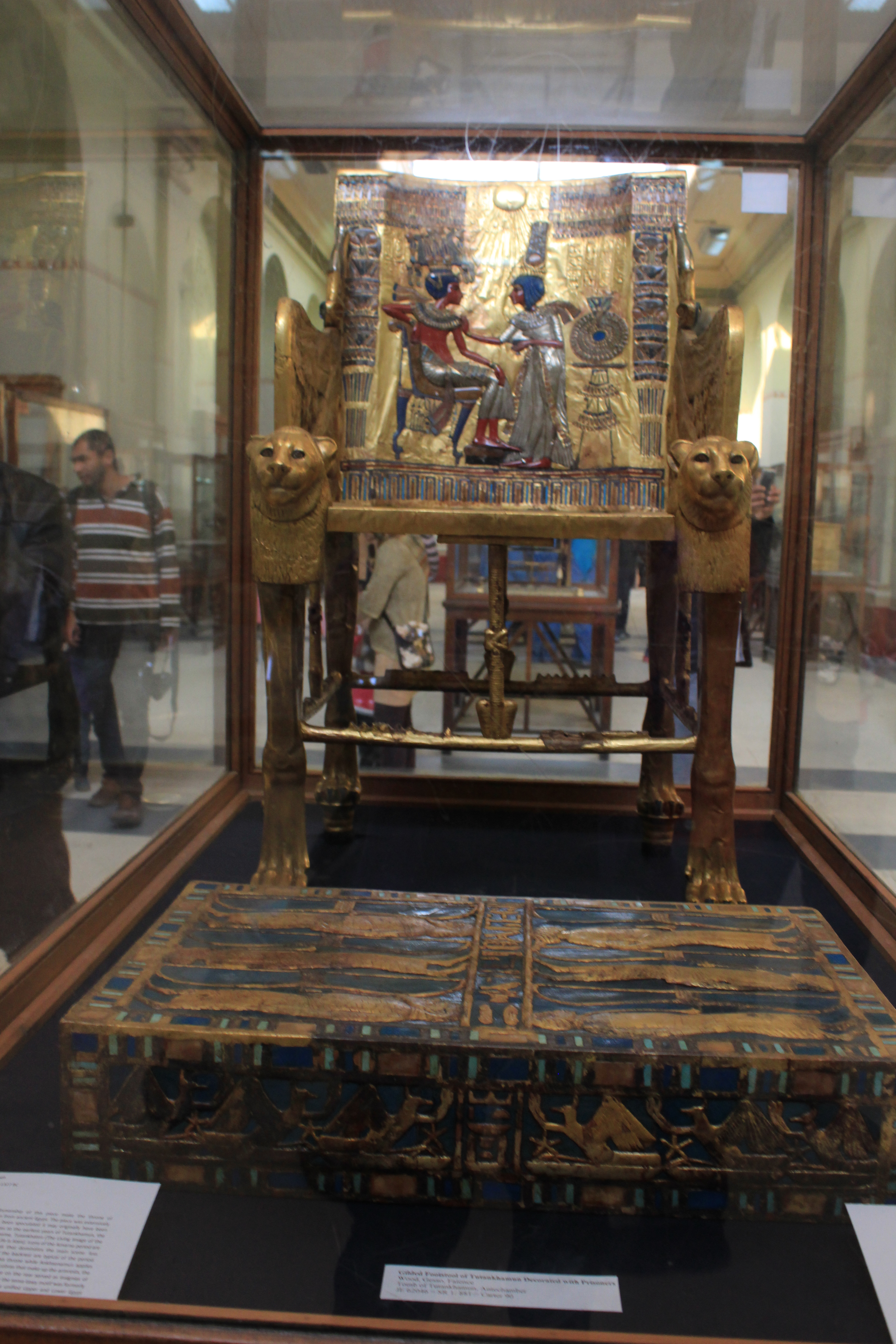
Tutankhamun's throne chair

- New Kingdom Period: The treasures of Tutankhamun, statues of Hatshepsut, Thutmose III, and Ramesses II, chariots, papyri, jewellery, Akhenaten's collection, the Israel Stele, statues of Amenhotep III and his wife Ti, amulets, writing tools, and agricultural instruments. The Royal Mummy Collection was displayed in a dedicated hall opened in 1994 until the mummies were transferred to the National Museum of Egyptian Civilisation in Fustat during the Royal Mummy Parade in 2021.
- Late Period: The treasures of Tanis (gold, silver, and precious stones from the tombs of 21st and 22nd dynasty kings and queens), the funerary masks of Psusennes I, Amenemope, and Shoshenq II, statues of Amun, Mentuhotep, and the goddess Tauret, the Canopus Jar Lid (Abu Qir), the stela of Baiankh, and Nubian artefacts, some of which have been transferred to the Nubian Museum in Aswan.
- Roman Period: Includes the Dush Treasure, discovered in 1989.

== Theft of museum artefacts ==
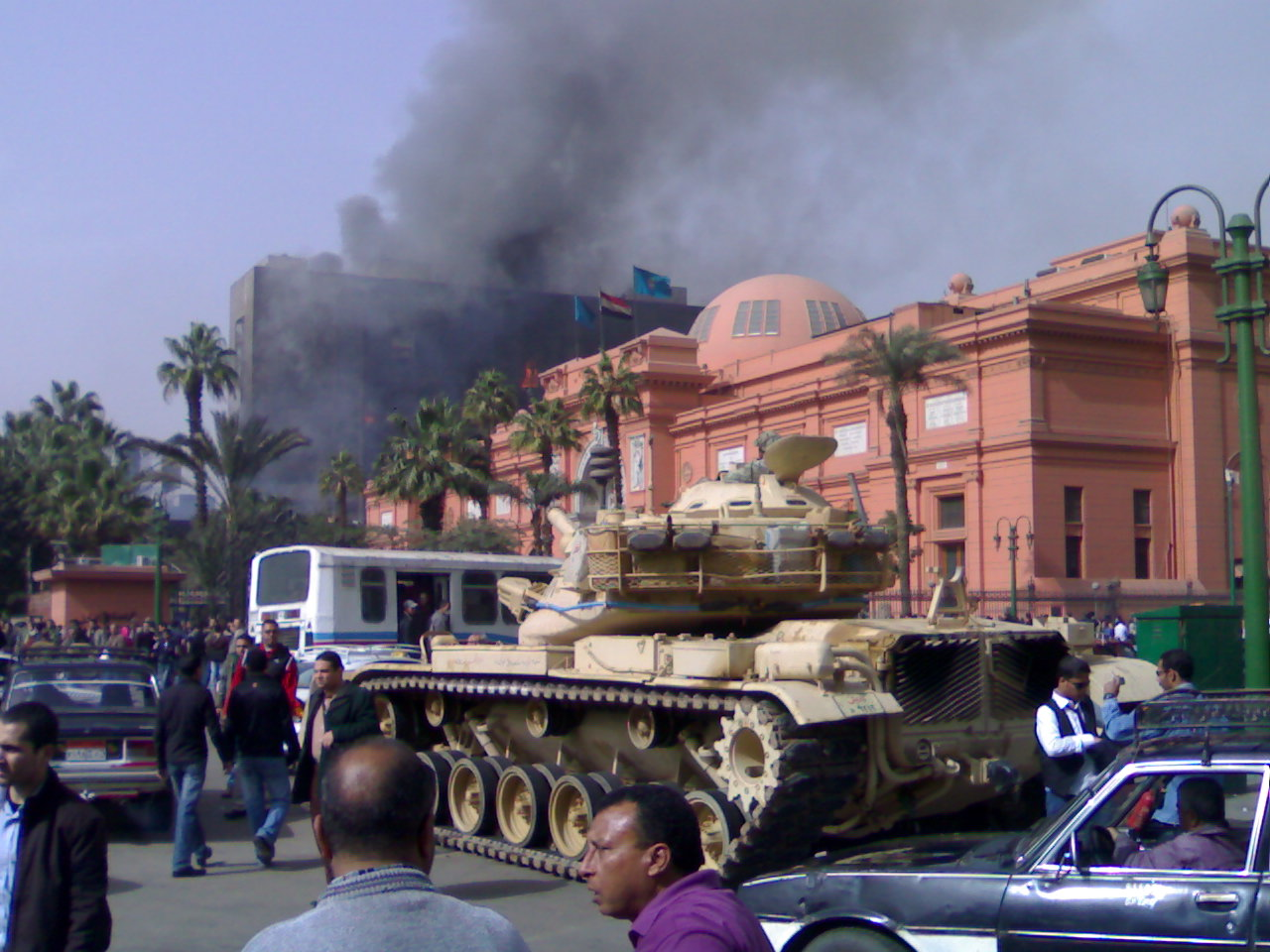
Army forces around the museum

In August 2004, it was announced that 38 artefacts had disappeared from the museum and could not be located. The incident was referred to the public prosecution for investigation.

During the 25 January Revolution, the museum was broken into on 28 January 2011 by unidentified individuals, and 54 artefacts were stolen. Zahi Hawass, then director of the Supreme Council of Antiquities, stated "My heart is broken and my blood is boiling". Hawass later told The New York Times that thieves looking for gold broke 70 objects, including two sculptures of Tutankhamun, and took two skulls from a research lab before being stopped as they left the museum. In response, the military cordoned off the museum to secure it against looting and theft.

In September 2025, authorities announced the theft of a 3,000-year-old gold bracelet dating from the reign of King Amenemope. Four people, including a restoration specialist, were arrested. The specialist confessed to stealing the artefact from a museum safe, then selling it to a succession of jewellers, who then sold it to a gold foundry worker, who melted it down.

== Access to the museum and entry ==
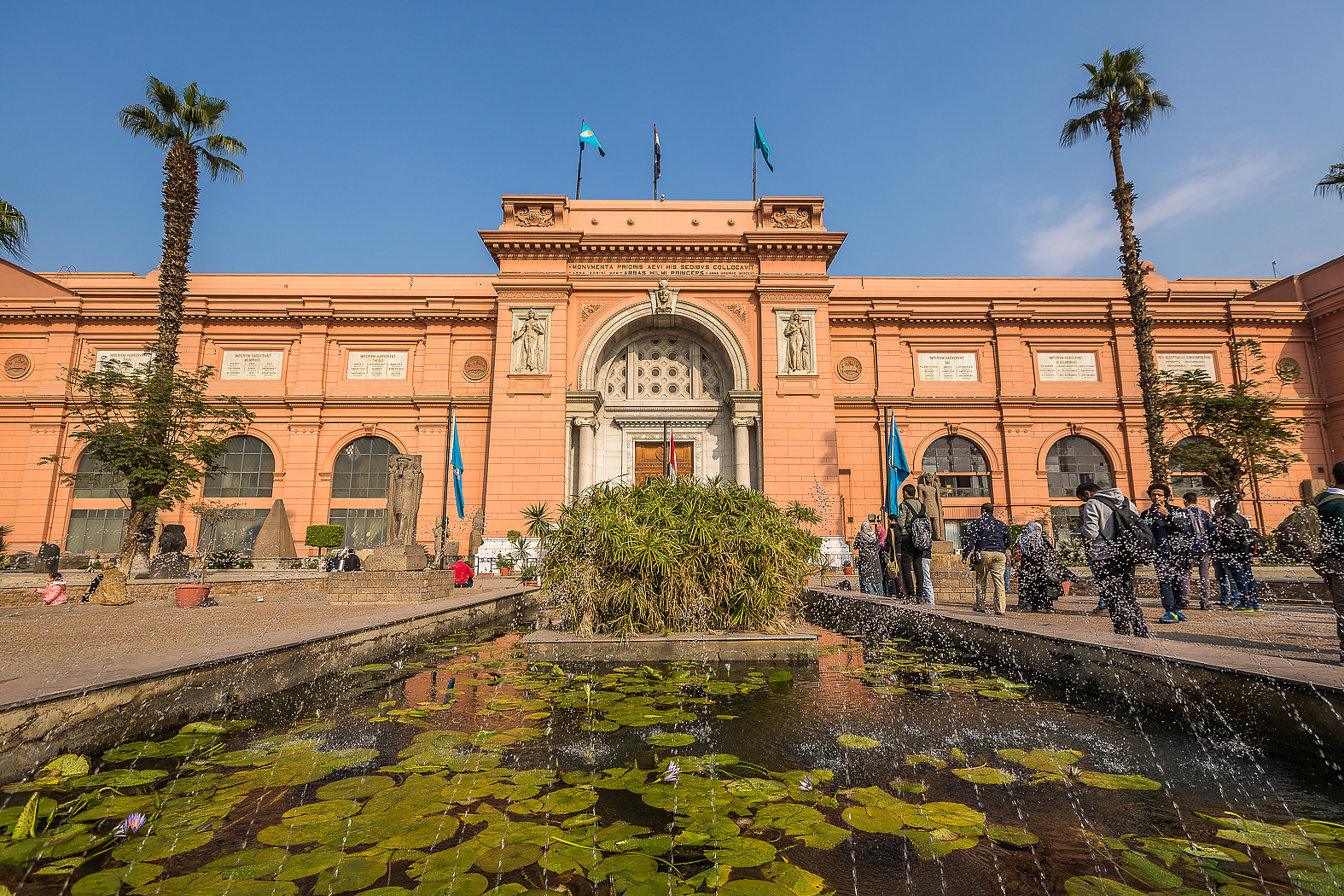
The museum entrance

The museum is on the northern side of Tahrir Square in downtown Cairo. It is accessible by public transportation and by car, with parking at the multi-story Tahrir lot; the nearest metro stop is Sadat Station, on Tahrir Square. The museum is open daily from 9:00 AM to 7:00 PM, with special hours on Fridays from 9:00 AM to 11:00 AM and from 1:30 PM to 7:00 PM. Flash photography is prohibited to protect the artifacts' colors. Personal photography is permitted for a fee of 50 EGP, except in the Hall of the Golden Mask and the Royal Mummy Halls, and is occasionally free on designated days. Audio guides are available for 25 EGP.

=== Antiquities shop ===
The Department of Antiquities (Service d'Antiquités Egyptien) operated a sale room (Salle de ventes) in the Egyptian Museum in Cairo from 1902 in room 56 on the ground floor, where original ancient Egyptian artworks and other original artefacts were sold. In addition, until the 1970s, dealers or collectors could bring antiquities to the Cairo Museum for inspection on Thursdays, and if museum officials had no objections, they could pack them in ready-made boxes, have them sealed and cleared for export. Many objects now held in private collections or public museums originated here. After years of debate about the strategy for selling the antiquities, the sale room was closed in November 1979.

=== Ticket prices ===
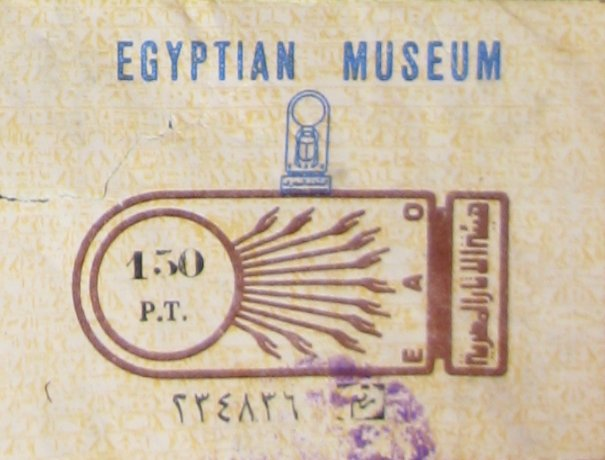
Old museum ticket

The price is in Egyptian pounds.

| Places to visit | Students | Adult |
|---|---|---|
Ticket price
| Egyptians and Arabs | 10 | 30 |
| Foreigners | 275 | 550 |

Free entrance for children under 6 years

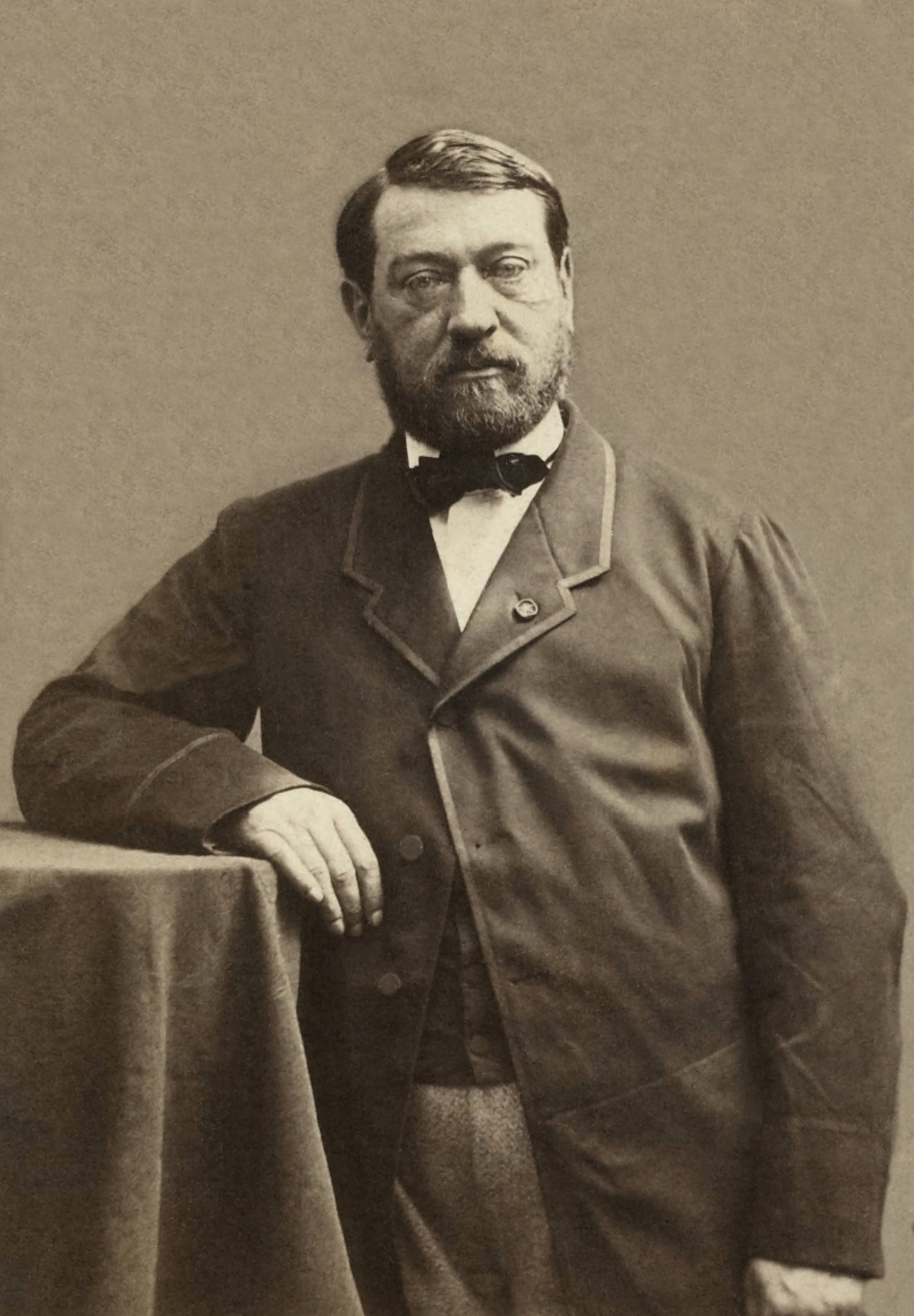
Auguste Mariette

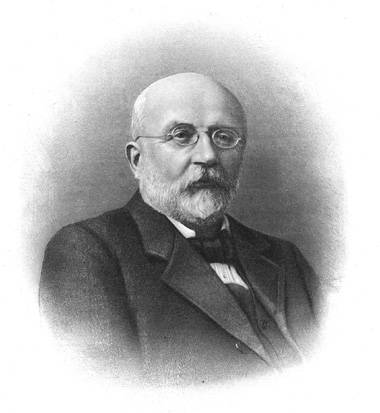
Gaston Maspero

== Administration ==
The museum is overseen by the Museums Sector of the Supreme Council of Antiquities, which is part of the Ministry of Tourism and Antiquities (Egypt). The management of the museum is entrusted to the position of museum director, a role held by several prominent figures in the field of Egyptology, including:

- Auguste Mariette (1858–1881)
- Gaston Maspero (1881–1886)
- Eugène Grébaut (1886–1892)
- Jacques de Morgan (1892–1897)
- Victor Loret (1897–1899)
- Gaston Maspero (1899–1914)
- Pierre Lacau (1914–1936)
- Étienne Drioton (1936–1952)
- Mahmoud Hamza
- Henry Riad
- Diaa al-Din Abu Ghazi
- Muhammad Mohsen
- Muhammad Saleh
- Ali Hassan
- Mamdouh Eldamaty (2001–2004)
- Wafaa al-Siddiq (2004–2011)
- Tarek al-Awadi (2011–2012)
- Sayed Hassan (2012)
- Salwa Abdel Rahman (2012–2013)
- Sayed Amer (2013–2014)
- Mahmoud Halougi (2014–2015)
- Khaled al-Anani (2015–2016)
- Somaya Abdel Samia (March 2016–September 2016)
- Sabah Abdel Razek (September 2016 – 2023)
- Ali Abdelhalim Ali (2023–present)

== Layout and collections ==
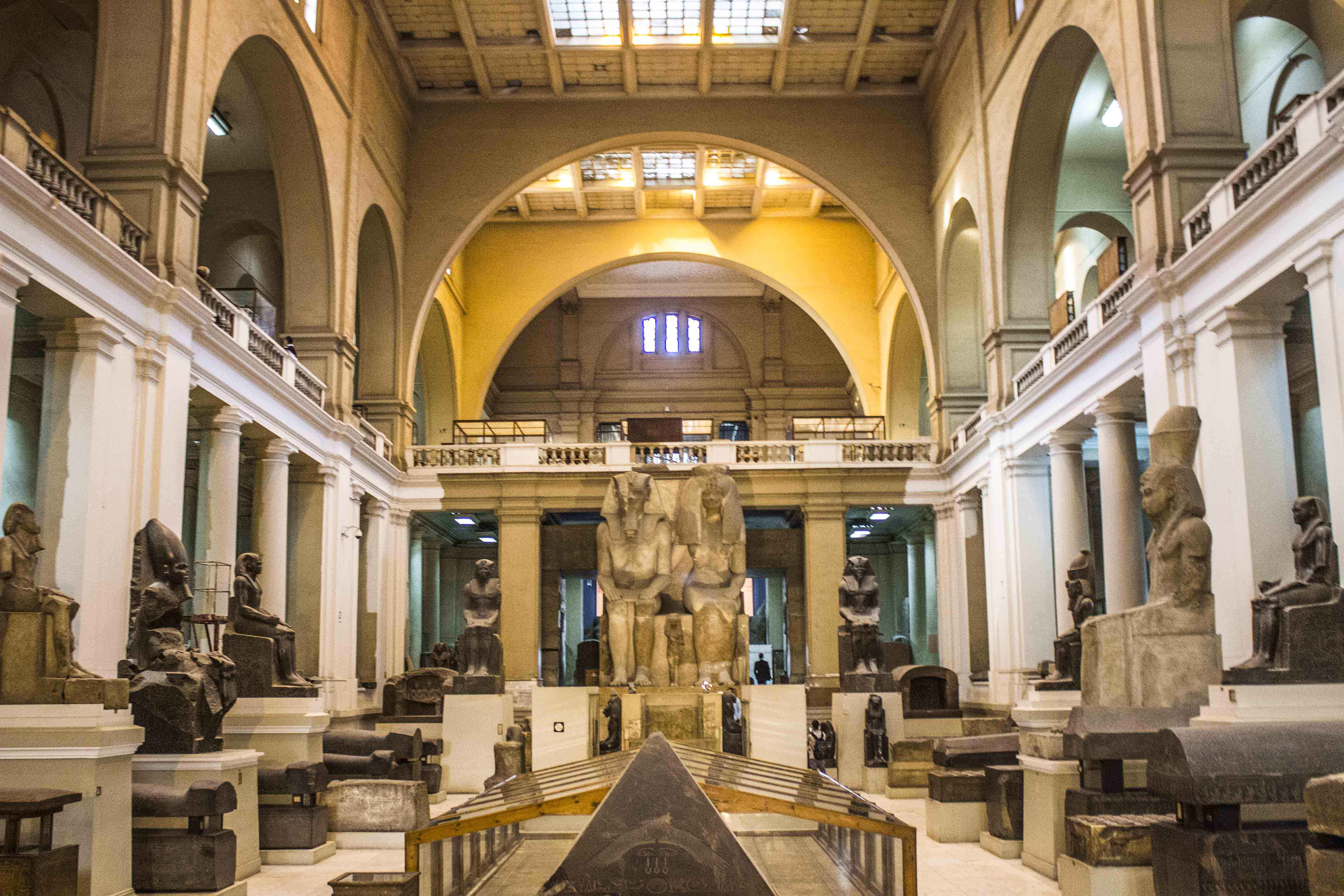
Interior of the Egyptian Museum

The museum has two main floors: the ground floor and the first floor. On the ground floor is a collection of large-scale works in stone, including statues, reliefs, and architectural elements. These are arranged chronologically in a clockwise fashion, from the pre-dynastic to the Greco-Roman period. The first floor is dedicated to smaller works, including papyri, coins, textiles, and a collection of wooden sarcophagi.

The numerous pieces of papyrus are generally small fragments, owing to their decay over the past two millennia. Several languages are found on these pieces, including Greek, Latin, Arabic, and ancient Egyptian. The coins found on this floor are made of many different metals, including gold, silver, and bronze. The coins are not only Egyptian, but also Greek, Roman, and Islamic. This has helped historians research Ancient Egyptian trade.

Also on the ground floor are artefacts from the New Kingdom (1550–1069 BC), generally larger than those of earlier periods, including statues, tables, and sarcophagi. The ground floor contains 42 rooms displaying items ranging from sarcophagi and boats to enormous statues.

On the first floor are artefacts from the final two dynasties of Egypt, including items from the tombs of the Pharaohs Thutmosis III, Thutmosis IV, Amenophis II, Hatshepsut, and the courtier Maiherpri, as well as many artefacts from the Valley of the Kings, in particular the material from the intact tombs of Tutankhamun and Psusennes I.

Until 2021, two rooms contained several mummies of kings and other members of the New Kingdom's royal family. On 3 April 2021, twenty-two of these mummies were transferred to the National Museum of Egyptian Civilization in Fustat in a grand parade dubbed The Pharaohs' Golden Parade.

Collections are also being transferred to the Grand Egyptian Museum in Giza, including all the artefacts found inside Tutankhamun's tomb. "Among the reasons that the GEM itself was conceived, the Egyptian Museum in Tahrir has been criticized for being overcrowded, displaying pieces in a way that is said to make the experience cumbersome for visitors."

== Memorial to famous Egyptologists ==
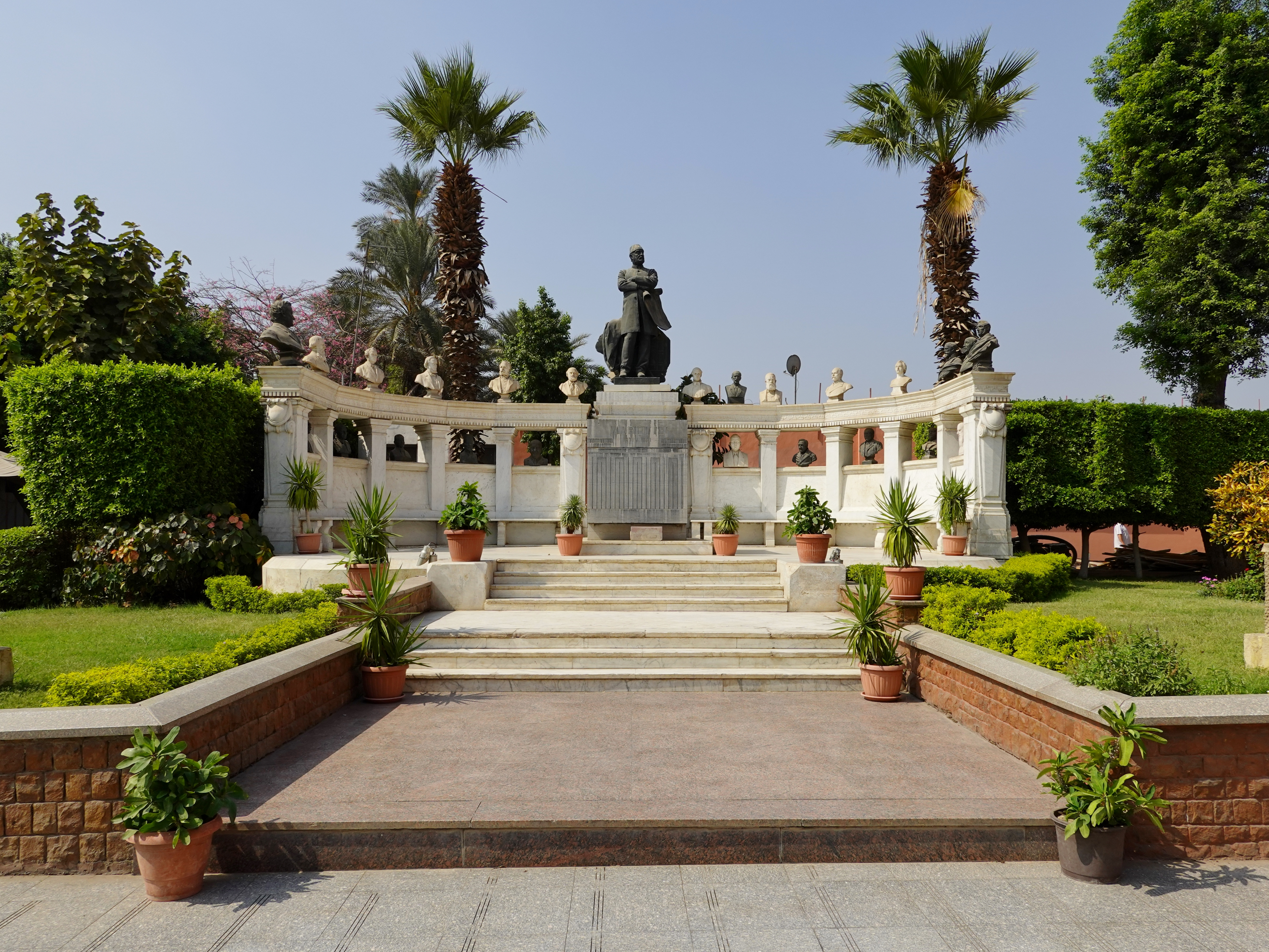
Memorial to famous Egyptologists

In the garden adjacent to the building of the museum, is a memorial to famous egyptologists of the world. It features a monument to Auguste Mariette, surrounded by 24 busts of the following egyptologists: François Chabas, Johannes Dümichen, Conradus Leemans, Charles Wycliffe Goodwin, Emmanuel de Rougé, Samuel Birch, Edward Hincks, Luigi Vassalli, Émile Brugsch, Karl Richard Lepsius, Théodule Devéria, Vladimir Golenishchev, Ippolito Rosellini, Labib Habachi, Sami Gabra, Selim Hassan, Ahmed Kamal, Zakaria Goneim, Jean-François Champollion, Amedeo Peyron, Willem Pleyte, Gaston Maspero, Peter le Page Renouf and Kazimierz Michałowski.

== Pharaohs' Golden Parade ==
On 3 April 2021, 22 royal mummies (18 kings and 4 queens) were transferred from the Egyptian Museum to the National Museum of Egyptian Civilization in Fustat as part of the Pharaohs' Golden Parade. During the parade, roads leading to or near the two museums were closed and under heavy security.

In order to be transported, the mummies were placed in containers with a nitrogen atmosphere. Egyptian funerary boats were made for the event, which appeared several times during the event on the lake in front of the National Museum of Egyptian Civilization. The decoration was based on Egyptian funerary boats.

== Gallery ==
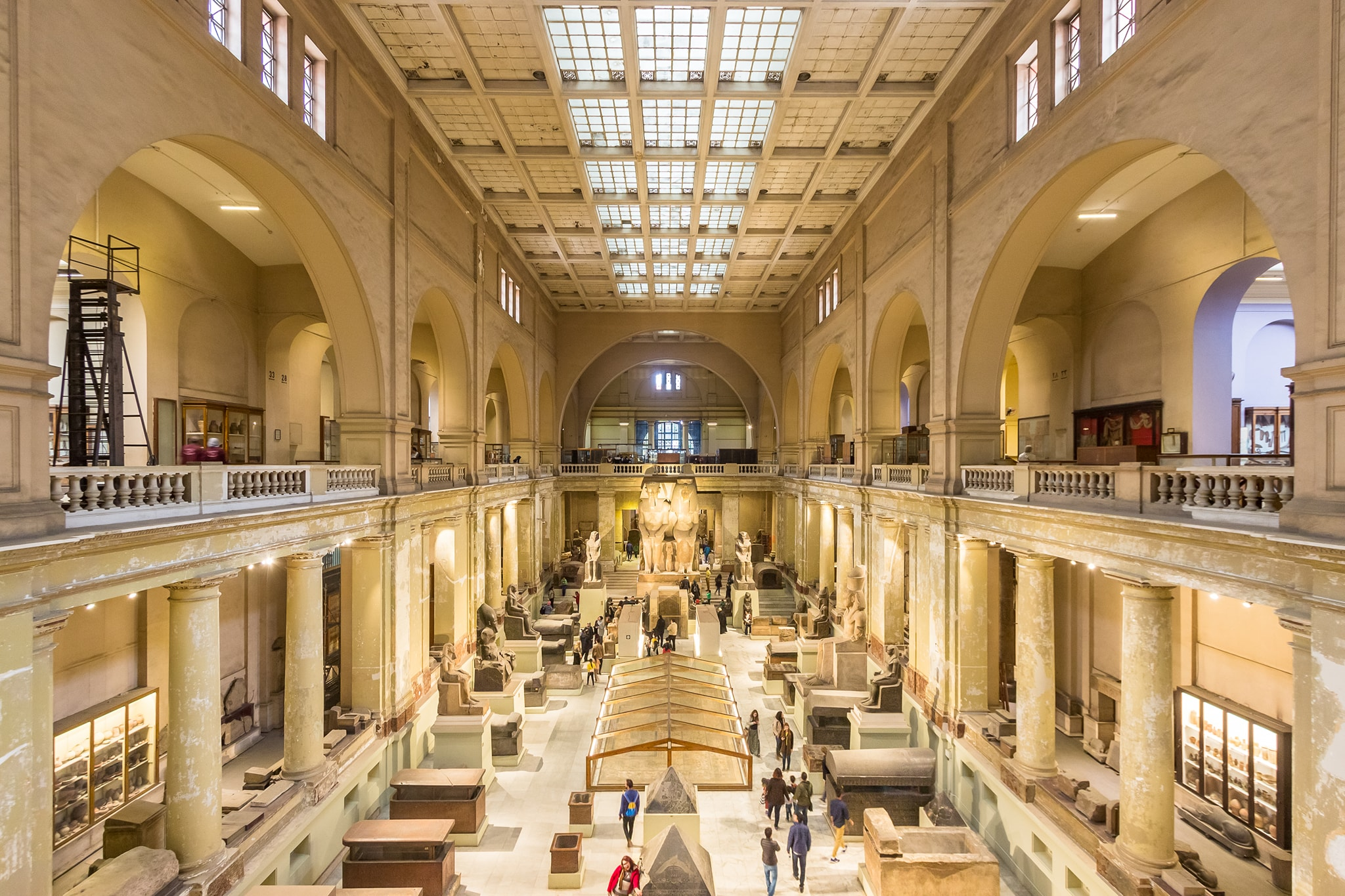
Main hall

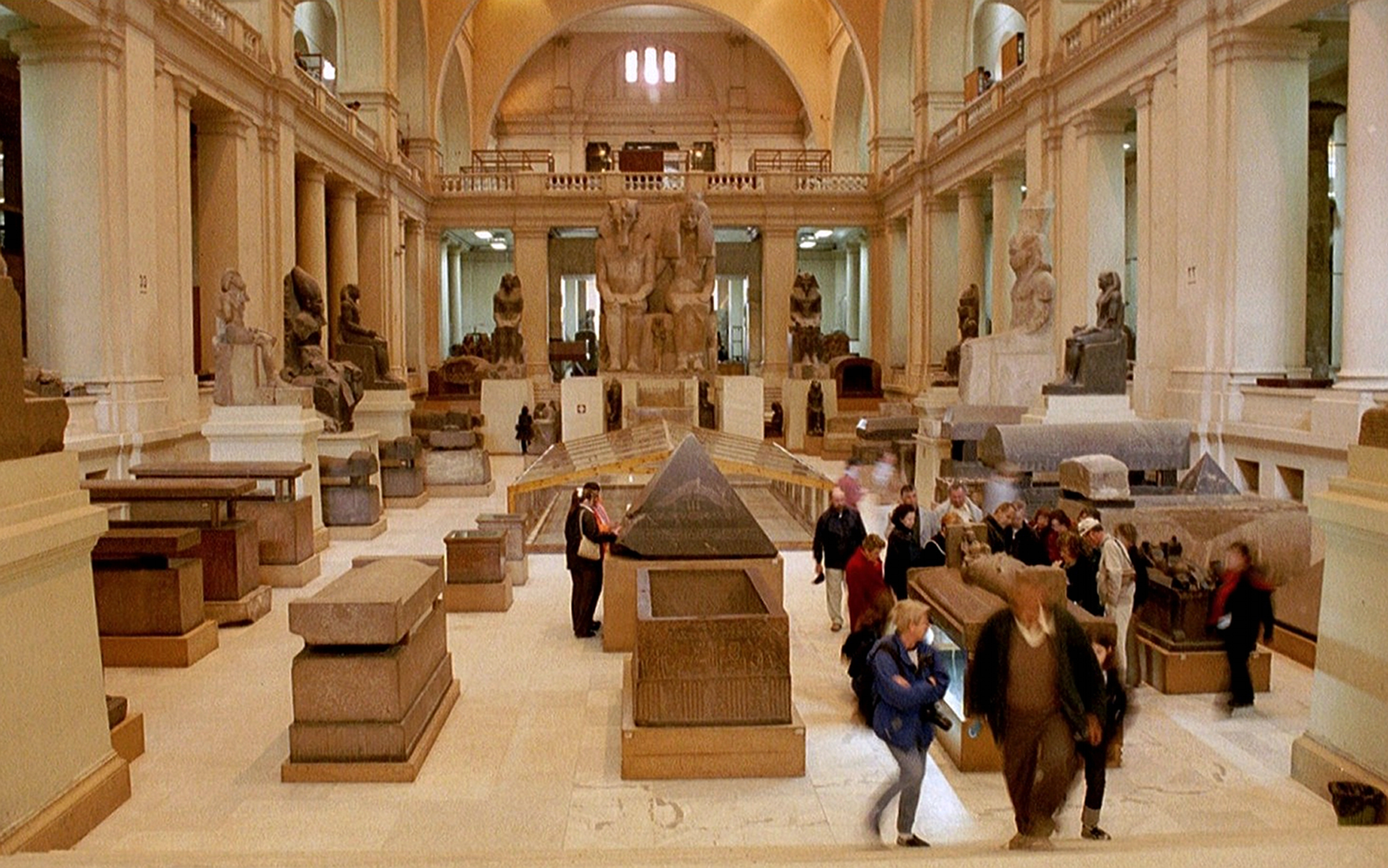
Main hall

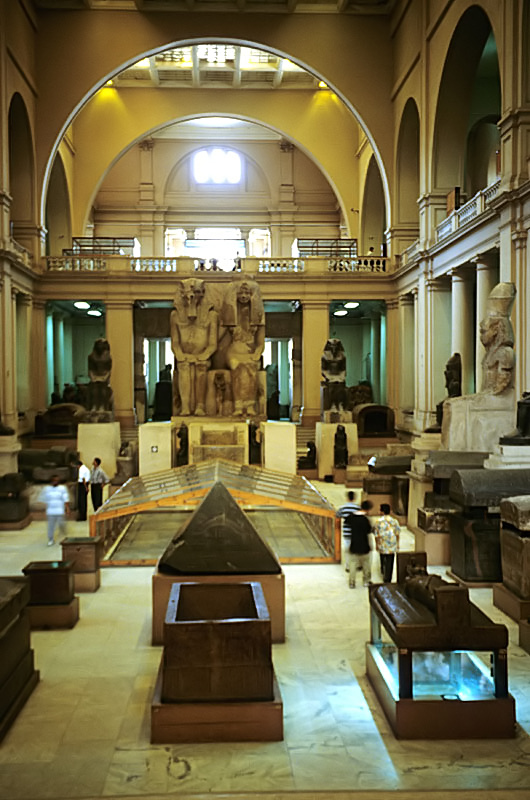
Main hall

Mummy mask of Hor Awibre of the 13th dynasty

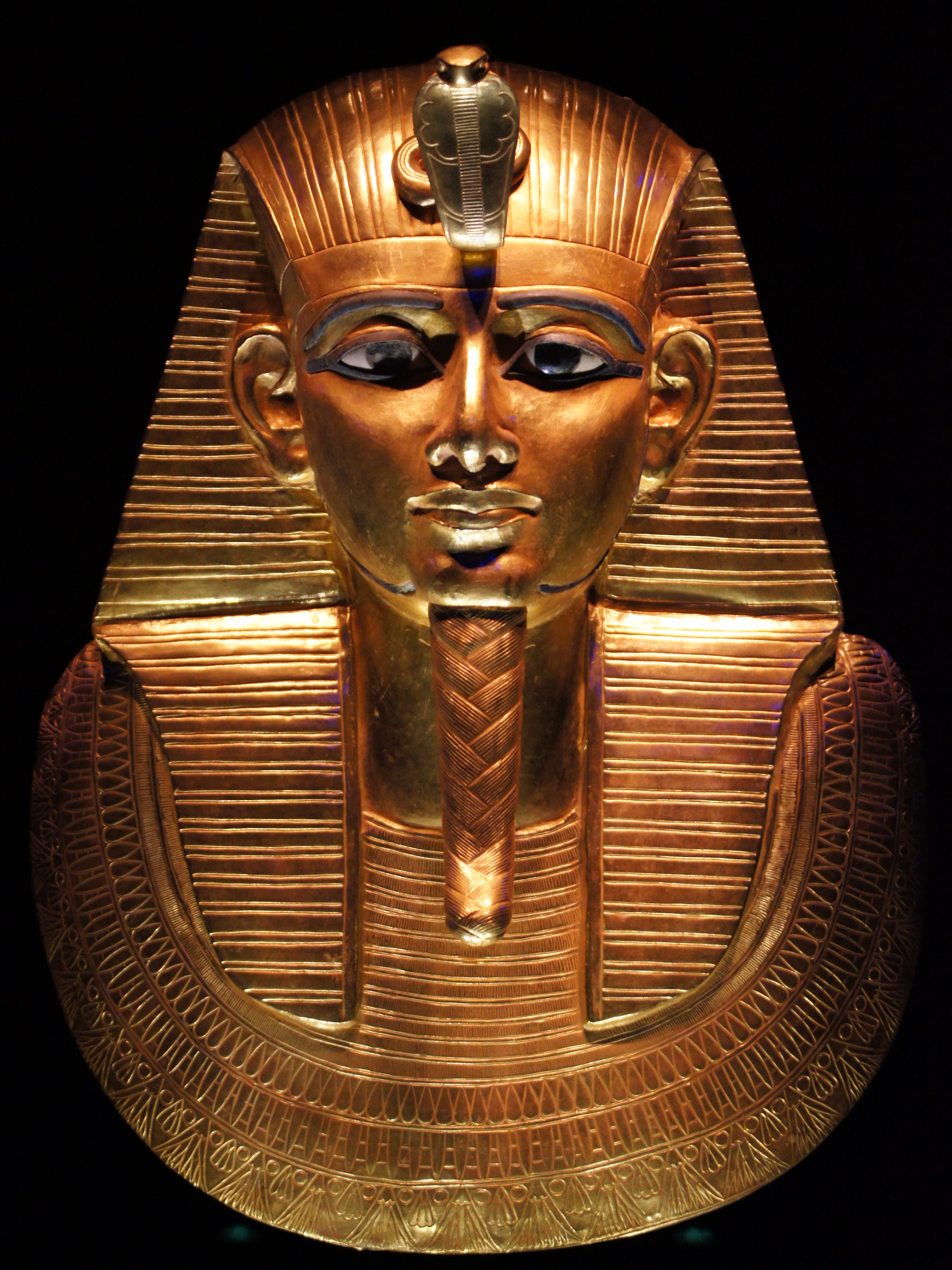
Mummy mask of Psusennes I of the 21st dynasty

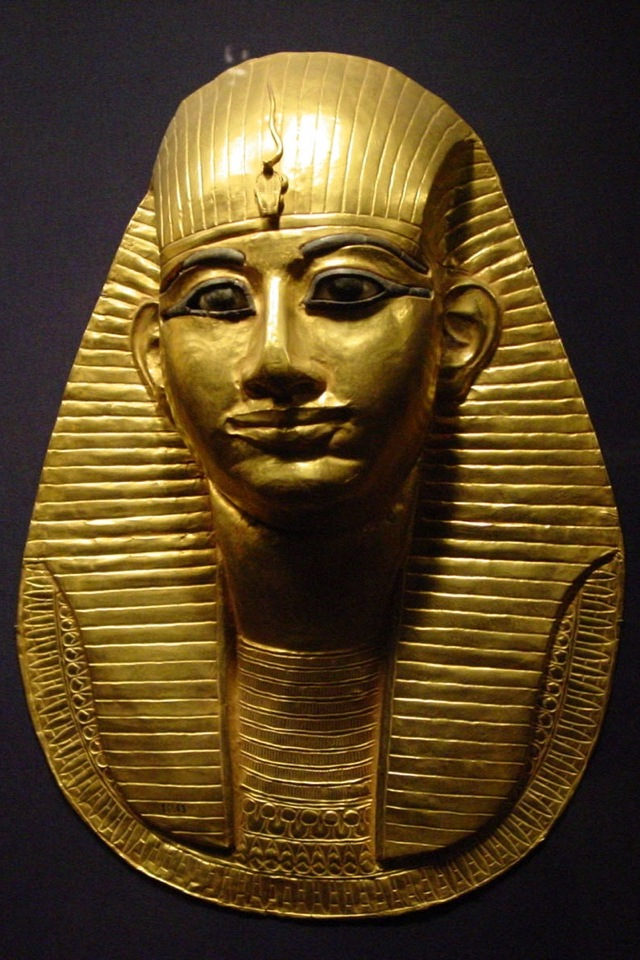
Mummy mask of king Amenemope of the 21st dynasty

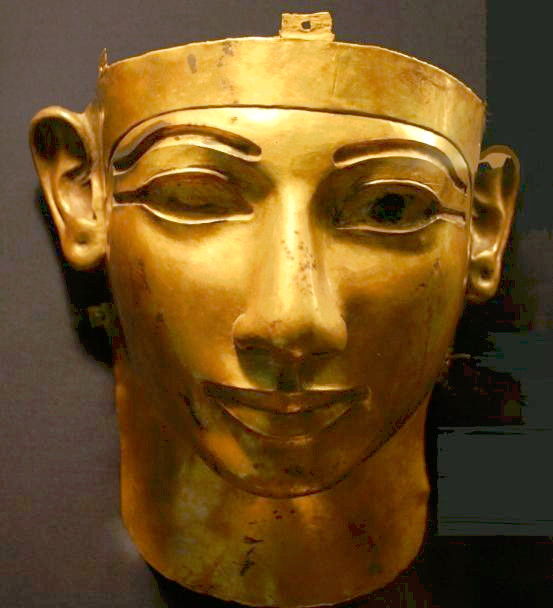
Mummy mask of Shoshenq II of the 22nd dynasty

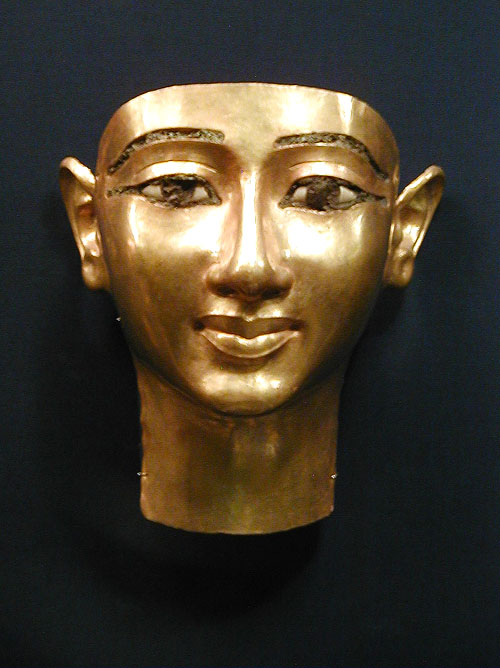
Mummy mask of Wendjebauendjed

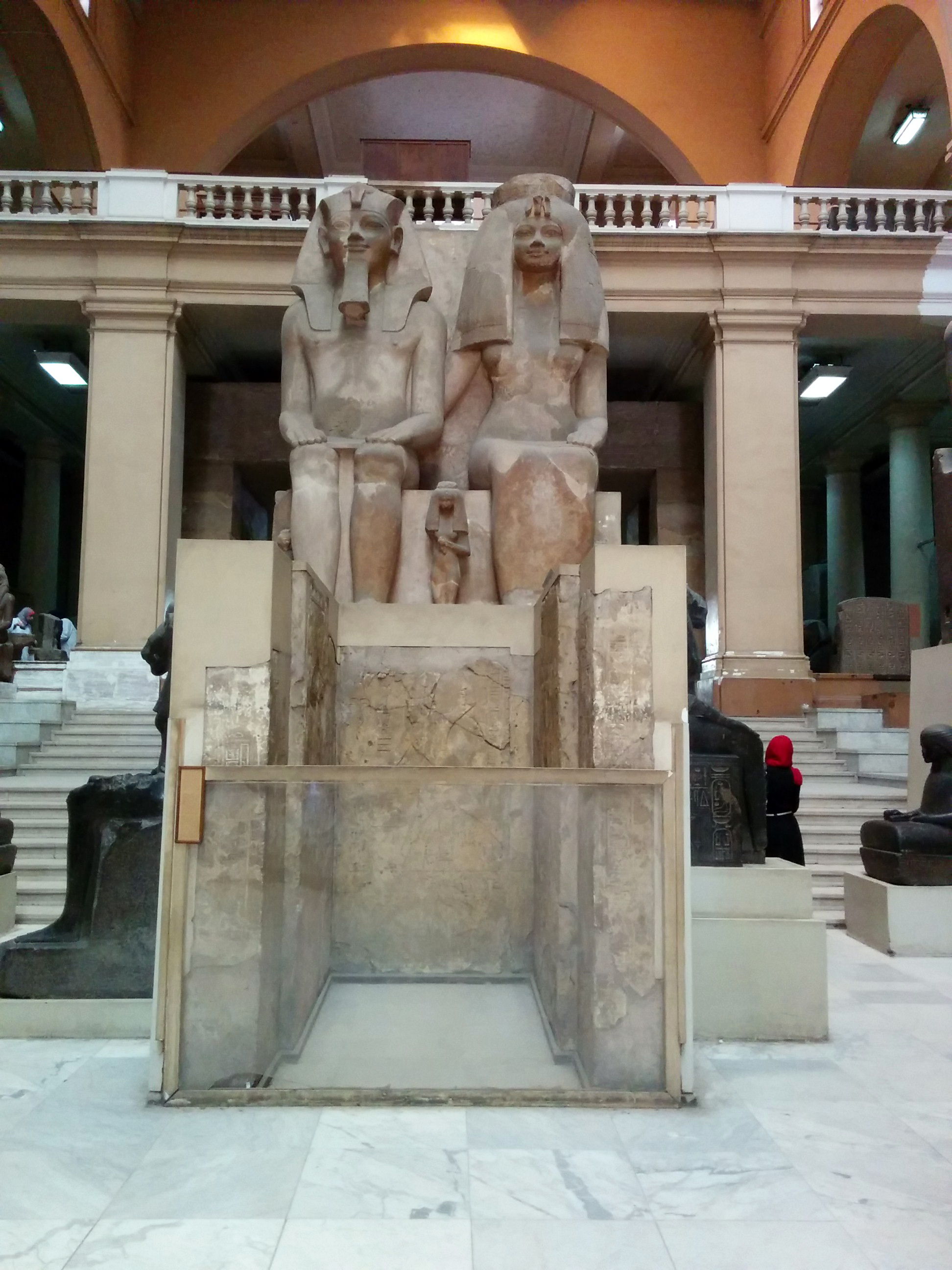
Colossal statue of Amenhotep III and Tiye

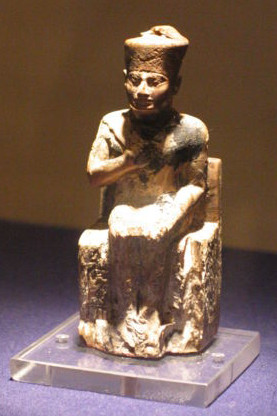
Khufu Statuette, an ivory figurine of Khufu

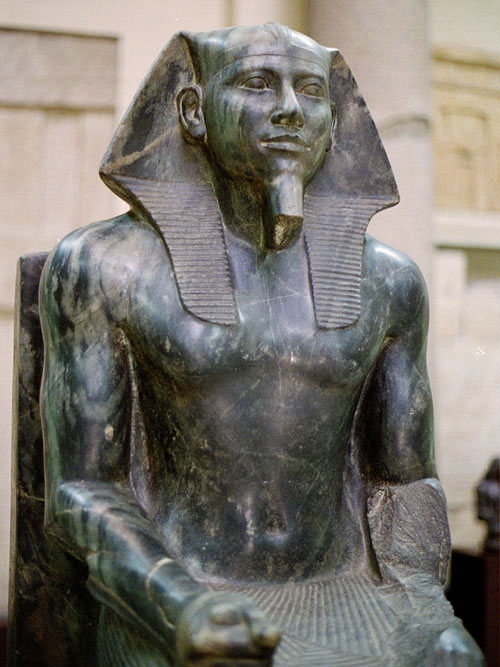
Khafre Enthroned

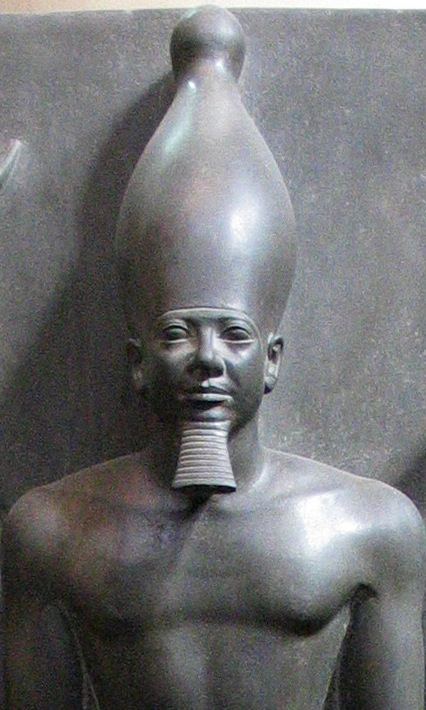
Statue of Menkaure

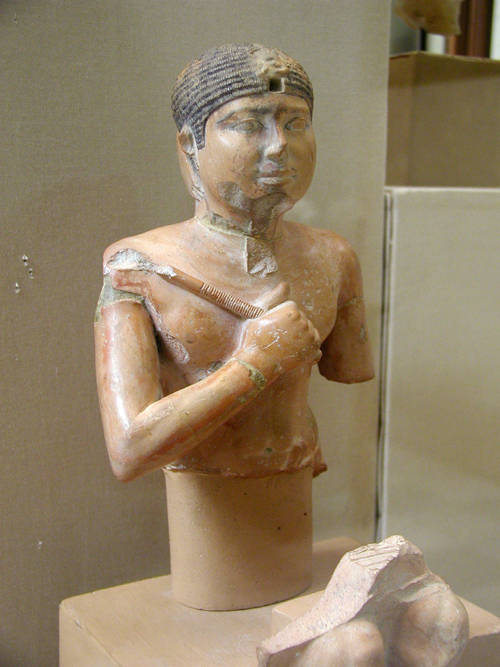
Statuette of Neferefre

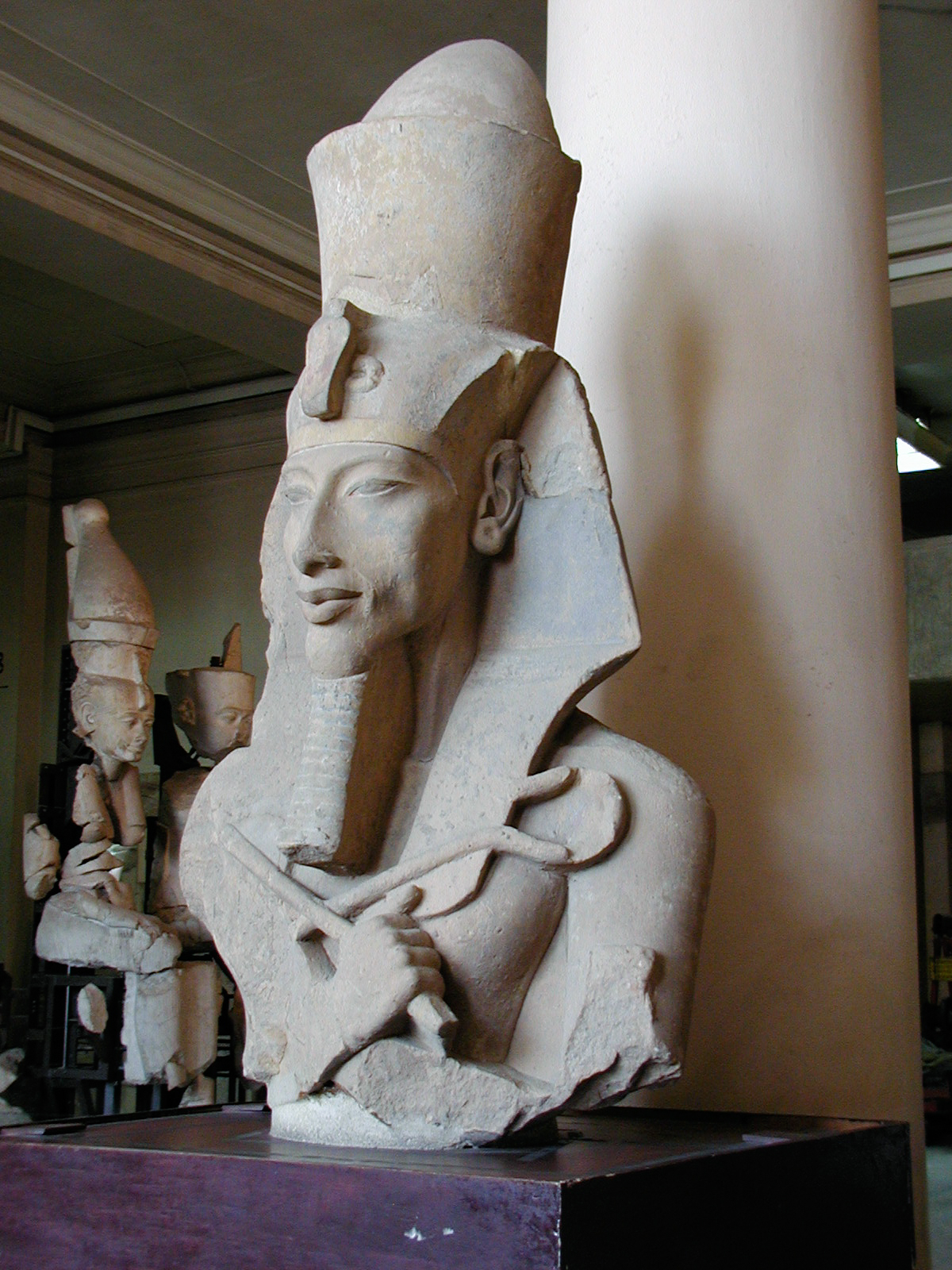
Bust of Akhenaten

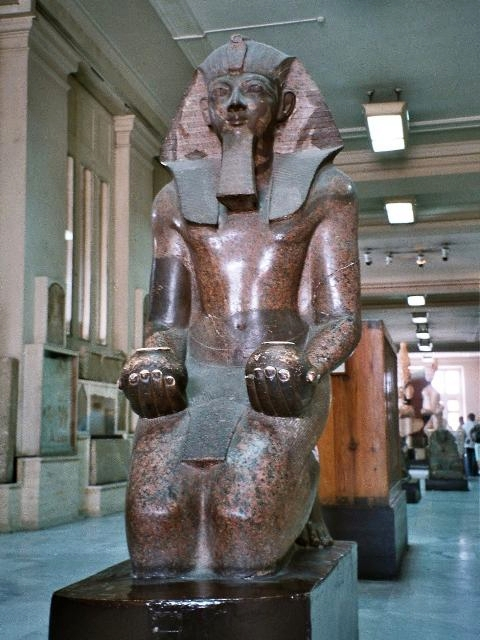
Statue of Hatshepsut

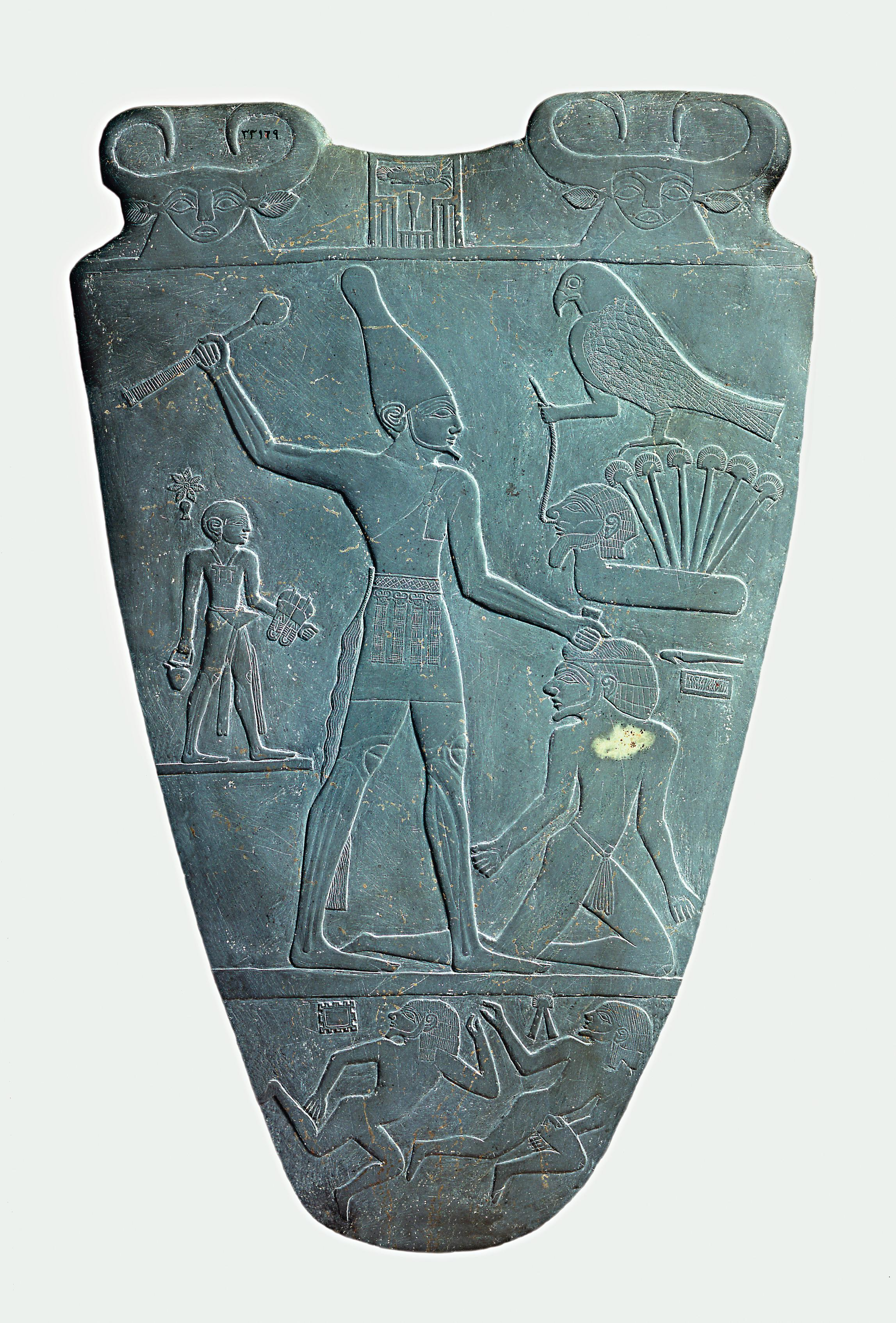
Narmer Palette

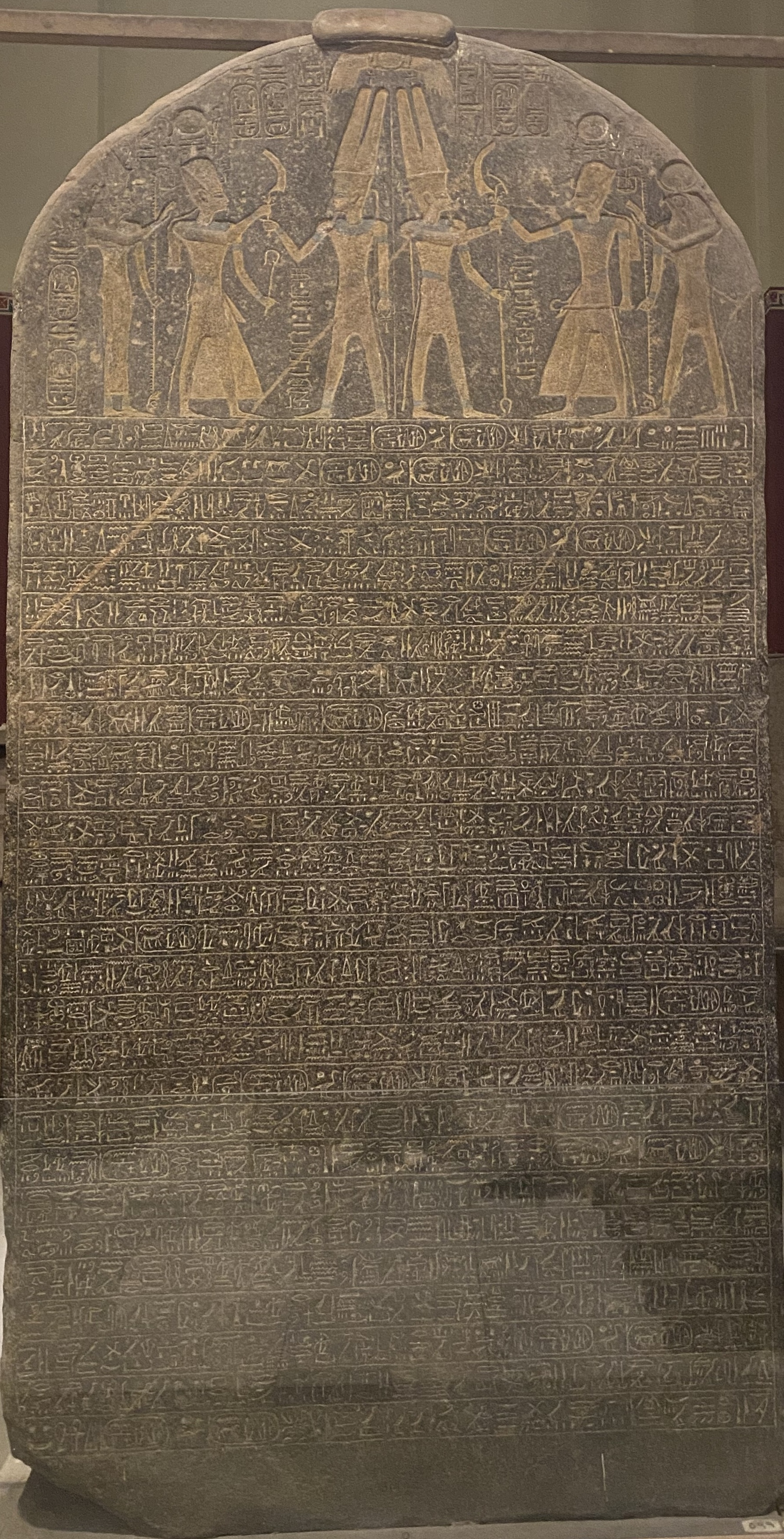
Merneptah Stele

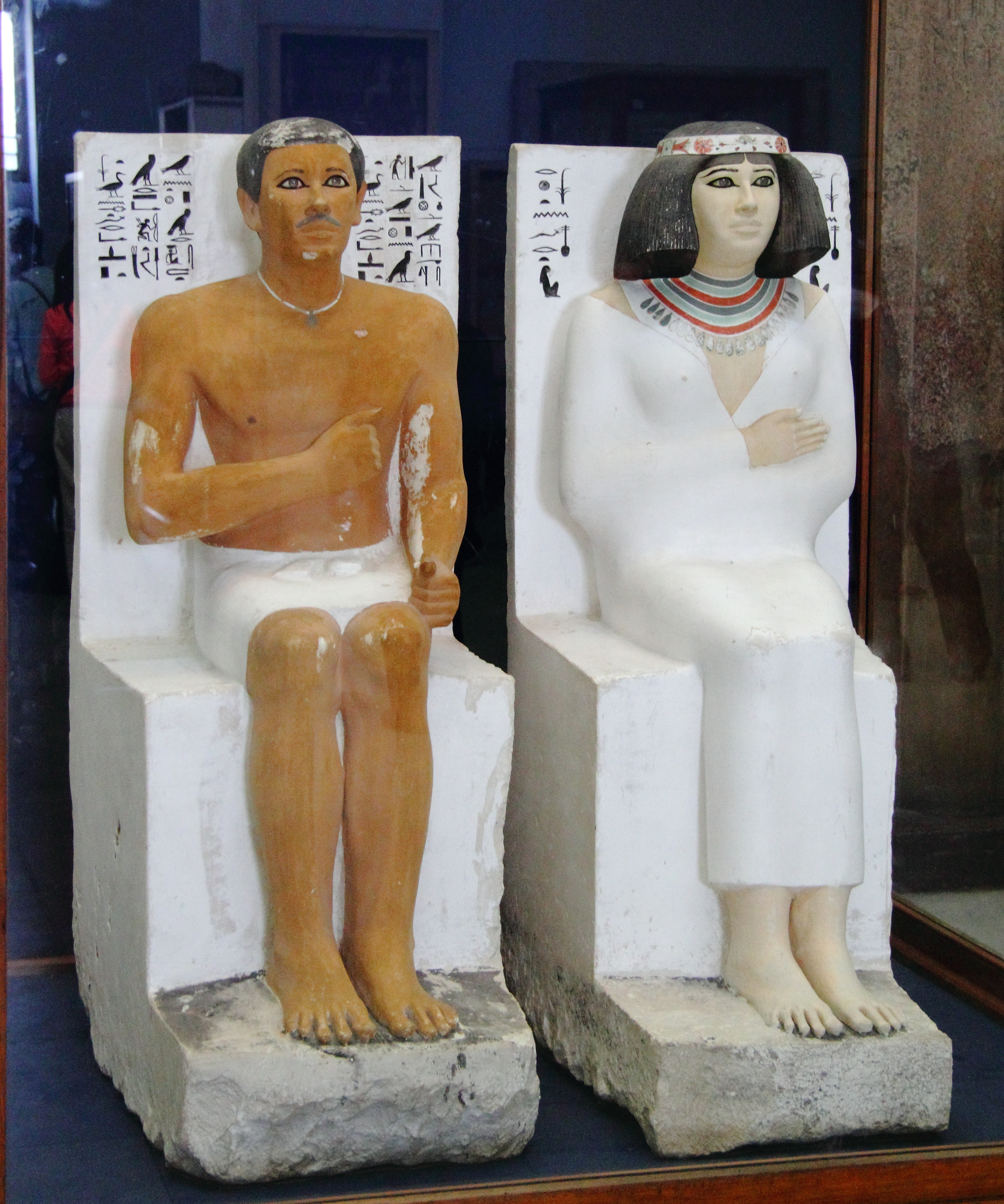
Prince Rahotep and Nofret (2575-2550 BC)

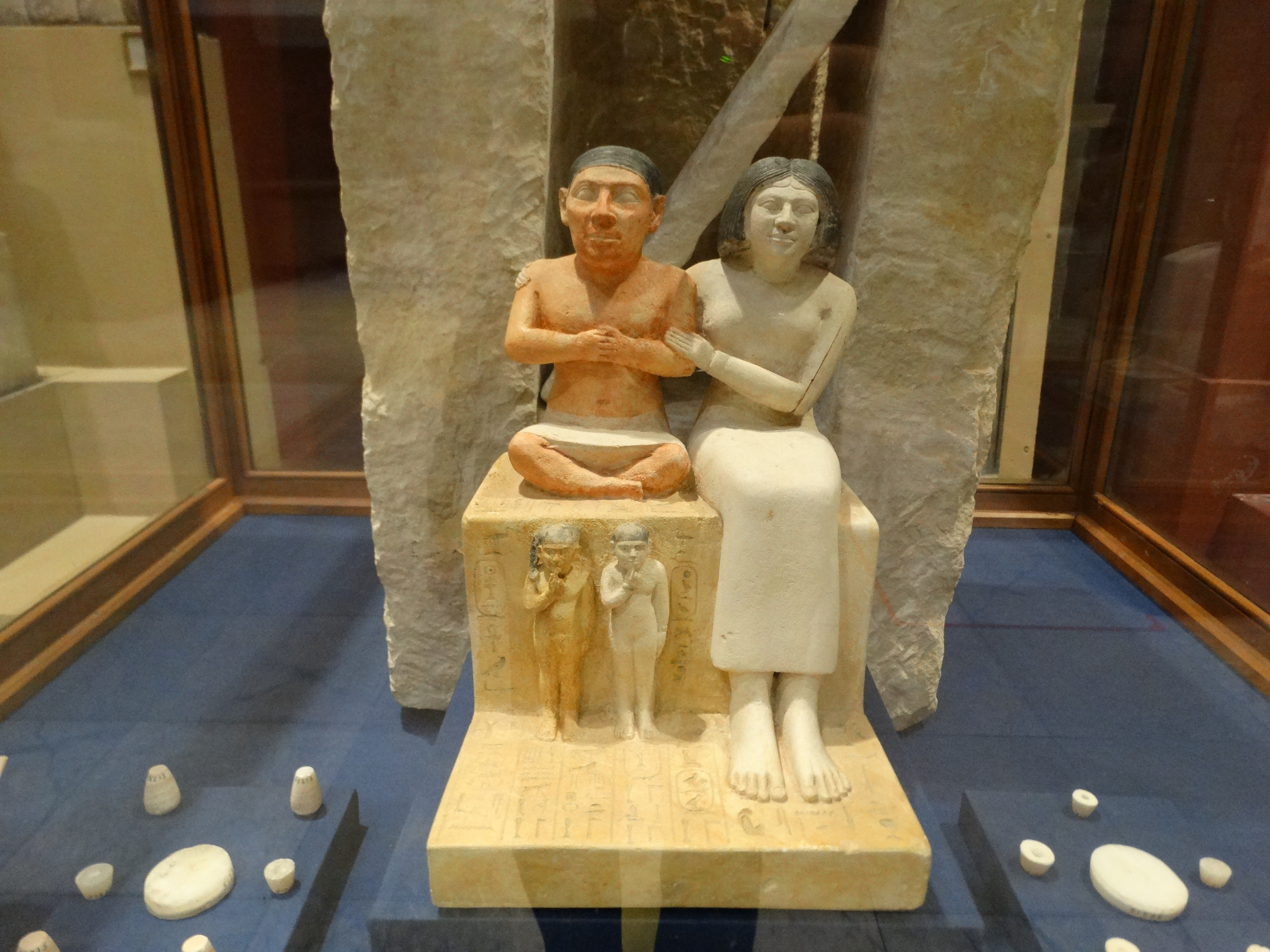
Dwarf Seneb with his wife (2400-2500 BC)

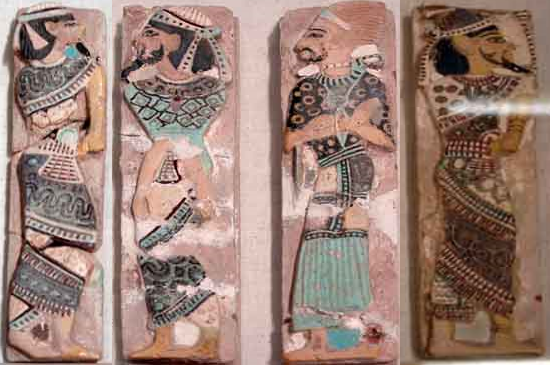
Ramesses III prisoner tiles

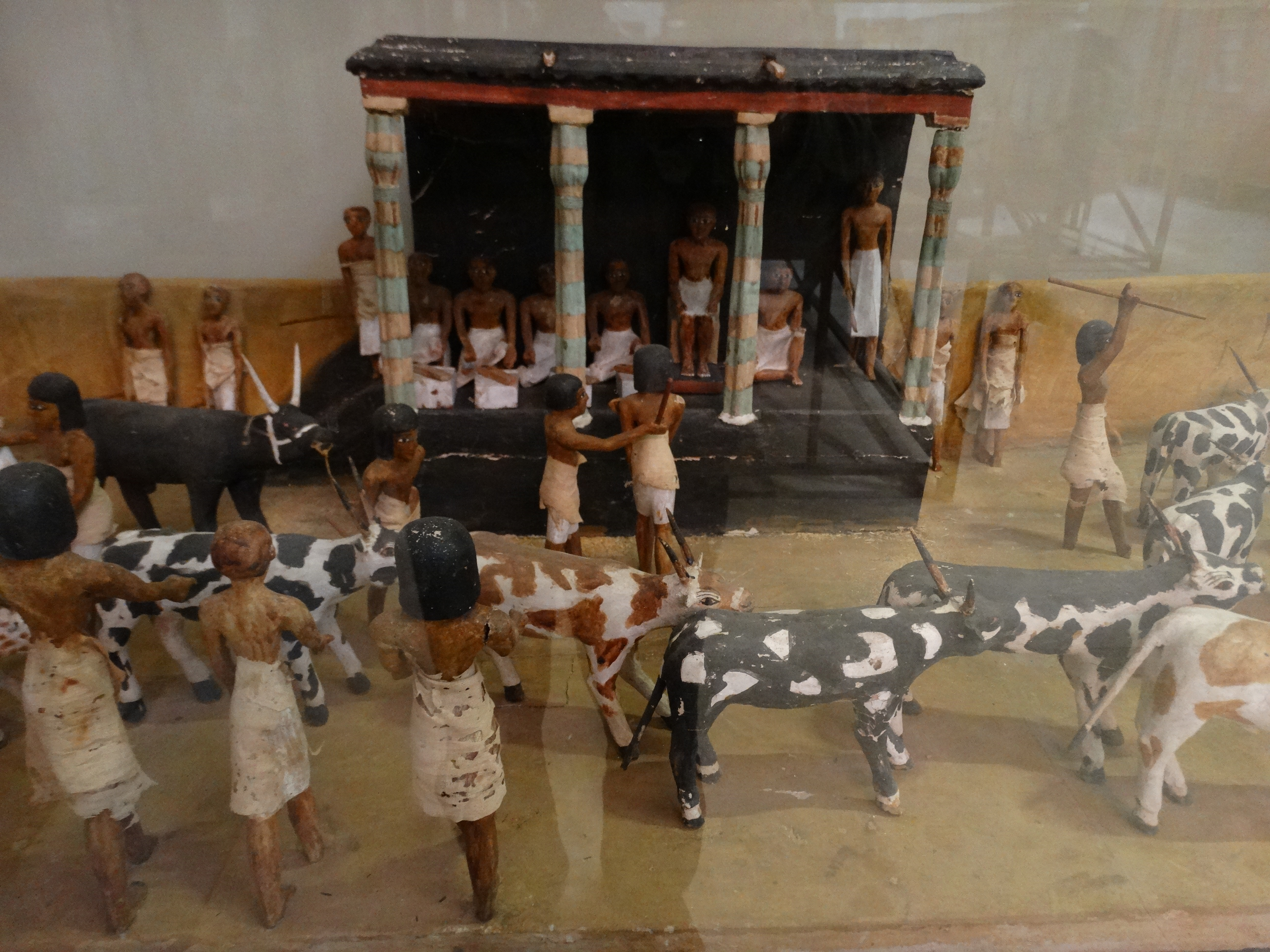
Wood sculptural composition depicting a cattle census scene (2000 BC)

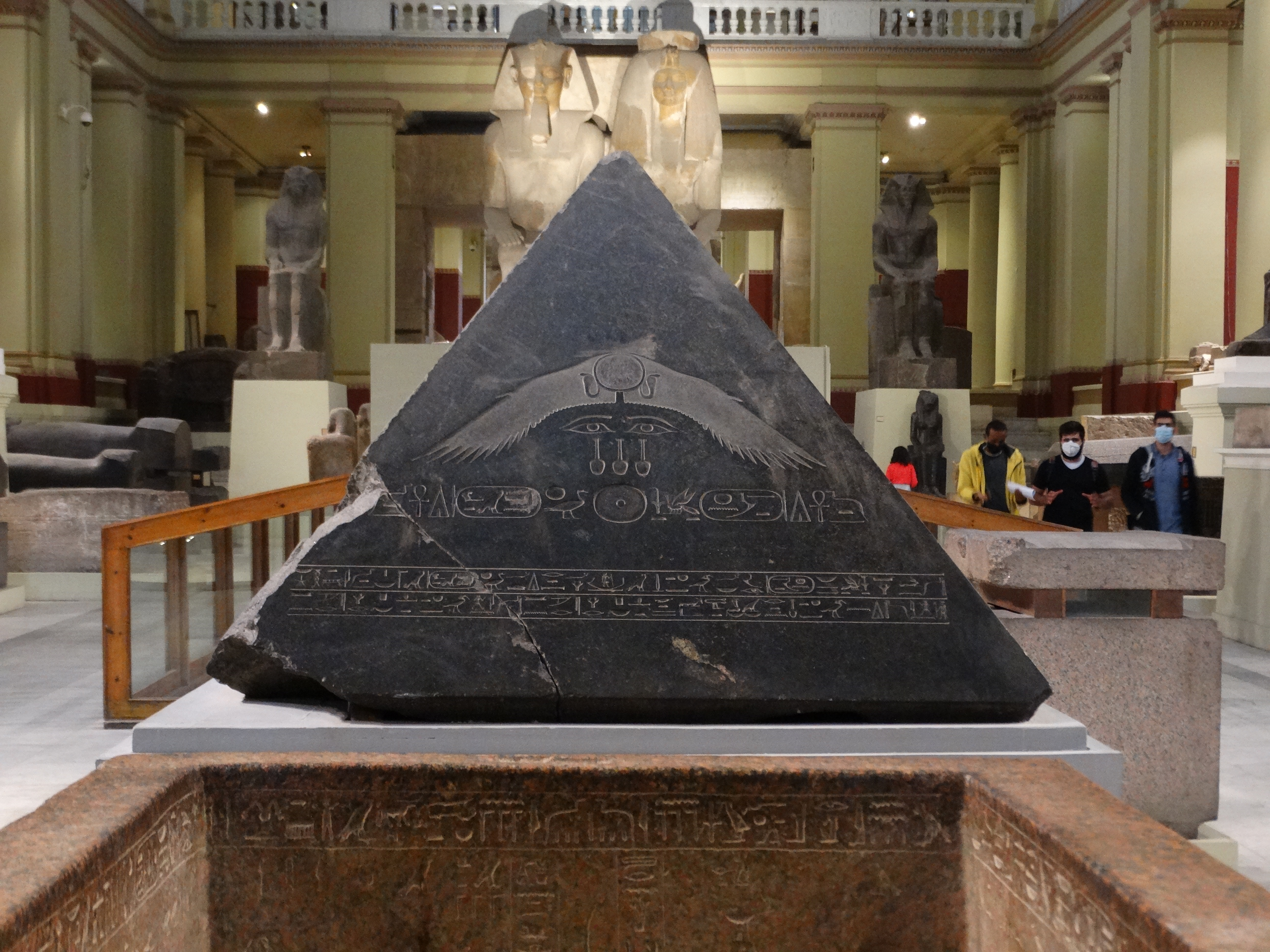
Pyramidion from the pyramid of Amenemhat III at Dashur

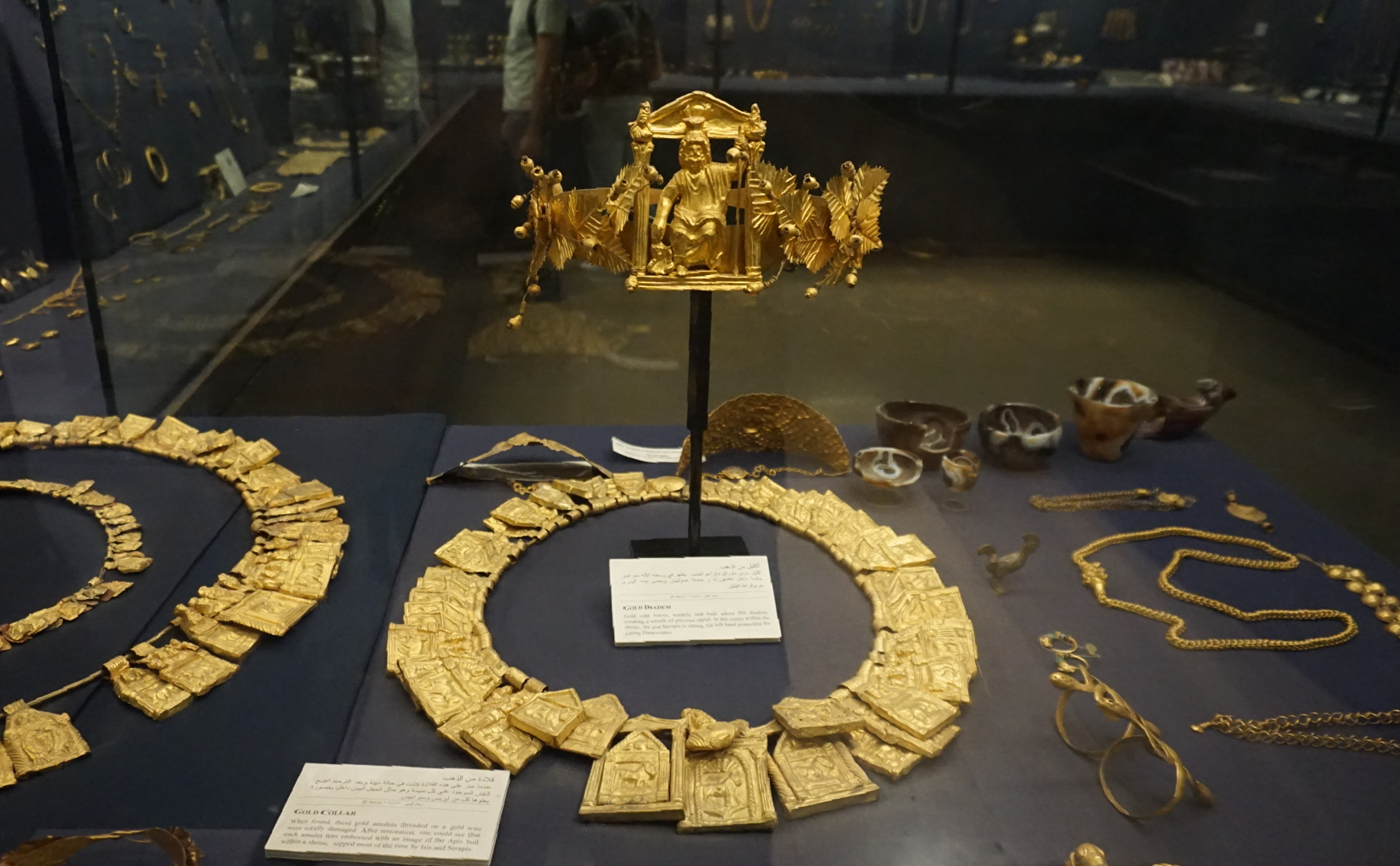
The Treasure of Dush from Dush, Egypt

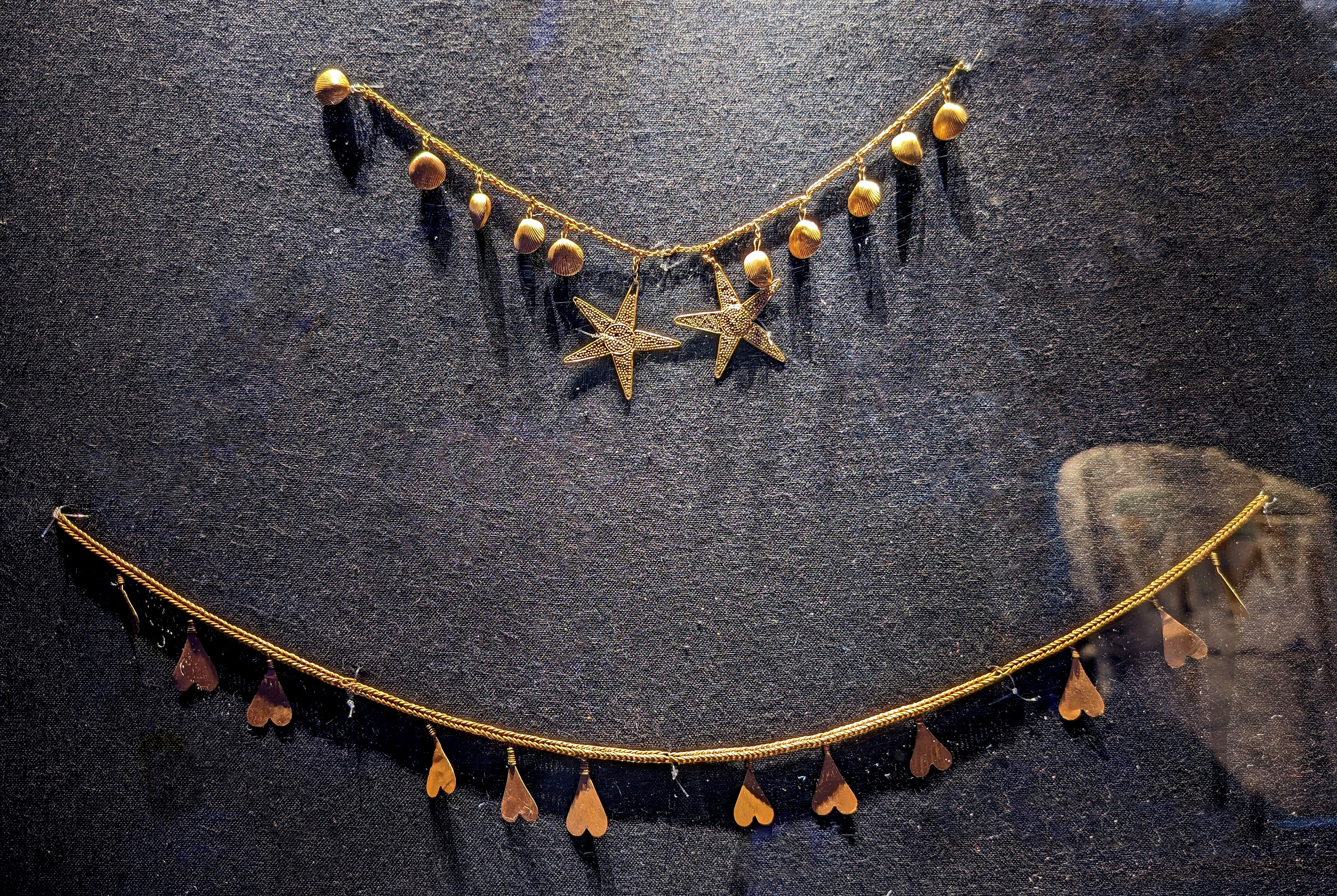
Princess Khenmet or Khnumit treasures

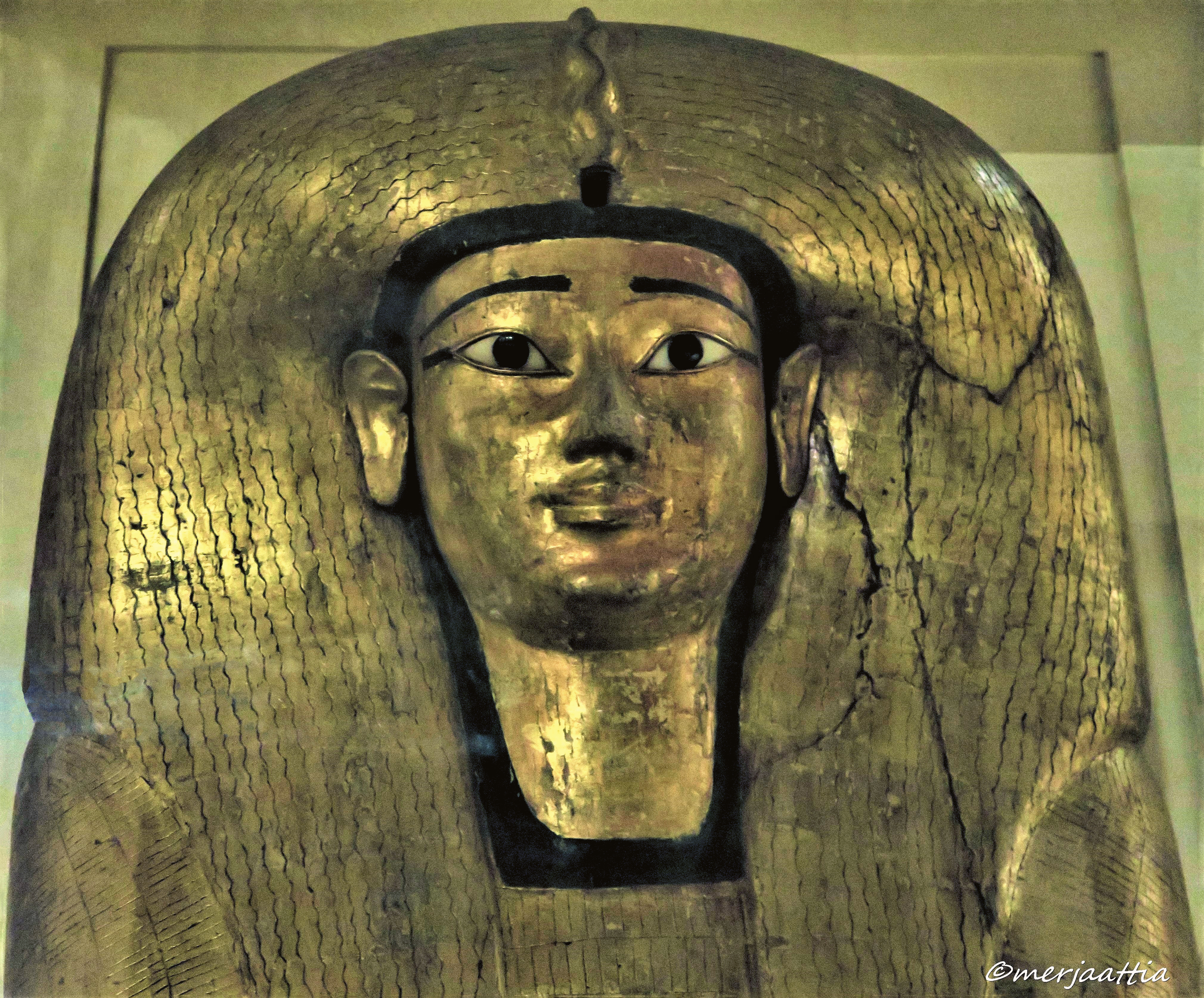
Queen Ahhotep II

=== Items formerly in the museum ===
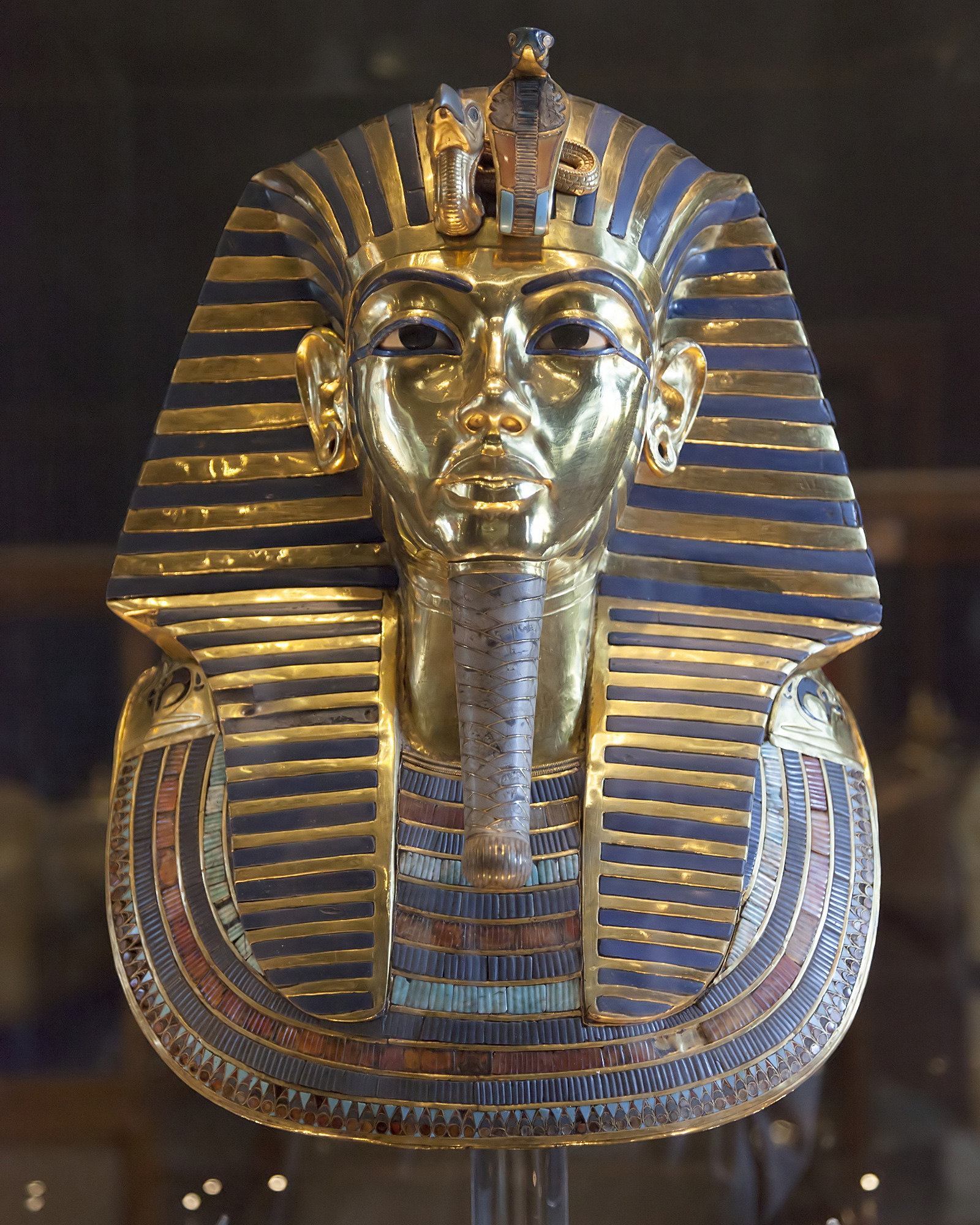
The Gold Mask of Tutankhamun, composed of 11 kg of solid gold; has since been relocated to the Grand Egyptian Museum

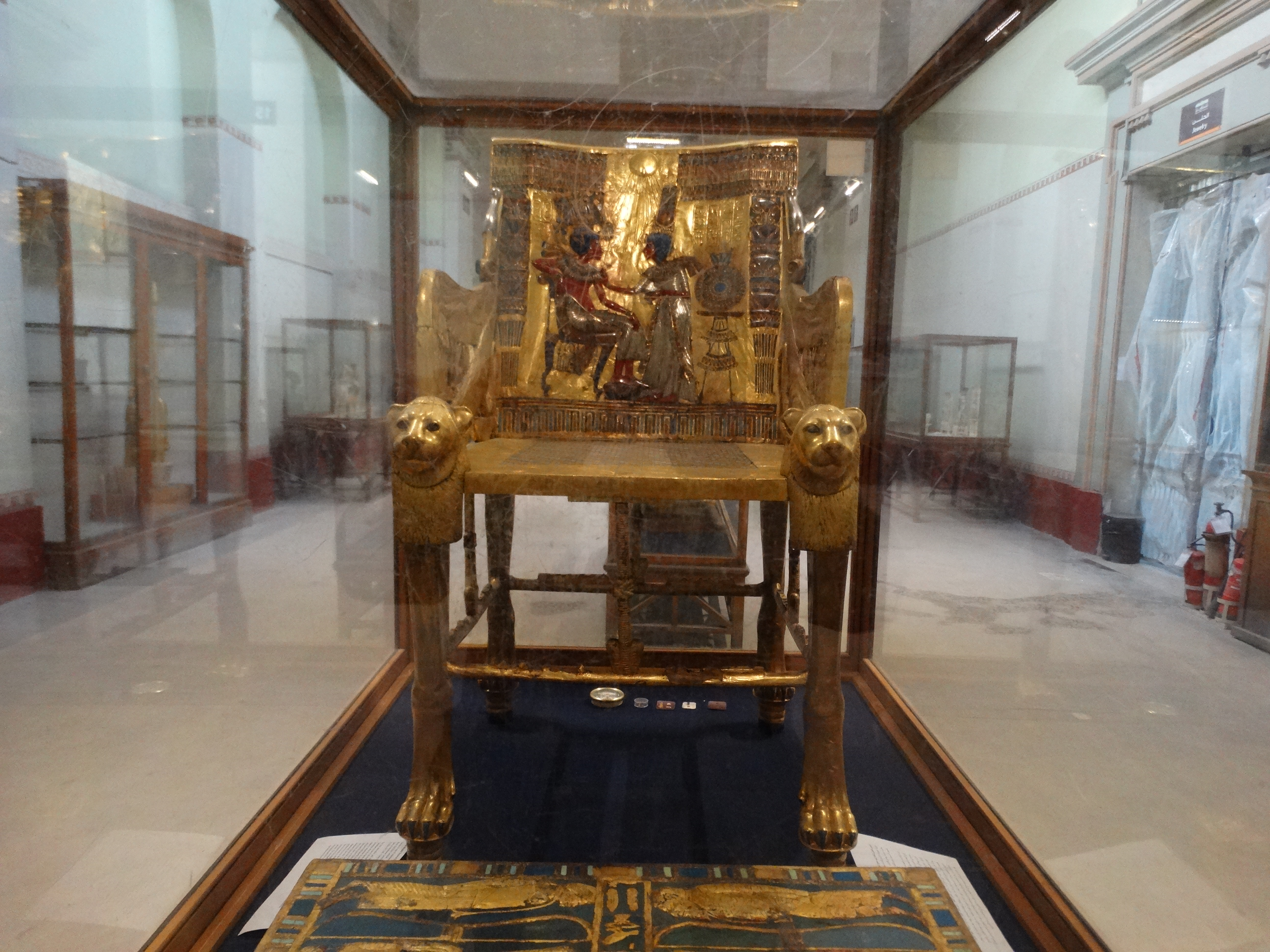
Throne of Tutankhamun; has since been relocated to the Grand Egyptian Museum

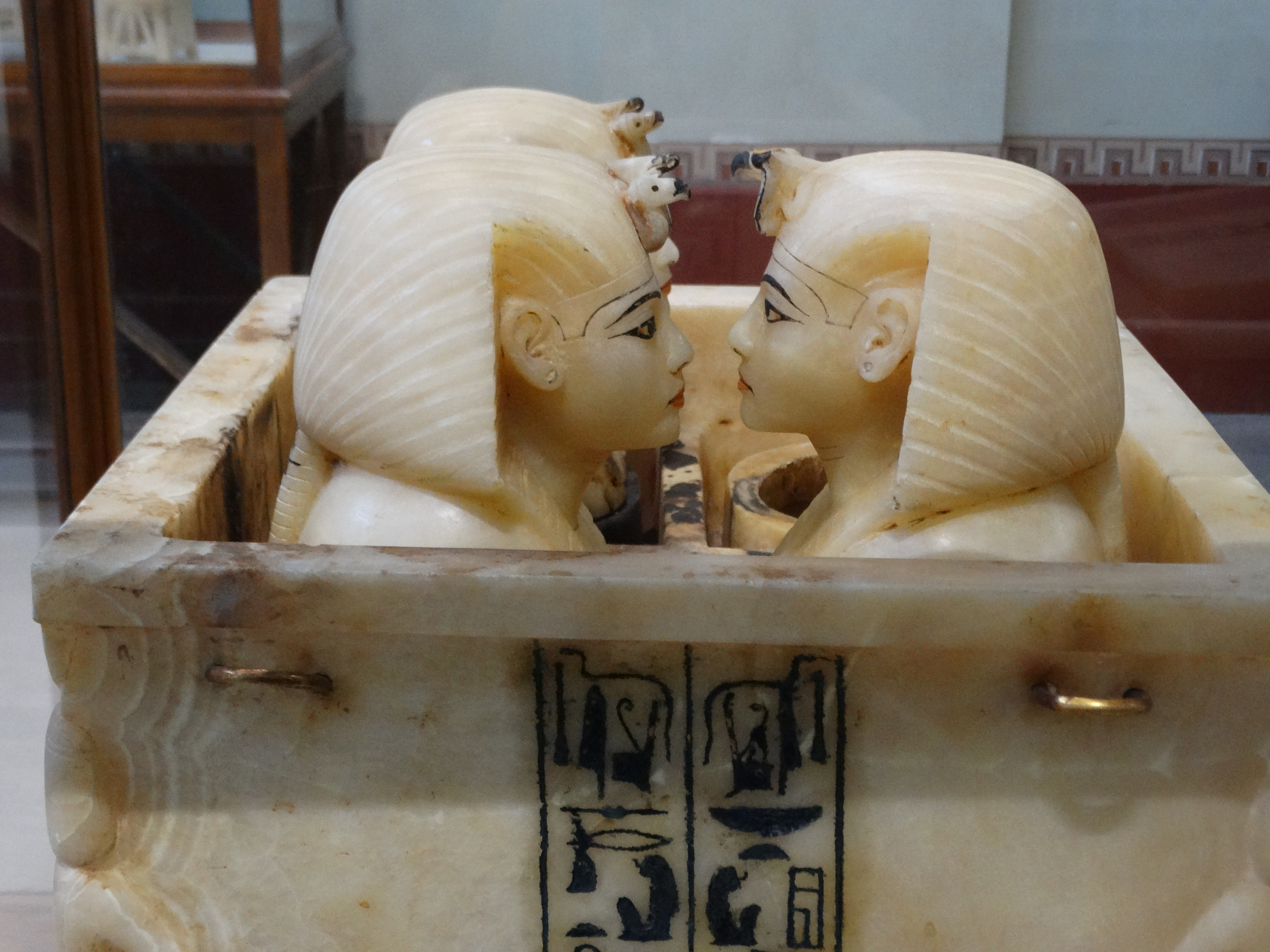
Canopic box from Tutankhamun's tomb; has since been relocated to the Grand Egyptian Museum

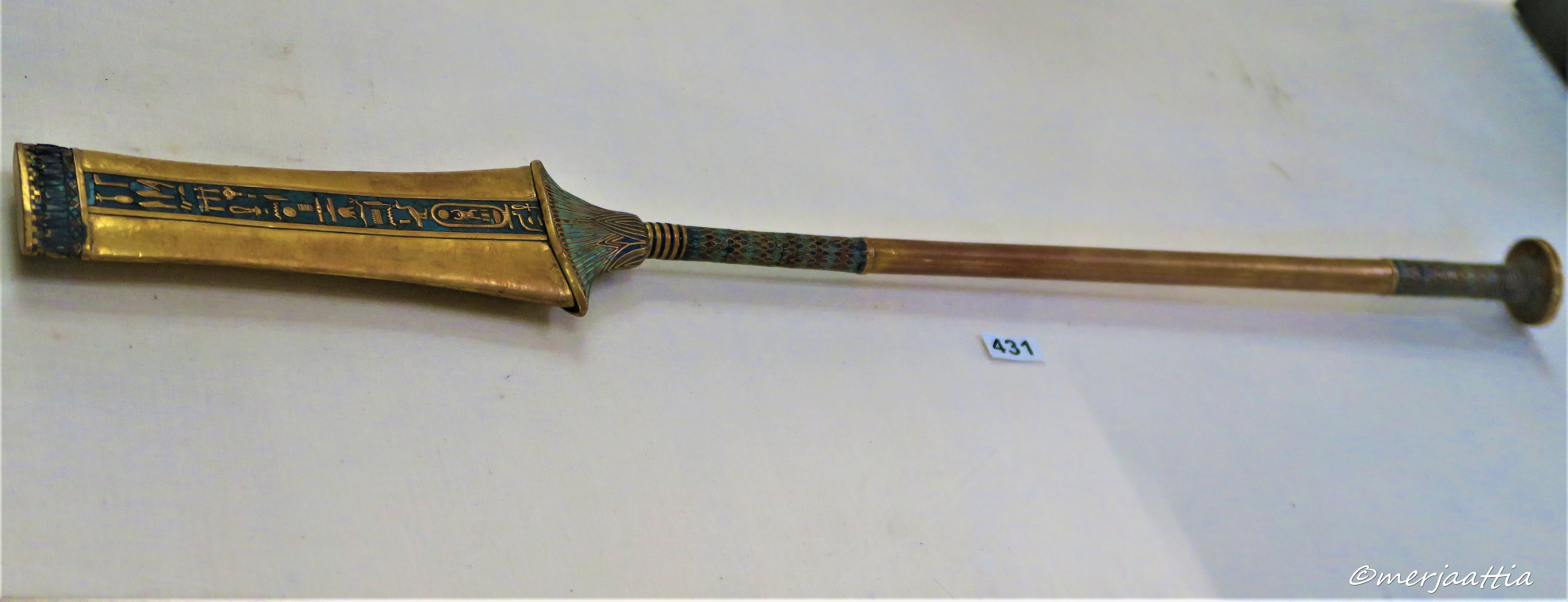
Tutankhamun's gilded woman sceptre; has since been relocated to the Grand Egyptian Museum

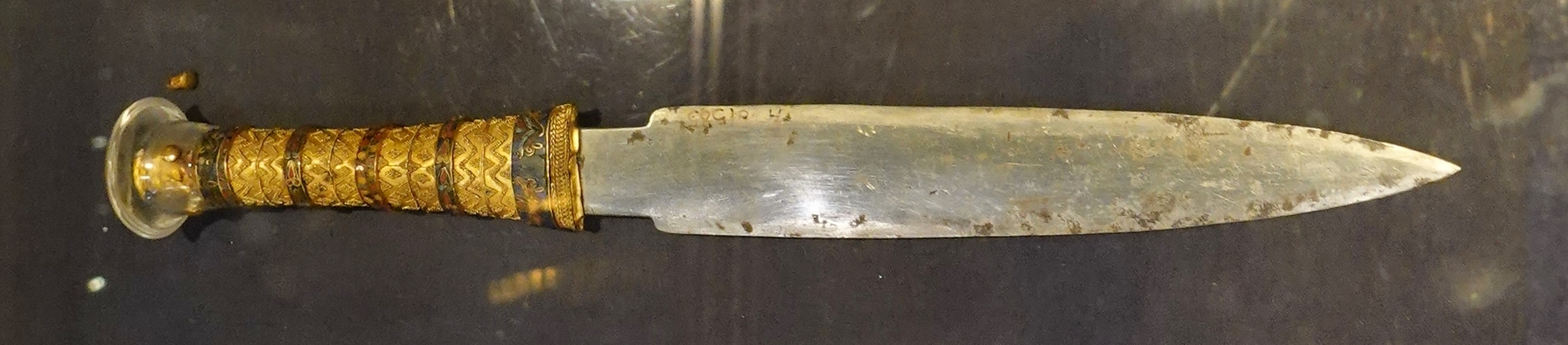
The iron dagger, found on Tutankhamun's body; has since been relocated to the Grand Egyptian Museum

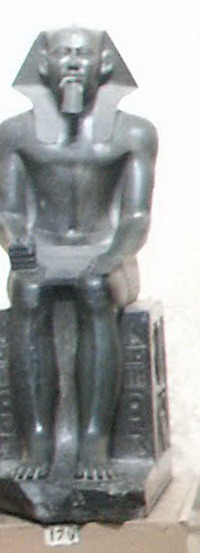
A statue of Khafre with the catalogue number CG 38; has since been relocated to the Grand Egyptian Museum

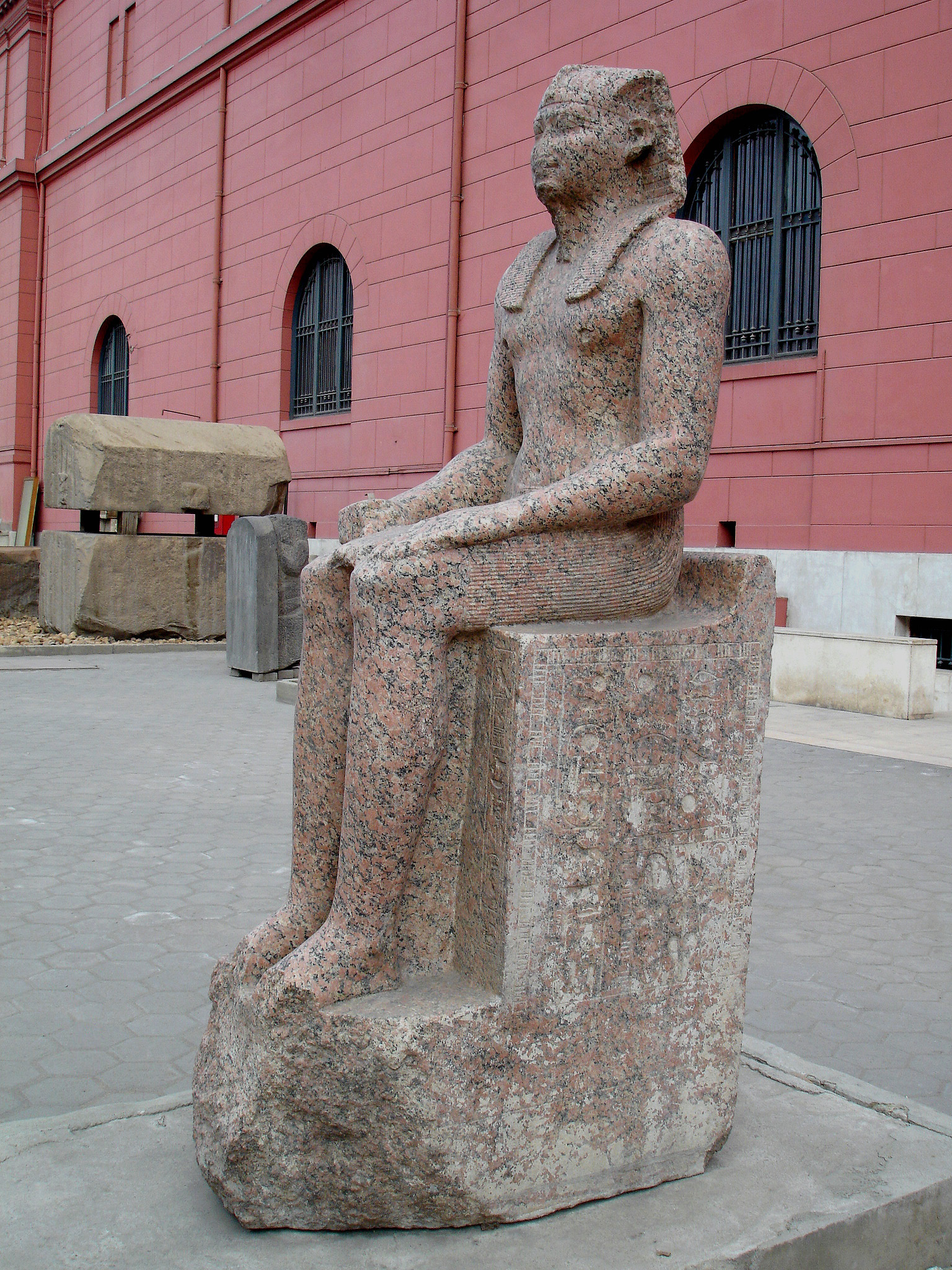
A statue of Amenemhat I in the museum garden; has since been relocated to the Grand Egyptian Museum

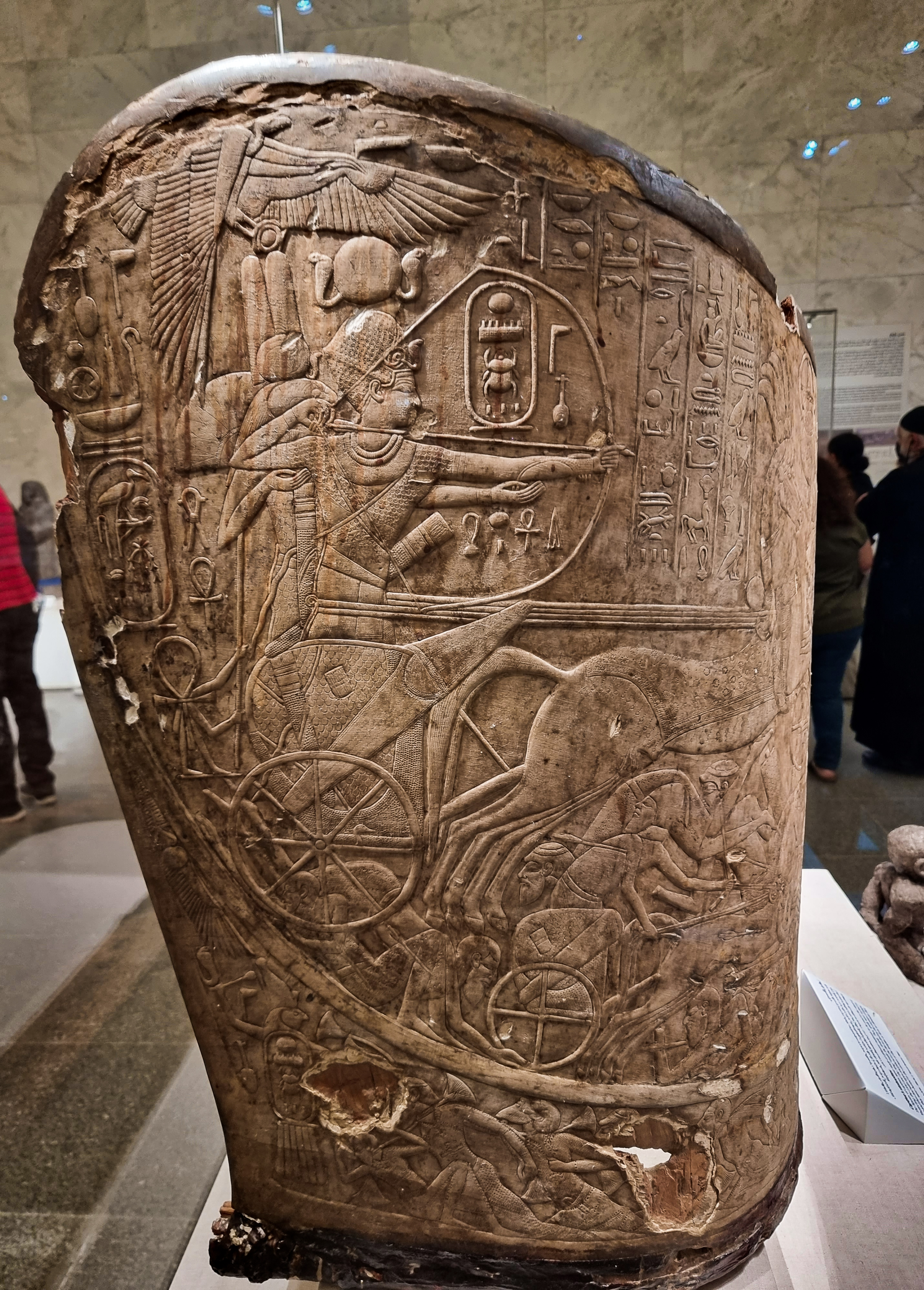
Chariot of king Thutmose IV; has since been relocated to the National Museum of Egyptian Civilization

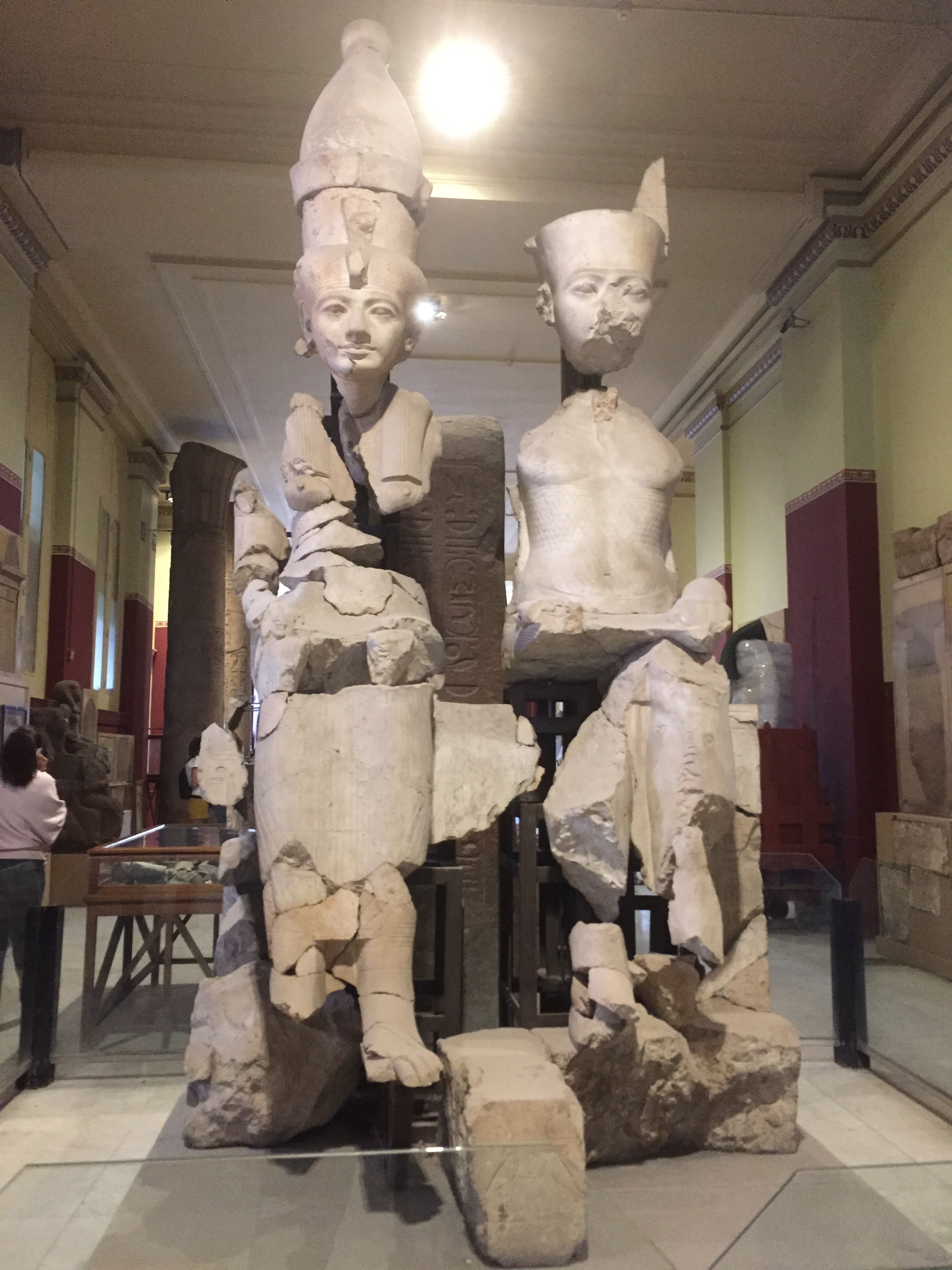
Monumental Dyad of Amun and Mut from Karnak, with features of Tutankhamun and Ankhesenamun; has since been relocated to the Grand Egyptian Museum

Restoration Stela of Tutankhamun; has since been relocated to the Grand Egyptian Museum

== See also ==
- List of museums in Egypt
- National Museum of Egyptian Civilization
- Grand Egyptian Museum
- List of largest art museums
- List of museums with major collections of Egyptian antiquities
