= TT196 =

Theban tomb

Coordinates: 25.7342°N 32.6117°E

Theban tomb TT196
- Burial site of Padihorresnet
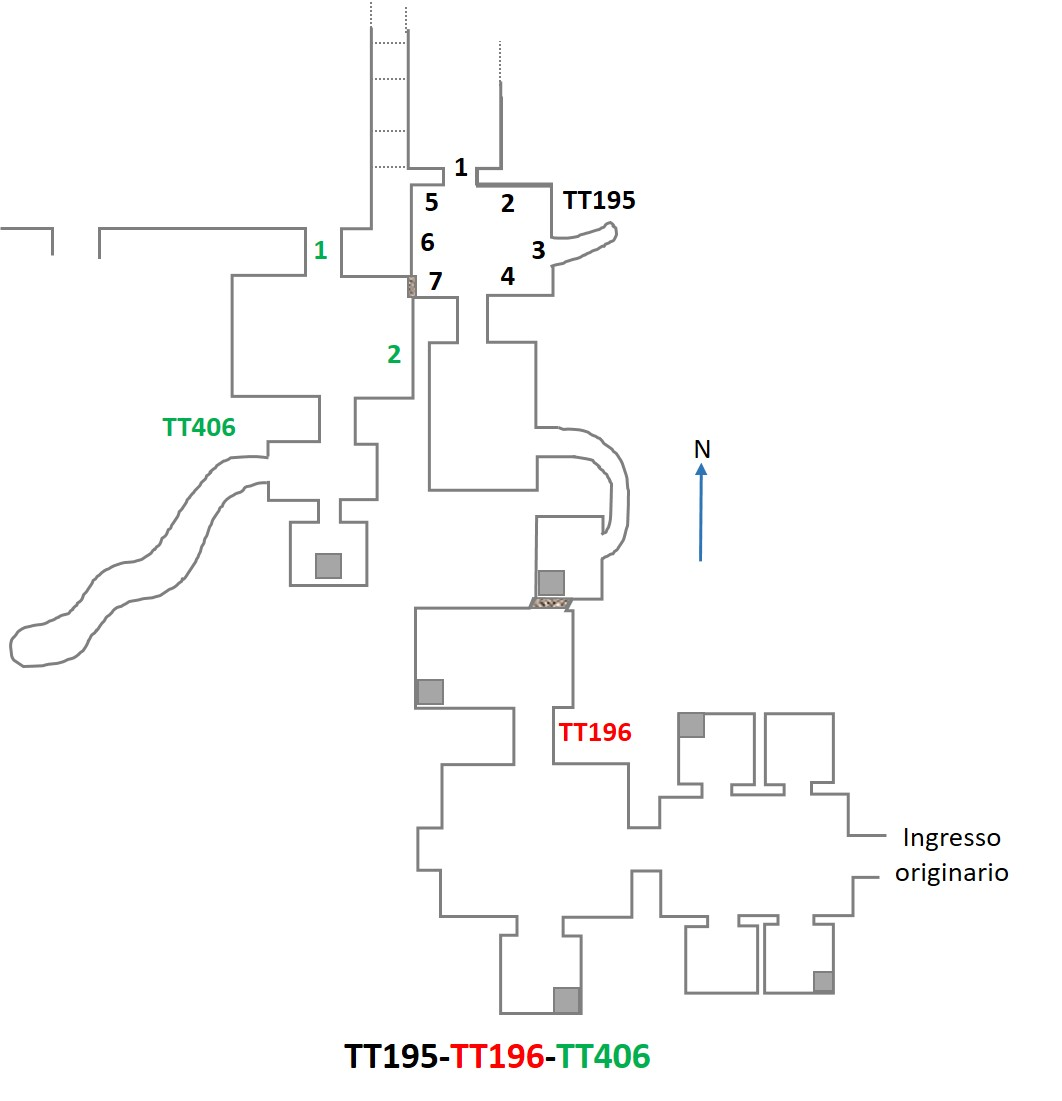

- Location within Egypt
- Location: El-Assasif, Theban Necropolis
- ← Previous; TT195 Next → TT197

G40 D37 G5 M24 n t
Padihorresnet
in hieroglyphs
Era: New Kingdom
(1550–1069 BC)

Tomb TT196, located in the necropolis of El-Assasif in Thebes, Egypt, is the tomb of Padihorresnet, who was a chief steward of Amun during the Twenty-sixth Dynasty of Egypt. Padihorresnet's tomb is part of the TT192 tomb complex.

Padihorresnet was the son of the chief steward Ibi (tomb TT36) and Shepenernute.

== See also ==
- List of Theban tombs
