= TT189 =

Theban tomb

Theban tomb TT189
- Burial site of Nakhtdjehuty
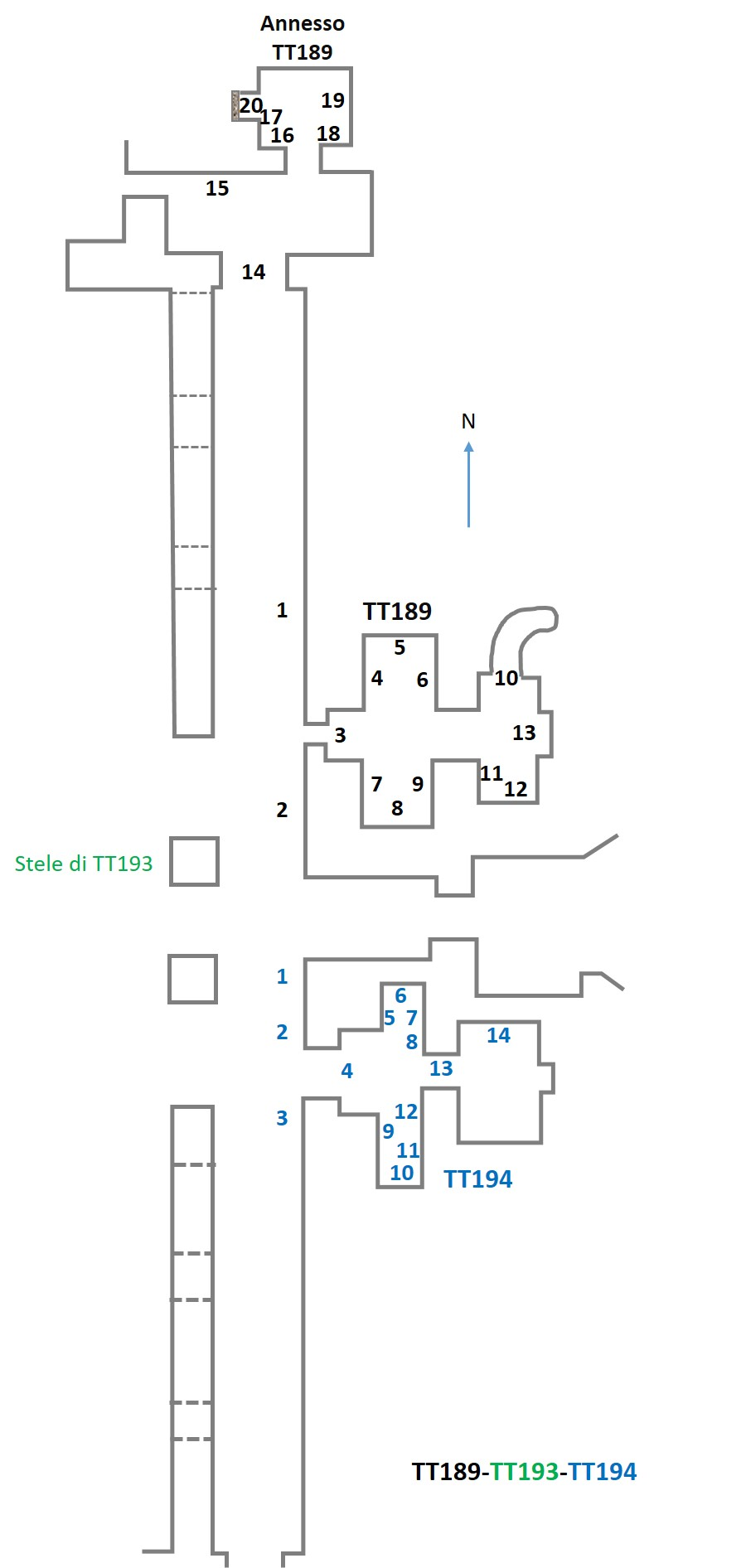

- Location within Egypt
- Location: El-Assasif, Theban Necropolis
- ← Previous; TT188 Next → TT190

n M3 Aa1 t D40 G26 t Z4
Nakhtdjehuty
in hieroglyphs
Era: New Kingdom
(1550–1069 BC)

Tomb TT189 is located in the necropolis of El-Assasif in Thebes, Egypt. It contains the sepulchre of Nakhtdjehuty (or Nakht-Thuty), who was an overseer of the carpenters of the northern lake of the god Amun and the head of the goldworkers in the Estate of Amun during the 19th Dynasty reign of Ramesses II. Nakhtdjehuty's tomb is part of the TT192 tomb complex.

== Family ==
Nakhtdjehuty had two wives. One was named Netemhab and only a partial name has survived for the other wife: Tentpa[...]. Kitchen gives her name as Tentpaopet.

Nakhtdjehuty had at least two sons. One was named Khensemhab, who was head of the goldworkers in the Estate of Amun like his father and Amenemwia who served as a priest of the goddess Mut of Asher.

== Tomb ==
The tomb entrance is located on the east wall of the court of the tomb of Kheruef (TT192). An annex was carved with its entrance in the north-east corner of the court of TT192. The main tomb consists of a facade, a hall, and an inner room.

The outer facade is decorated with depictions of divine barques on stands and temple doors of gold. The bottom register records 13 doorways with text above them. Some of the text is damaged, but partial texts remain. The doors include: a "Door of Gold of the Workshops of the Estate of Amun", "Doors of Gold of the Upper Open Court of Amun", etc. The second register depicts several doorways with names such as the "Double Portal of Gold of Mut". Another register shows several sacred barques, some accompanied by people.

The hall is decorated with scenes form the Book of Gates and scenes from a funerary procession. Son Khensemhab appears before Nakhtdjehuty and his wife Tentpaopet. The hall contains an autobiographical text which decorates the left-rear wall and the north wall. Nakhtdjehuty mentions that he was appointed as chief craftsman and chief of the goldsmiths due to his skill. The text is fragmentary but he talks about making great doors at Karnak. He lists several portable barques he worked on. He serviced the portable barque of Isis, Lady of Abydos, the portable barque of Khnum in Esna in year 55 of Ramesses II, the portable barque of Nebtu, the portable barque of Seth of Upper Egypt in year 58, and several more.

The inner room contains scenes of a banquet and scenes depicting Nekhtdjehuty kneeling before Osiris and Isis. Both sons, Khensemhab and Amenemwia, are depicted in the inner room offering to their parents.

== The annex ==
The annex consists of a hall and an inner room. In the hall Nakhtdjehuty and his wife Netemhab are shown before re-Harakhti, Maat, and Osiris and Isis. The inner room contains scenes of a man purifying the couple and offering for instance bouquets to them. Some scenes from the Book of Gates appear on the east wall.

== See also ==
- List of Theban tombs
