= TT190 =

Theban tomb

Theban tomb TT190
- Burial site of Esbanebded
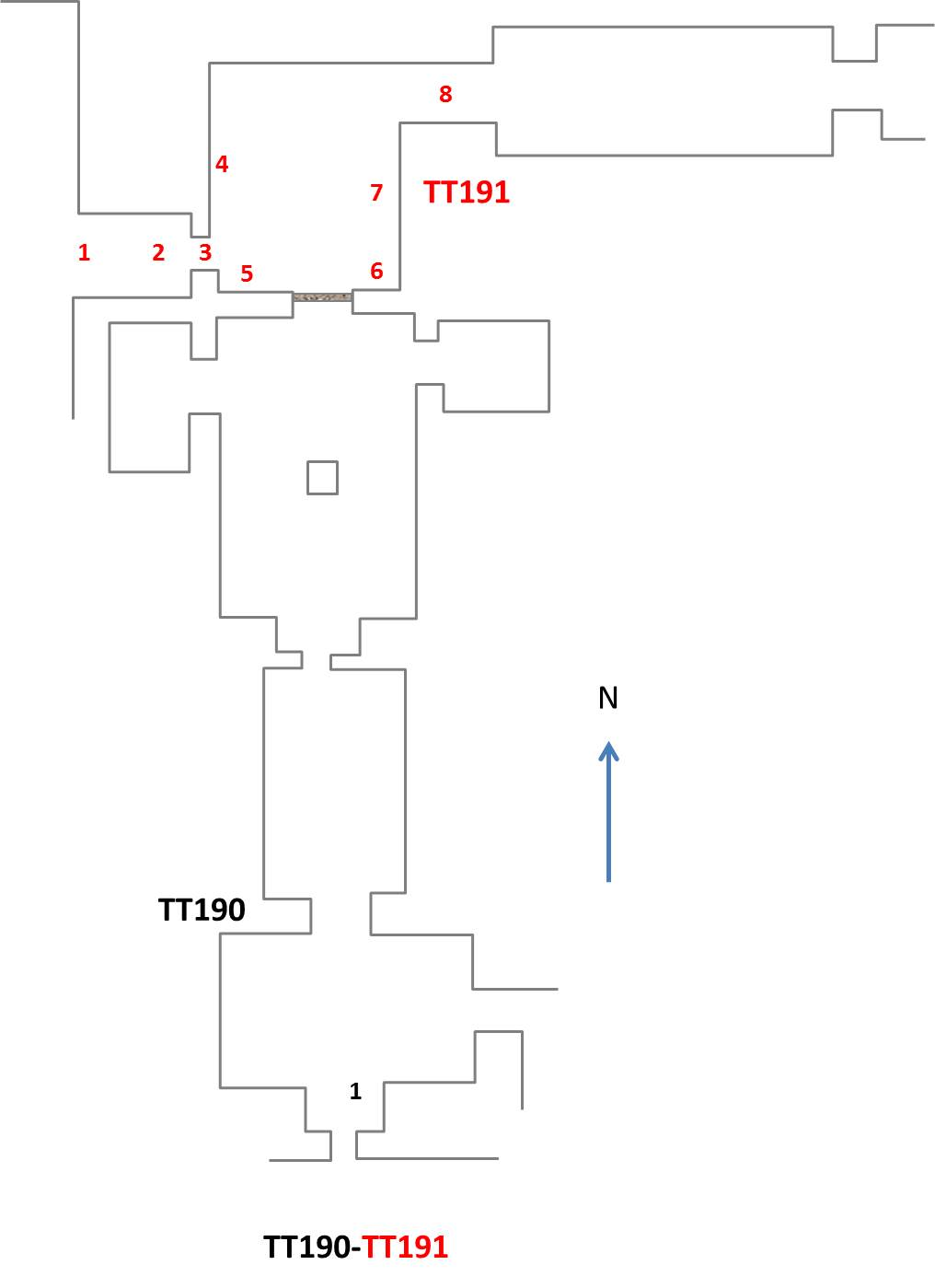

- Location within Egypt
- Location: El-Assasif, Theban Necropolis
- ← Previous; TT189 Next → TT191

F20 O34 R7 E10 nb R11 R11
Esbanebded
in hieroglyphs
Era: New Kingdom
(1550–1069 BC)

Tomb TT190, located in the necropolis of El-Assasif in Thebes, Egypt, is the tomb of Esbanebded and part of the TT192 tomb complex.

Esbanebded was a divine father and prophet at the head of the king dating to the Twenty-sixth Dynasty of Egypt. His parents are Pakharkhons (a divine father) and Meramuniotes (Sistrumplayer of Amen-Re). He had a son who was named Pakharkhons after his grandfather.
