= TT195 =

Theban tomb

Theban tomb TT195
- Burial site of Bekenamun
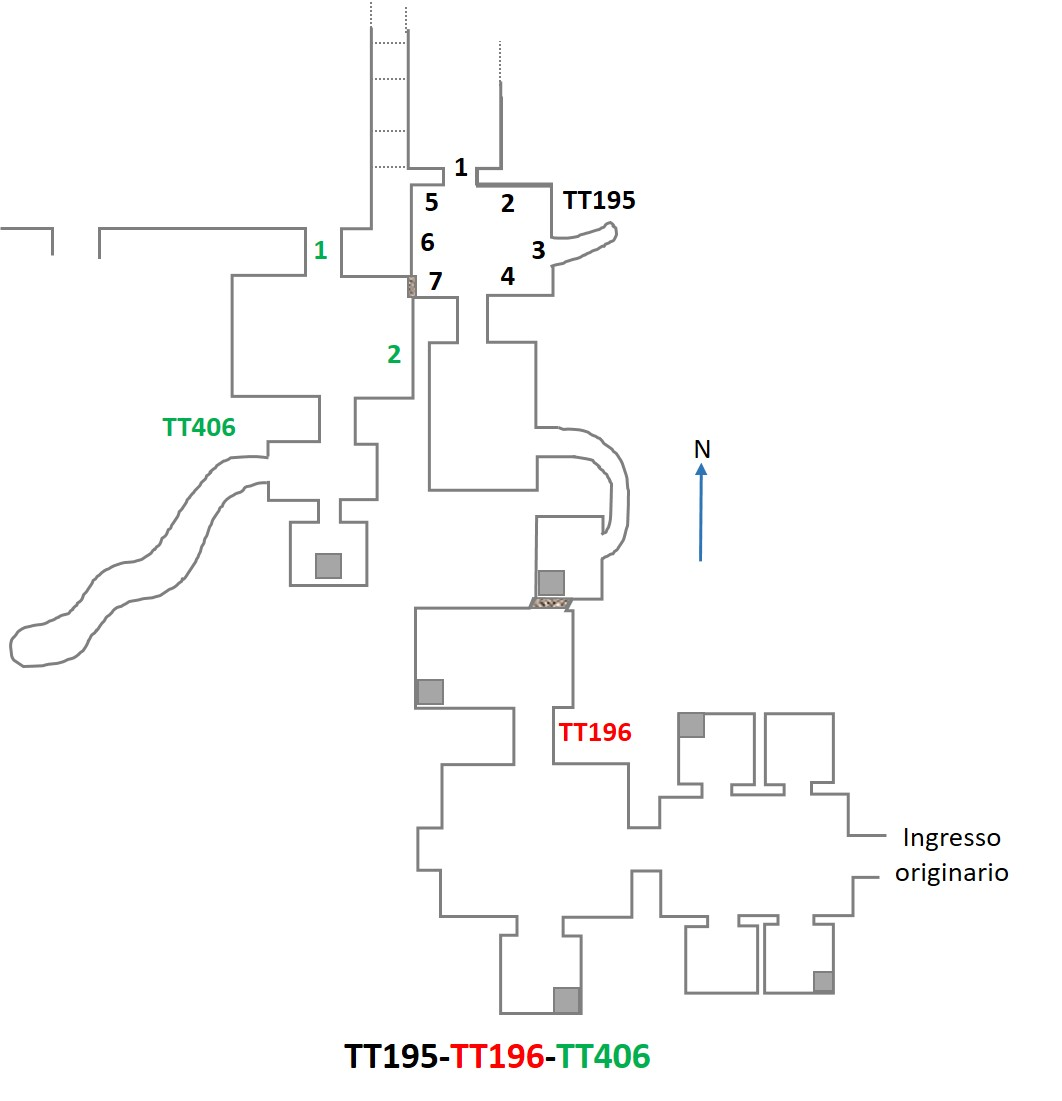

- Location within Egypt
- Location: El-Assasif, Theban Necropolis
- ← Previous; TT194 Next → TT196

G29 k n i mn n
Bekenamun
in hieroglyphs
Era: New Kingdom
(1550–1069 BC)

Tomb TT195, located in the necropolis of El-Assasif in Thebes, Egypt, is the tomb of Bekenamun, who was a scribe in the treasury of the Estate of Amun during the Nineteenth Dynasty of Egypt. Bekenamun's tomb is part of the TT192 tomb complex.

Bekenamun had a wife named Weretnefert.

== See also ==
- List of Theban tombs
