= TT194 =

Theban tomb

Theban tomb TT194
- Burial site of Thutemhab
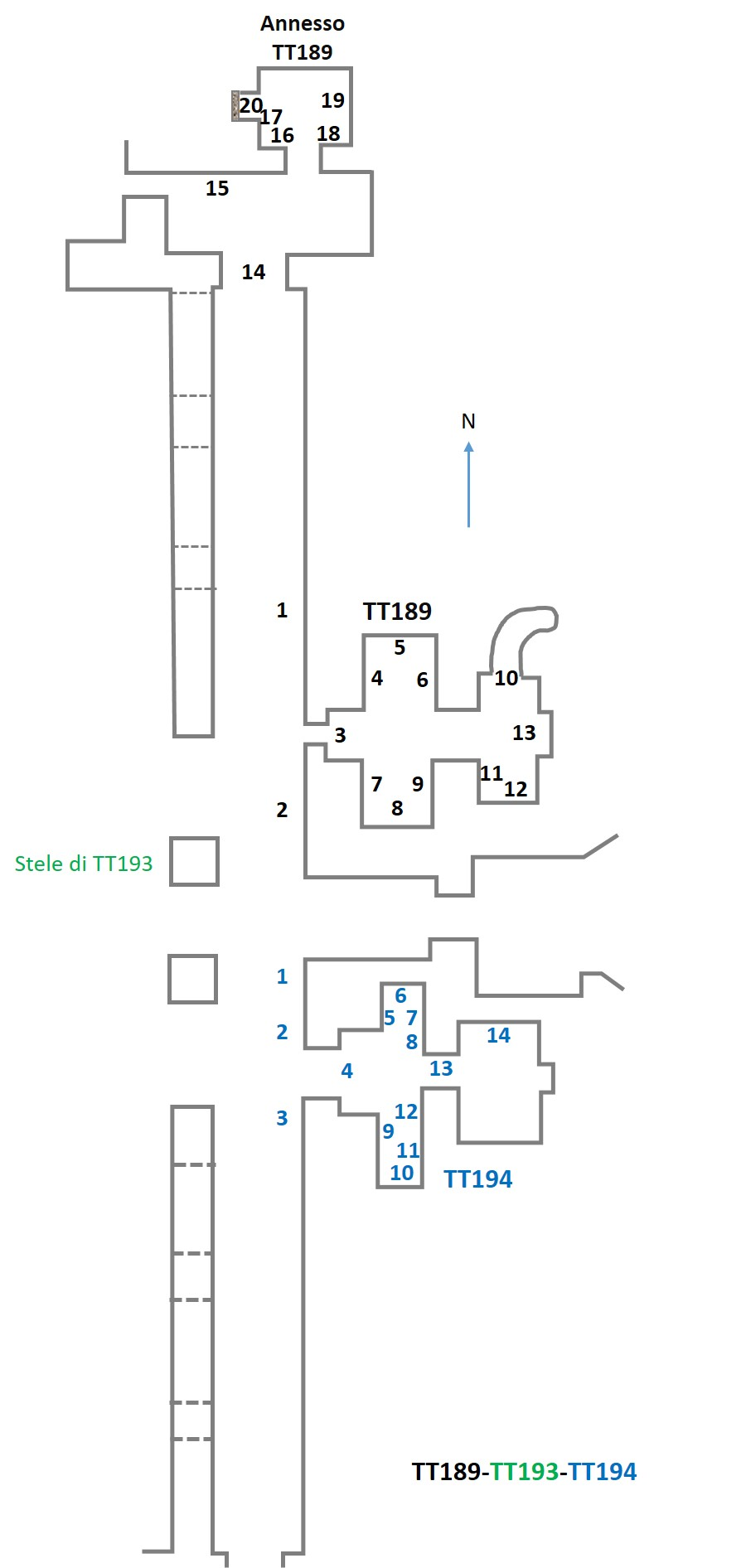

- Location within Egypt
- Location: El-Assasif, Theban Necropolis
- ← Previous; TT193 Next → TT195

G26 t Z4 Aa13 W3
Thutemhab
in hieroglyphs
Era: New Kingdom
(1550–1069 BC)

Tomb TT194, located in the necropolis of El-Assasif in Thebes, Egypt, is the tomb of Thutemhab (Djehutyemhab), who was an overseer of the marshland-dwellers of the Estate of Amun and a scribe in the temple of Amun during the Nineteenth Dynasty of Egypt. Thutemhab's tomb is part of the TT192 tomb complex.

Thutemhab had a wife named Nedjemetmut. Two brothers named Amenemopet and Amenhotep respectively are mentioned in the tomb.

== See also ==
- List of Theban tombs
