= TT191 =

Theban tomb

Theban tomb TT191
- Burial site of Wahibre-Nebpehti
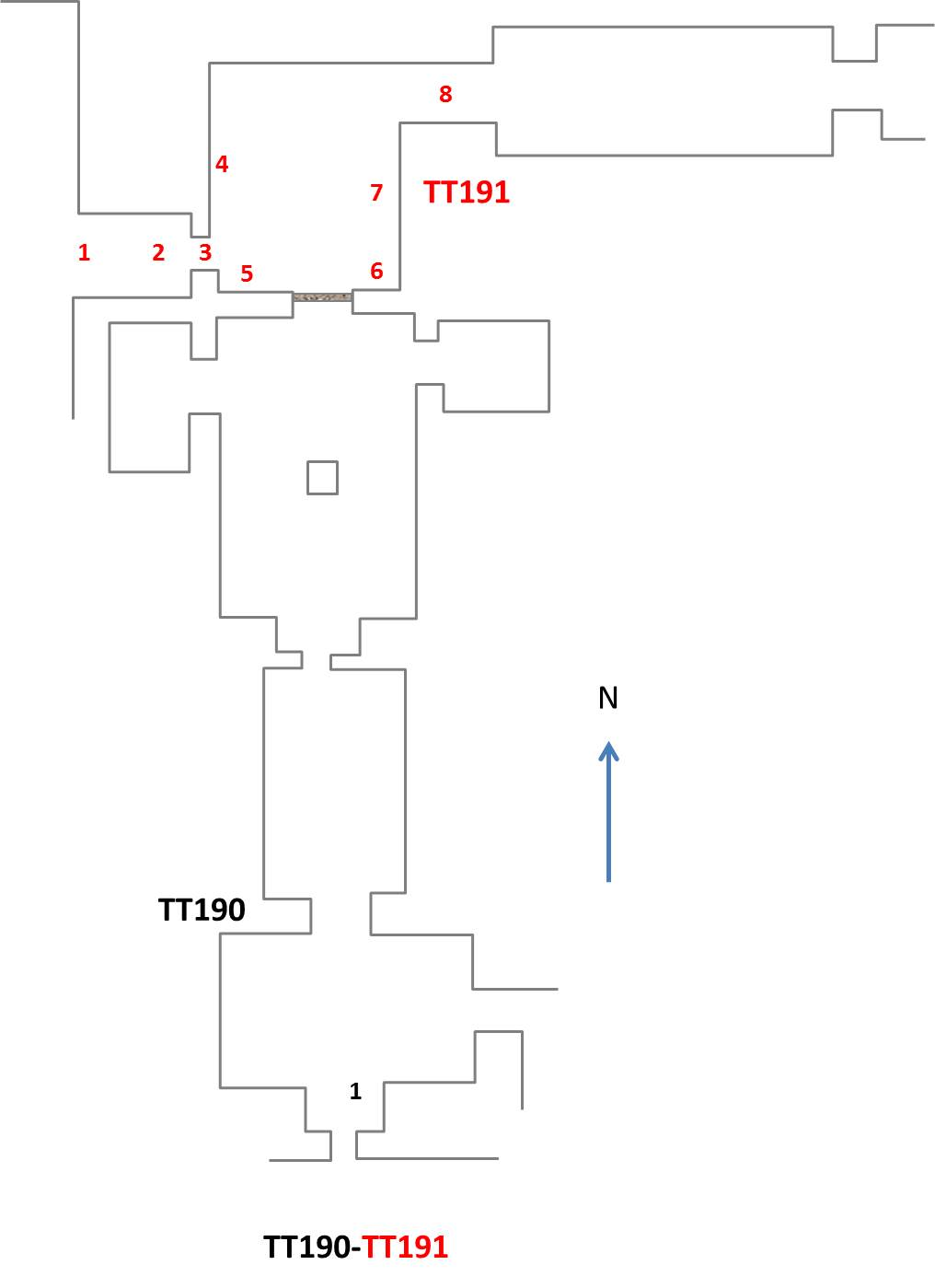

- Location within Egypt
- Location: El-Assasif, Theban Necropolis
- ← Previous; TT190 Next → TT192

N5 V29 ib nb F9 D40
Wahibre-Nebpehti
in hieroglyphs
Era: New Kingdom
(1550–1069 BC)

Tomb TT191, located in the necropolis of El-Assasif in Thebes, Egypt, is the tomb of Wahibre-Nebpehti, who was the chamberlain of the Divine Adoratrice of Amun and the director of the festival from the time of Psamtik I.

Wahibre-Nebpehti's tomb is part of the TT192 tomb complex. Wahibre-nebpehti was the son of Pedehor (a head of the outline draughtsmen) and Thesmutpert. Wahibre-nebpehti had a son who was named Pedehor after his grandfather. The son was also a chamberlain of the Divine Adoratrice.

== See also ==
- List of Theban tombs
