= TT193 =

Theban tomb

Theban tomb TT193
- Burial site of Ptahemheb
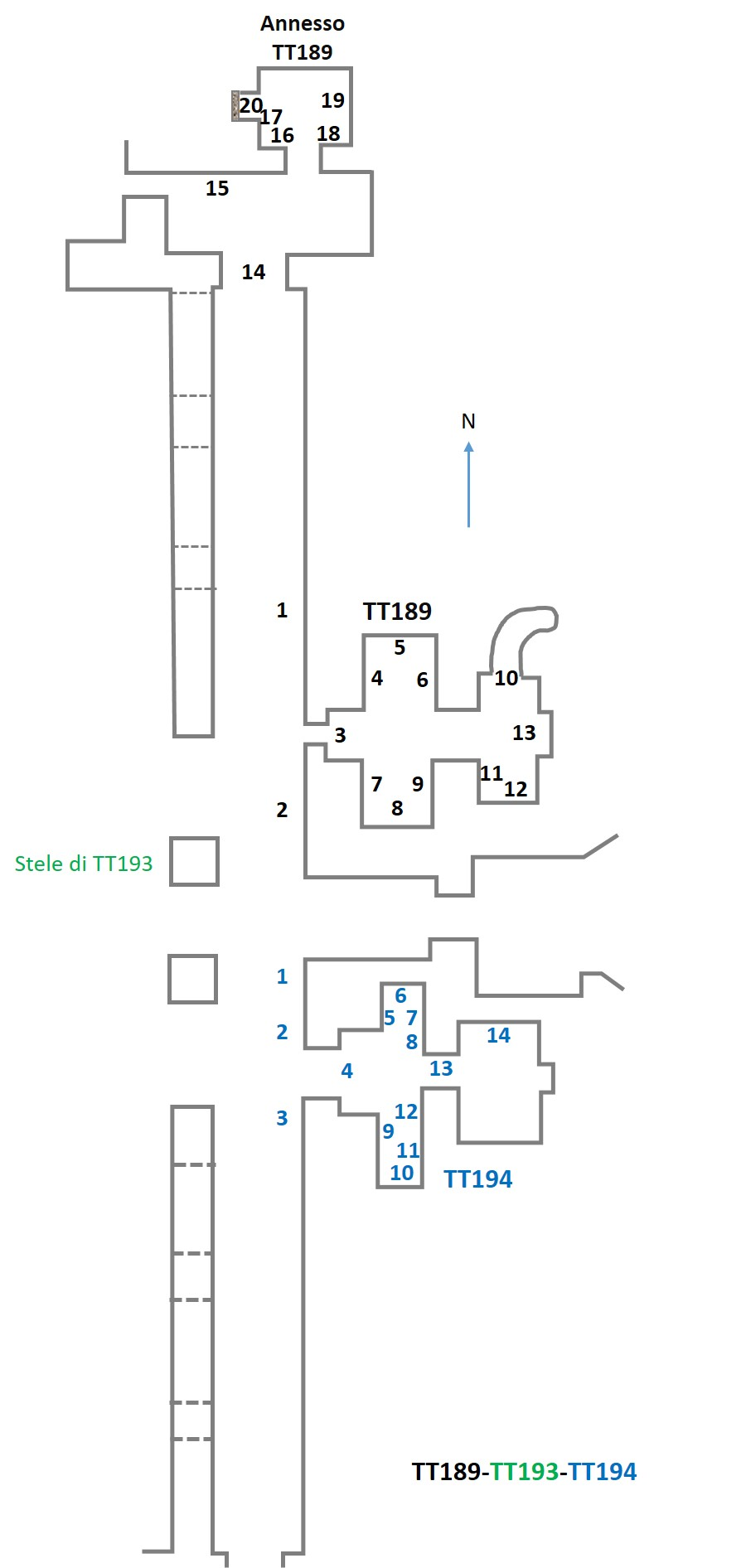

- Location within Egypt
- Location: El-Assasif, Theban Necropolis
- ← Previous; TT192 Next → TT194

p t H Aa13 H b W3 N5
Ptahemheb
in hieroglyphs
Era: New Kingdom
(1550–1069 BC)

Tomb TT193, located in the necropolis of El-Assasif in Thebes, Egypt, is the tomb of Ptahemheb, who was a magnate of the seal in the treasury of the Estate of Amun during the Nineteenth Dynasty of Egypt. Ptahemheb's tomb is part of the TT192 tomb complex. A stele from the tomb is located in the courtyard of the tomb of Kheruef (TT192)

Ptahemhab had a wife named Tadewert.

== See also ==
- List of Theban tombs
