= TT407 =

Theban tomb

Theban tomb TT407
- Burial site of Bintenduanetjer
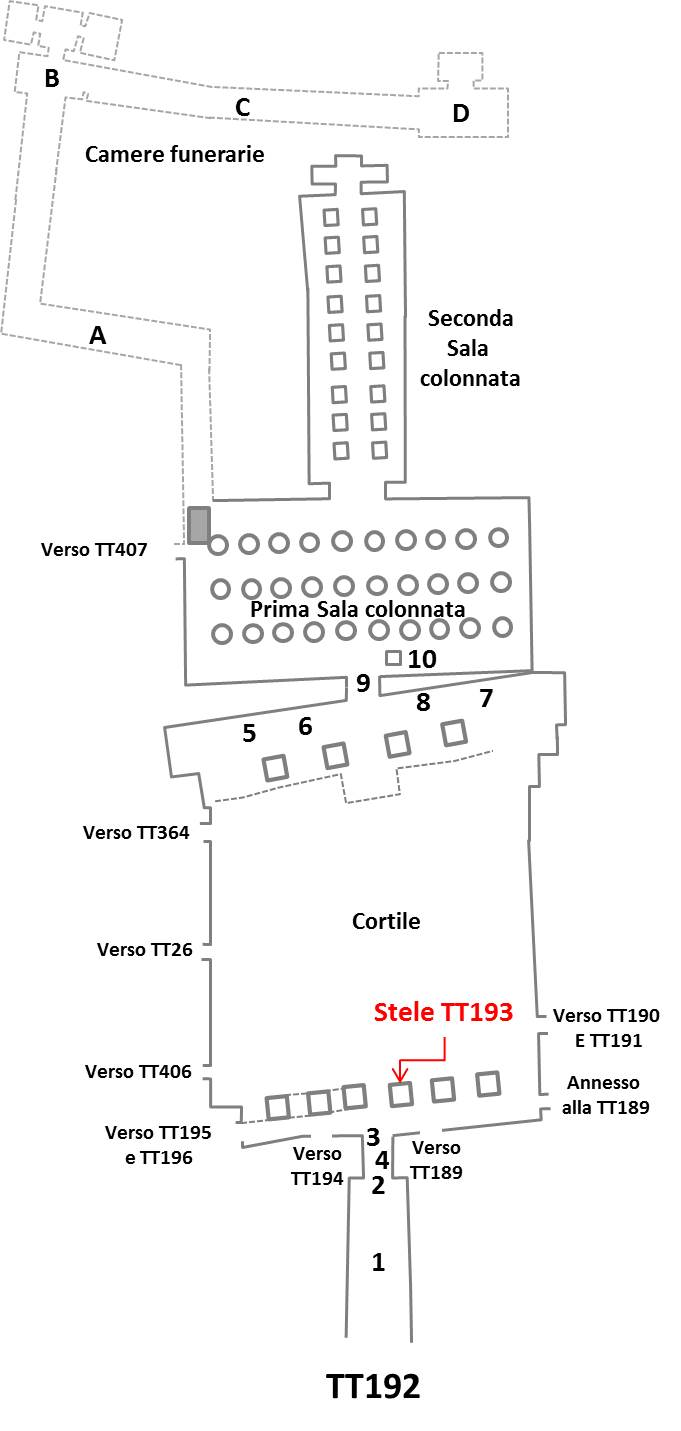
- TT 407 is located within the tomb of Kheruef TT192

- Location within Egypt
- Location: El-Assasif, Theban Necropolis
- ← Previous; TT406 Next → TT408

b i n t Z4 n R8 N14 t
Bintenduanetjer
in hieroglyphs
Era: New Kingdom
(1550–1069 BC)

Tomb TT407, located in the necropolis of El-Assasif in Thebes, Egypt, is the tomb of Bintenduanetjer, who was the Chamberlain of the Divine Adoratrice, and dates to the Saite period.

The tomb is located off the south side of the first columned hall of Kheruef's tomb (TT192), which dates to the Eighteenth Dynasty of Egypt.

== See also ==
- List of Theban tombs
