= TT406 =

Theban tomb

Theban tomb TT406
- Burial site of Piay
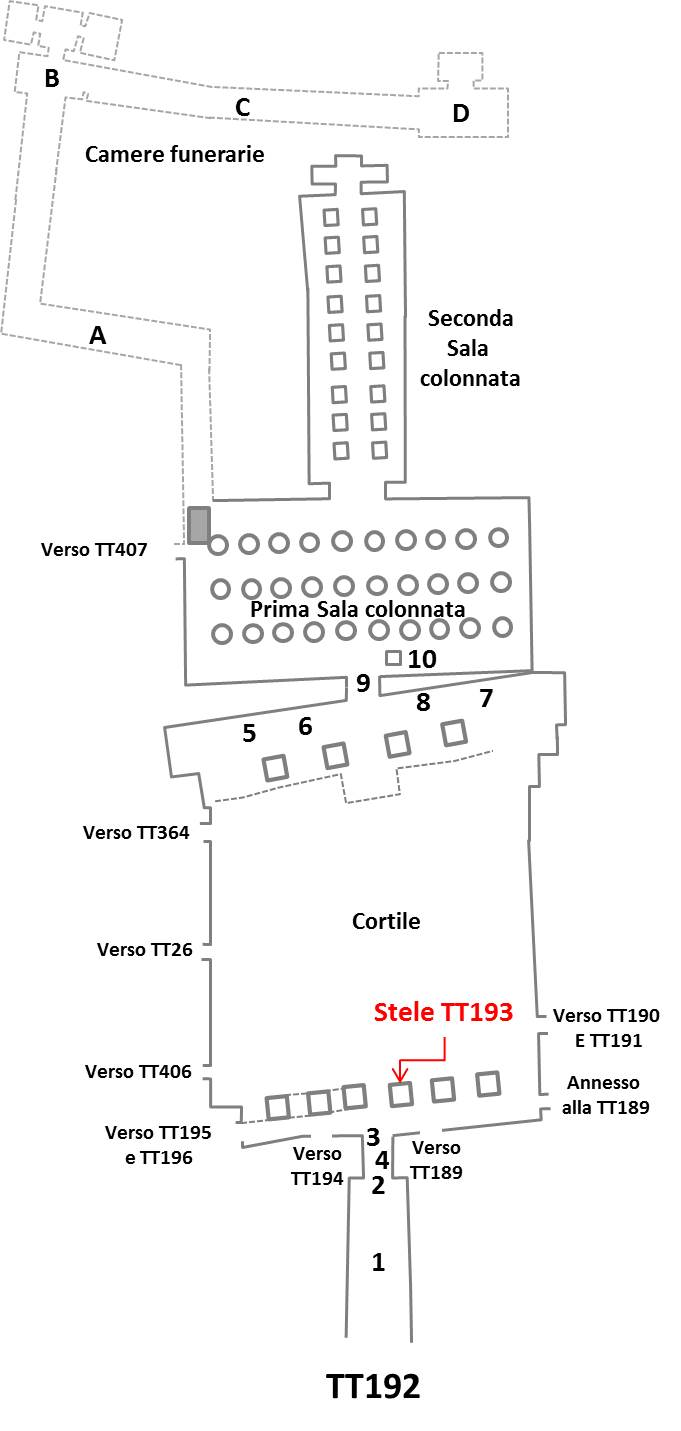

- Location within Egypt
- Location: El-Assasif, Theban Necropolis
- ← Previous; TT405 Next → TT407

p Z4 i G1 i i
Piay
in hieroglyphs
Era: New Kingdom
(1550–1069 BC)

Tomb TT406, located in the necropolis of El-Assasif in Thebes, Egypt, is the tomb of Piay, a scribe of the offering table of the Lord of the Two Lands dated to the Ramesside period. It is located in El-Assasif, part of the Theban Necropolis.

== Tomb ==
TT406 has its entrance located on the south wall of the courtyard of TT192, the tomb of Kheruef. The tomb has an unfinished hall. Scenes in the tomb include the barque of Ra being dragged by jackals, the tomb owner and his wife before Amun, Maat, and the Western Goddess, the deceased with a hymn to Osiris, and images of the funerary procession with priests before the mummies at the tomb.

== See also ==
- List of Theban tombs
