= TT36 =

Theban tomb

Coordinates: 25.7333°N 32.6000°E

Theban tomb TT36
- Burial site of Ibi
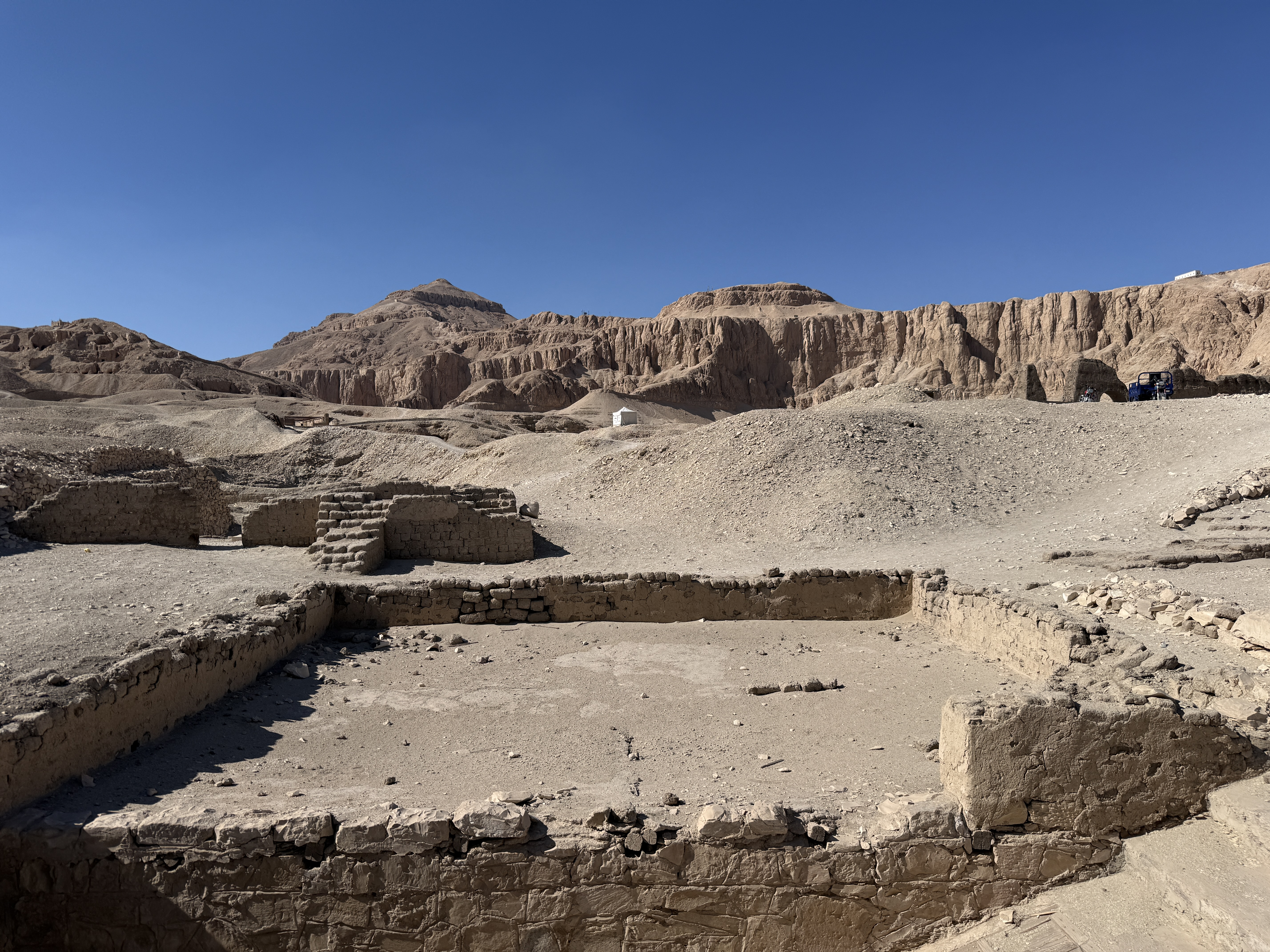
- Exterior view of TT36 at El-Assasif

- Location within Egypt
- Location: El-Assasif, Theban Necropolis
- Discovered: 26th Dynasty
- ← Previous; TT35 Next → TT37

i b i
Ibi
in hieroglyphs
Era: Late Period
(664–332 BC)

The Theban tomb TT36, also known as the Tomb of Ibi, is located in El-Assasif, part of the Theban Necropolis, on the west bank of the Nile opposite Luxor. It was the burial place of the ancient Egyptian official Ibi, chief steward of Nitocris I, the Divine Adoratrice of Amun, during the reign of Psamtik I in the 26th Dynasty.

== Ibi and his family ==
Ibi was the son of Ankh-hor, a divine father, and De-Ubasteiri, also called Teiri; his wife was Shepenernute, and their sons included Padihorresnet (also called Padihor), who became chief steward of Amun, Pedepeneferenirtef, and another son whose name is only partly preserved, ending in -monthu.

As chief steward of Nitocris I, daughter of Psamtik I and the highest religious authority in Thebes, Ibi administered her estate. The quality of his sarcophagus lid, finely carved in hard greywacke, reflects the high status of its owner.

The lid of Ibi's sarcophagus in the Museo Egizio, Turin

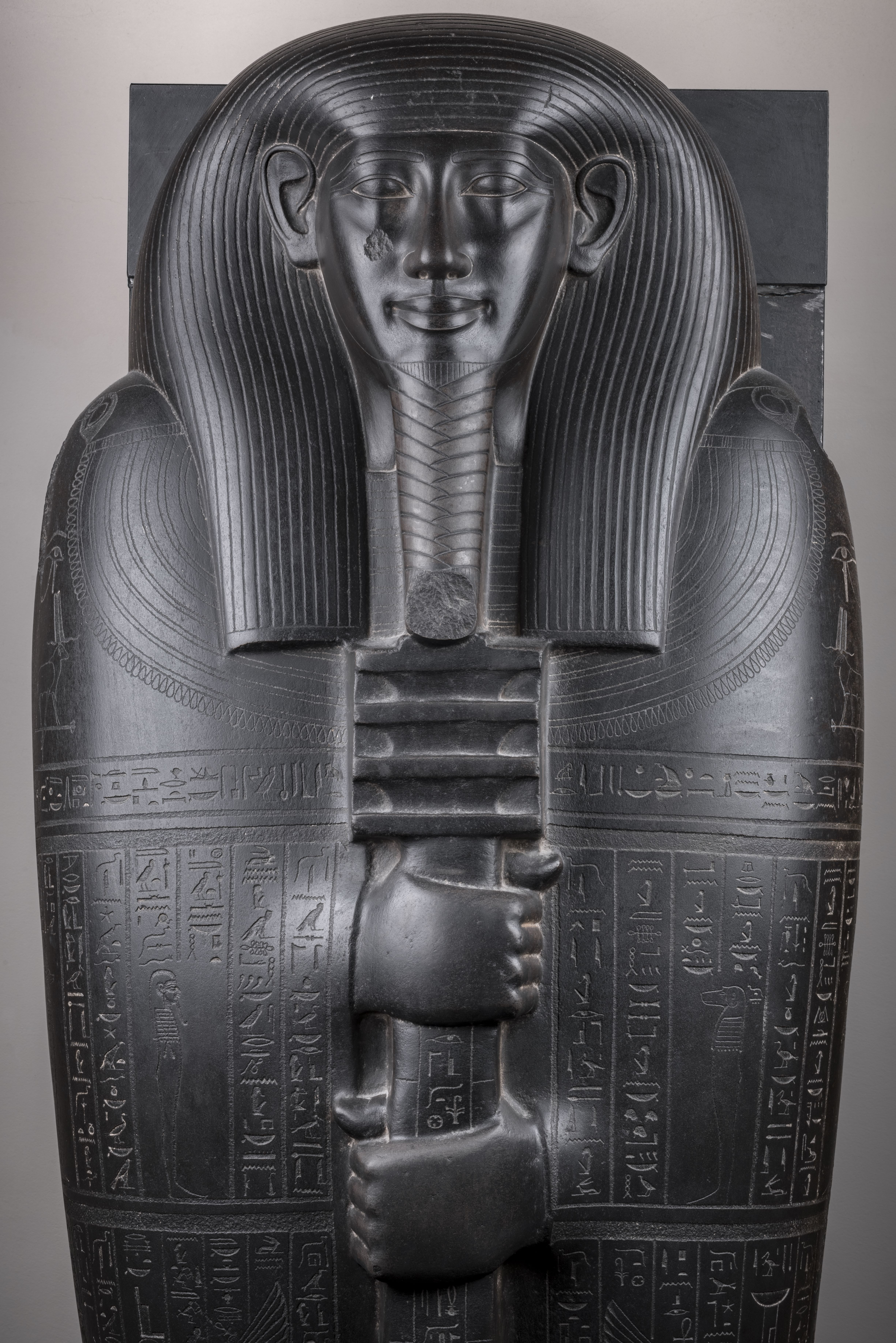
Detail of the upper part of the lid: Ibi is shown as Osiris, with his hands emerging from the shroud to grasp the djed-pillar, a symbol of his resurrection.

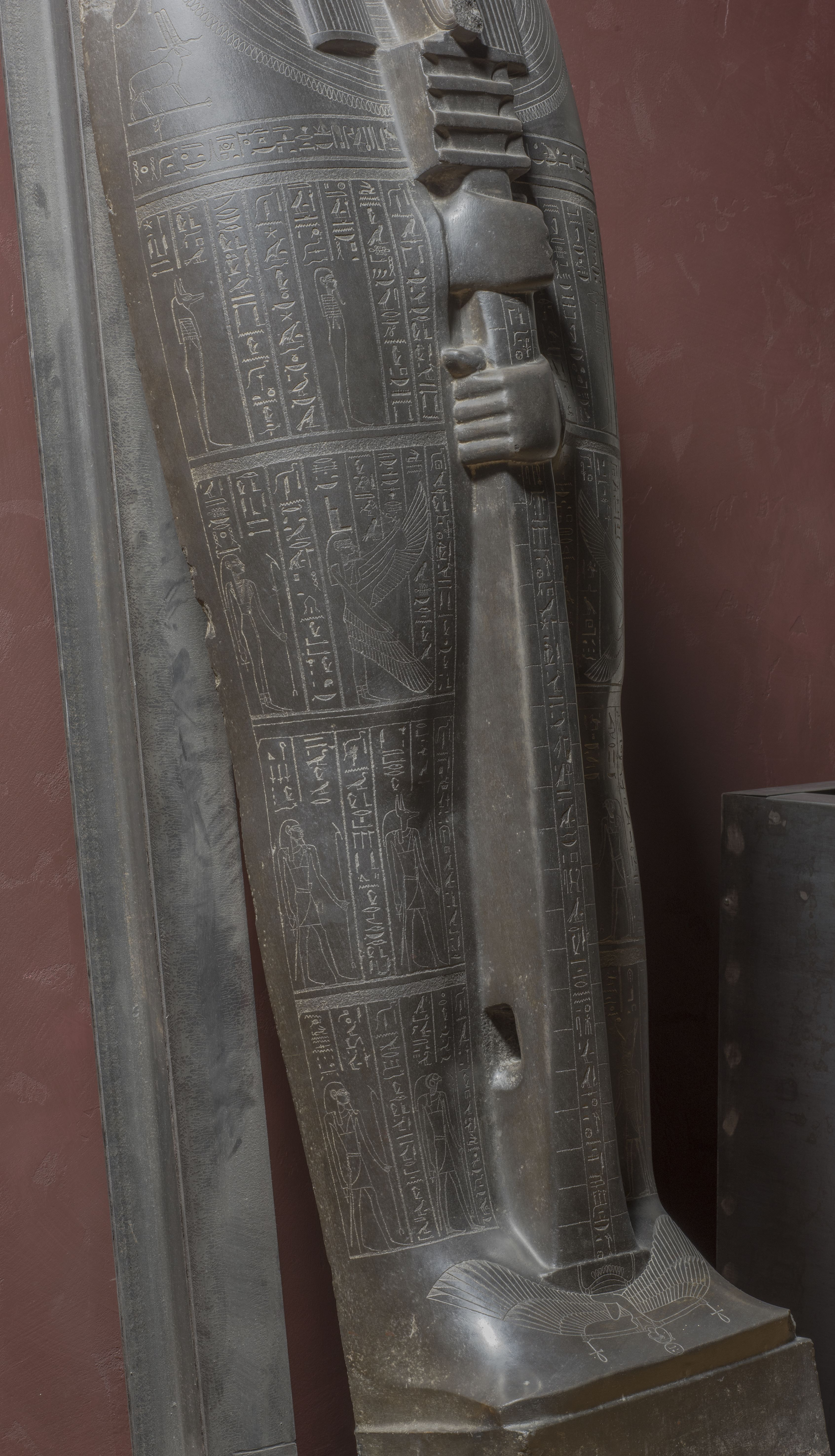
Detail of the lower part: deities depicted between the mummy bandages assist Ibi on his journey in the afterlife, while the sky-goddess Nut spreads her wings over his feet and holds an ankh.

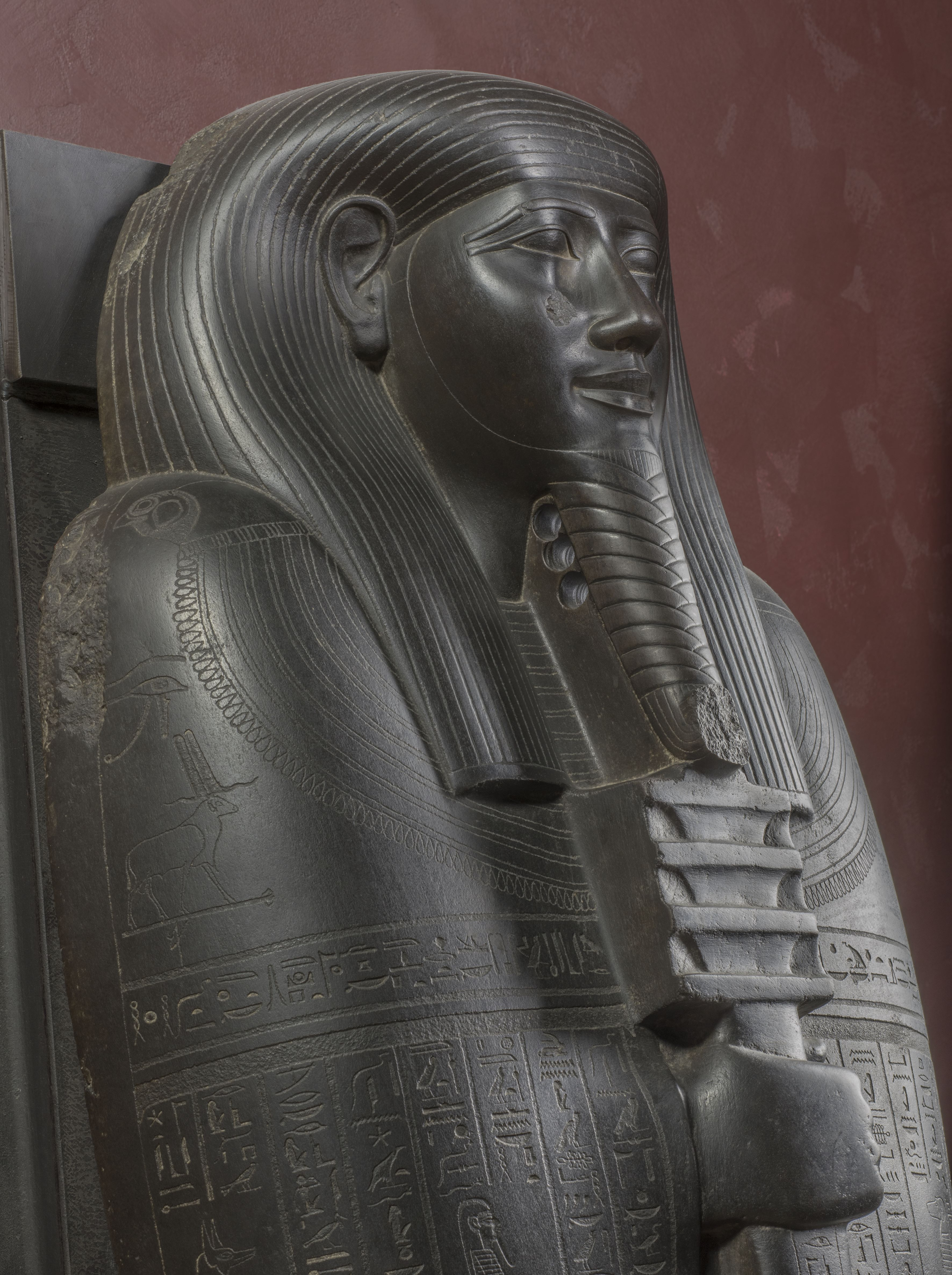
The upper part seen from three-quarter view; three holes beneath the beard and another in the sceptre were probably intended to make the lid easier to move.

== Decoration and layout ==
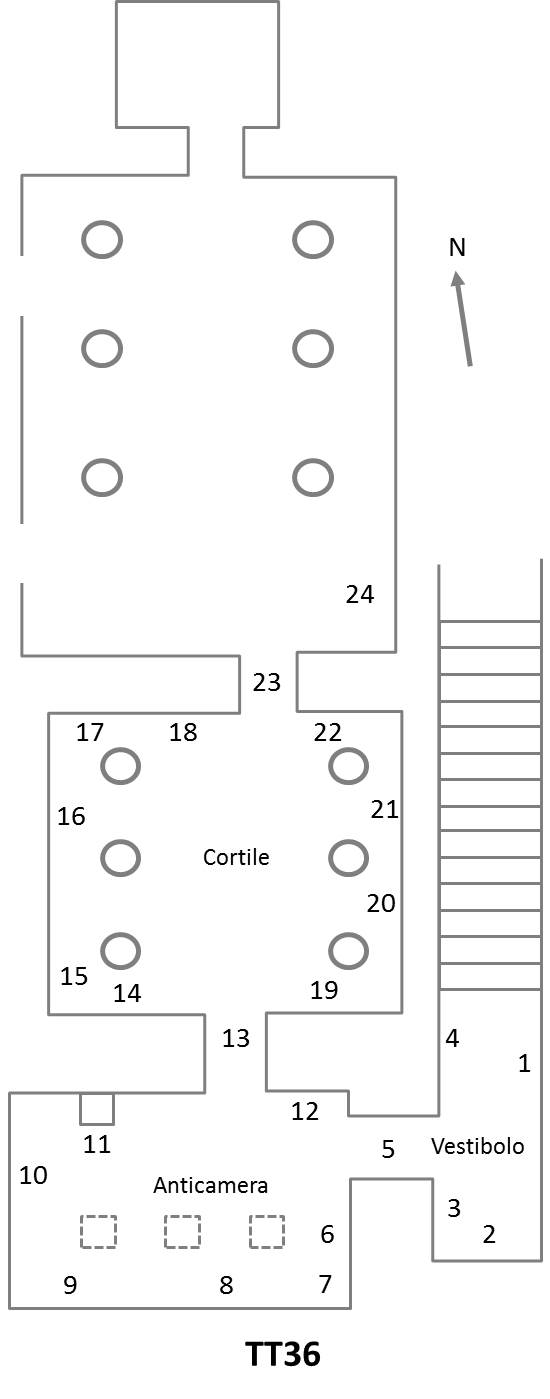
Schematic plan of TT36; the numbering of rooms and walls used below follows Porter and Moss.

Ibi's greywacke sarcophagus lid, dated to 664–610 BCE and found in TT36; it is now in the Museo Egizio in Turin (Cat. 2202/01).

Some scenes in TT36 reproduce scenes from the rock-cut tomb of another Ibi, a nomarch of the 6th Dynasty buried at Deir el-Gabrawi; they reappeared in the Theban tomb about 1,600 years later.

A flight of steps running parallel to the main axis leads to a vestibule, where two superimposed registers (1 on the plan) show offering bearers and offering lists before the seated Ibi, as well as women bringing gazelles before him while he stands. At the far end of the vestibule a now-empty statue niche (2) bears the titulary of Psamtik I and Nitocris I; nearby scenes (3) show Ibi with a gazelle beneath his chair and his son Padihorresnet presenting offerings, while another scene (4) depicts Ibi worshipping Ra-Horakhty. The ceiling of the vestibule carries Ibi's titles.

A corridor (5), decorated with texts and scenes in which Ibi makes offerings to Amun-Ra and Psamtik I appears before Osiris and Horus, leads to an antechamber that originally contained three pillars. On the walls are a Hathoric pillar (6), followed by four priests pouring libations for Ibi and his mother (7); along the long wall (8), Ibi, dressed in Old Kingdom style, oversees sandal-makers, sculptors, metalworkers, chariot-makers, carpenters, potters, goldsmiths, boat-builders and scribes, while farther along (9) he watches dancers, singers, harpists and flautists, together with games including a hand game and a board game resembling draughts. A stela (10) is flanked by the titulary of Psamtik I and Nitocris I and includes Ibi's wife Shepenernute and an address to the living; another Hathoric pillar (11) bears autobiographical texts and a scene of a bull and seven cows in the presence of the Souls of Pe and Nekhen. A further relief (12) represents the Souls of Pe with a mummiform Ra-Horakhty and four sacred oars, while the ceiling carries texts of adoration. The lost central pillars were also Hathoric and bore texts copied by Lepsius, including invocations to Osiris and Montu.

A short corridor (13), whose walls carry texts, offering bearers, the Horus name of Psamtik I and remains of a dedication to Psamtik I and Nitocris I, opens into a colonnaded court. Its walls show priests and attendants presenting offerings to Ibi and his mother Teiri (14), a statue niche (15) bearing the cartouches of Nitocris I and Shepenupet I, and Ibi with an offering list and the emblem of Nefertem (16). Other scenes represent the funeral procession and pilgrimage to Abydos (17), followed by a stela on which Ibi worships Osiris and a goddess (18). On another wall, two registers show a son making offerings to Ibi and his mother and Ibi with his mother before a stela of Horus (22); seven superimposed registers depict the funeral procession, boats and mourning women, together with a chest drawn by cows and calves and associated with the Four sons of Horus (21). Another pair of registers (20) shows a son presenting bouquets to Ibi and a second son, whose name survives only as -monthu, standing before him with hunting spoils, including lions, and agricultural produce.

A further corridor carries texts (23), admonitions to the living and a hymn to Osiris, leading into another pillared antechamber decorated with officiating priests followed by Anubis carrying clothing before Isis and Nephthys; sacred and offering texts were inscribed on the columns.

Several doorways lead to additional burial chambers whose decoration shows that TT36 was reused in the Ptolemaic period. The greywacke lid of Ibi's sarcophagus, measuring 26 × 62.5 × 195 cm and dated to the reign of Psamtik I (664–610 BCE), was found in TT36 and is now preserved in the Museo Egizio in Turin (Cat. 2202/01); it entered the museum through the purchase of the Bernardino Drovetti collection in 1824.

Exterior views of TT36 at El-Assasif

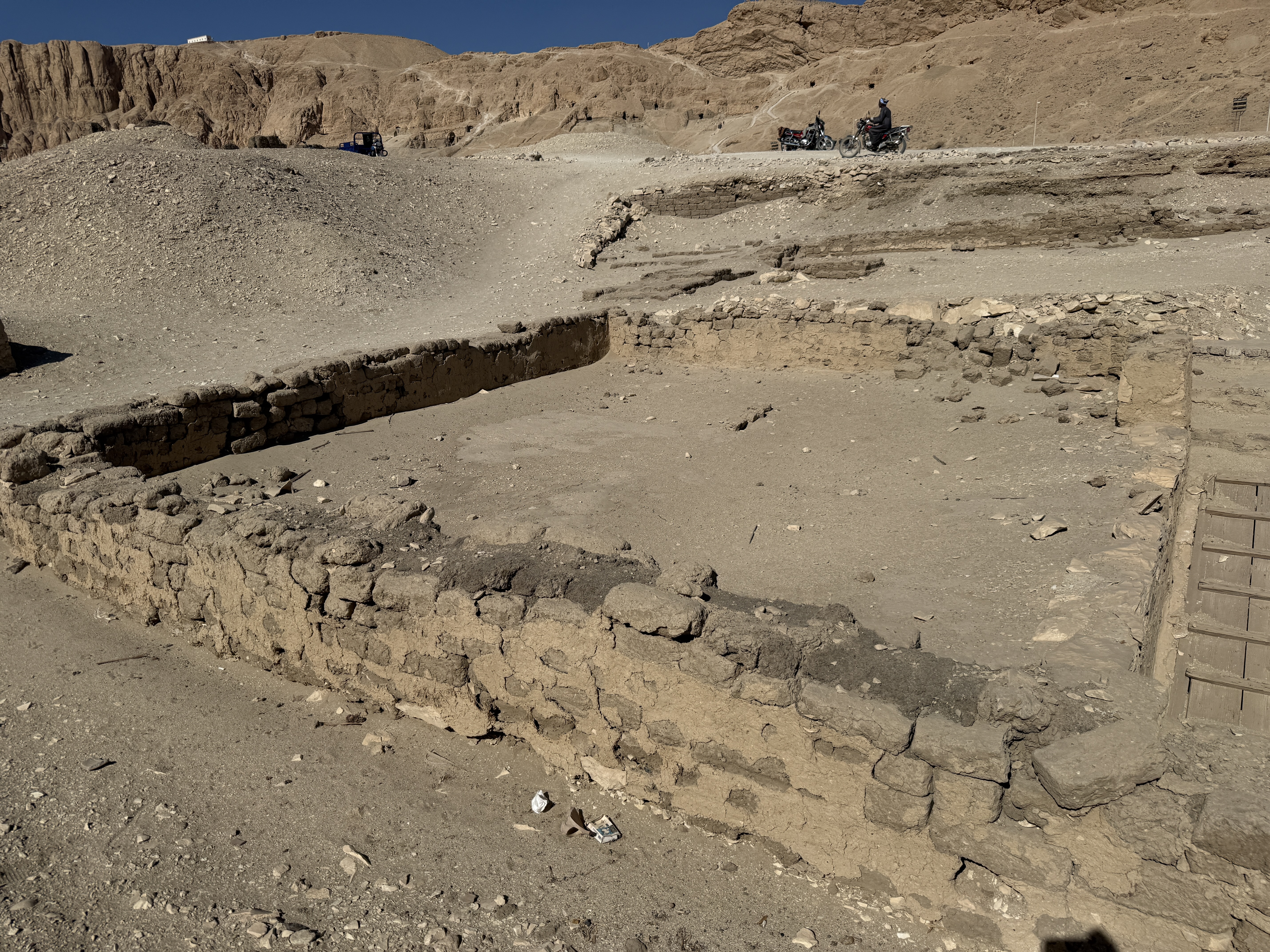

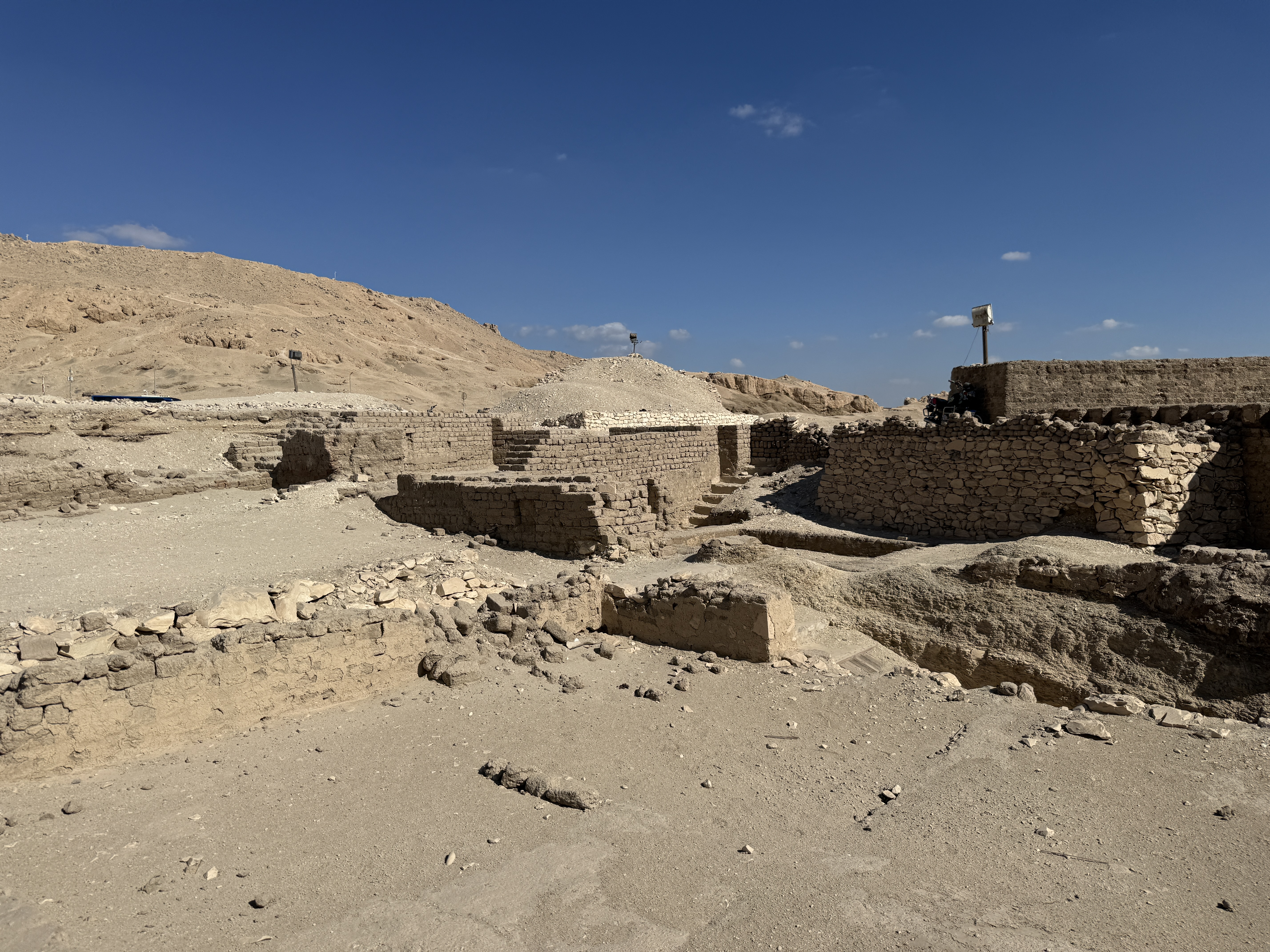

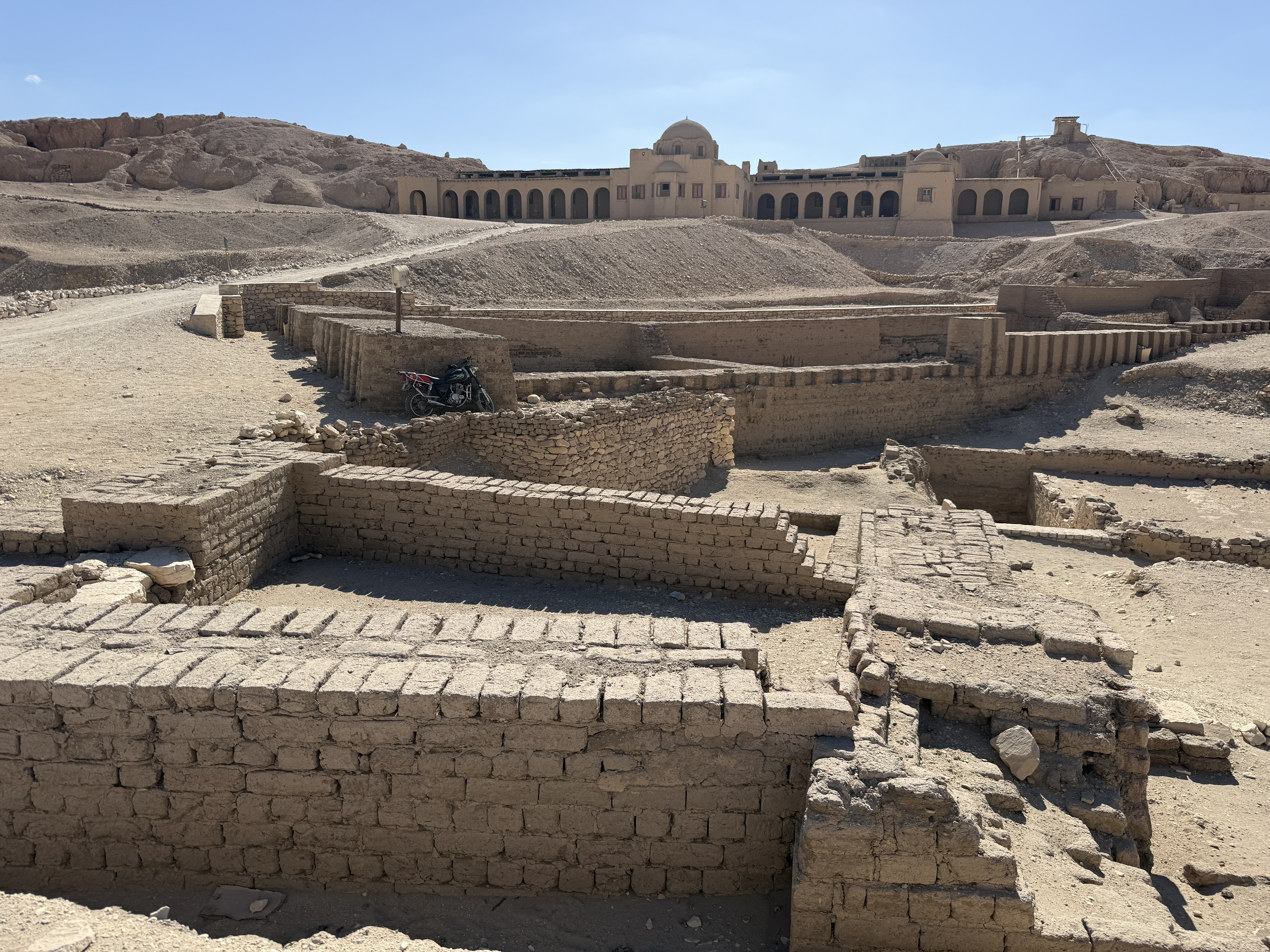

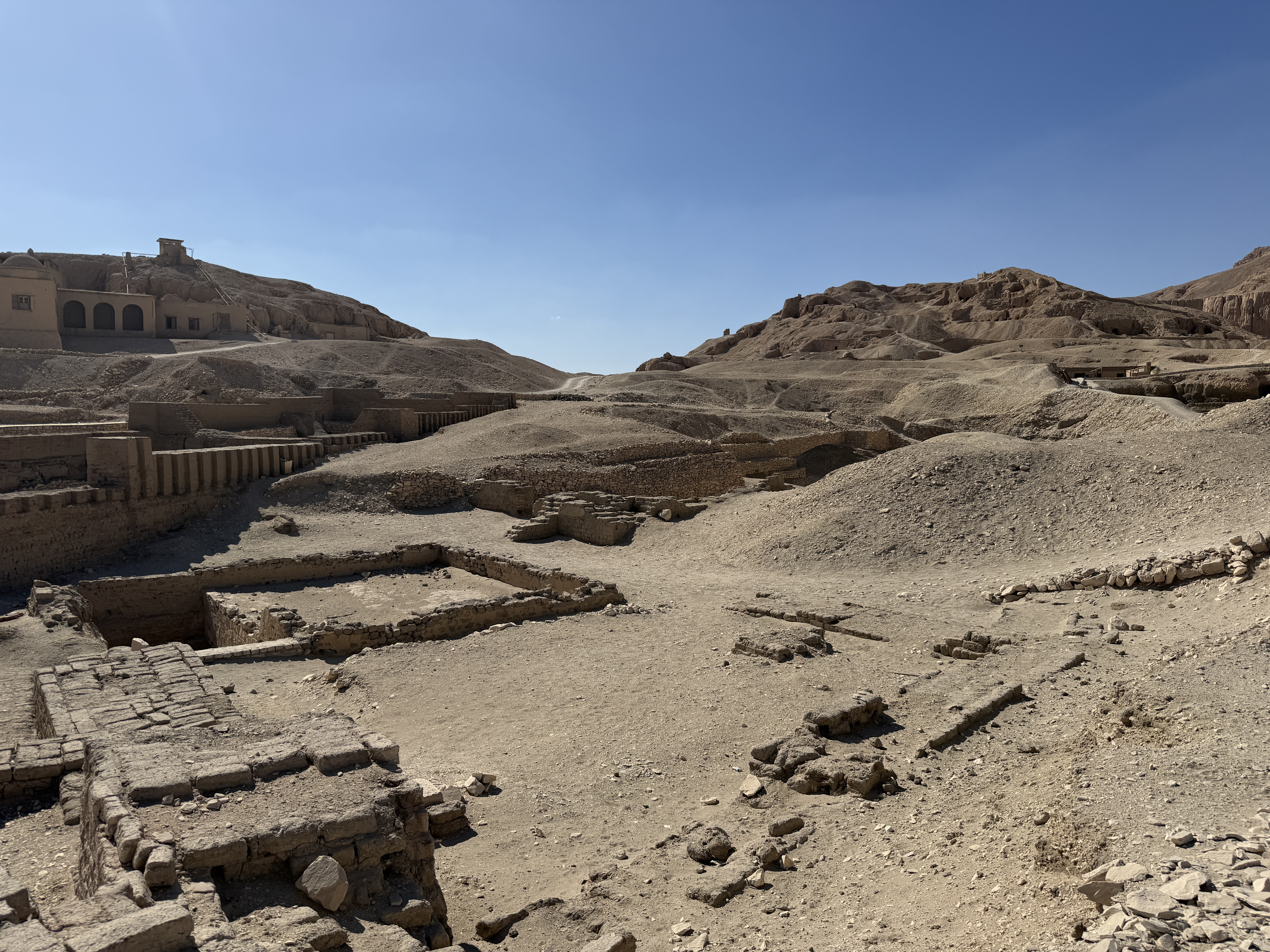

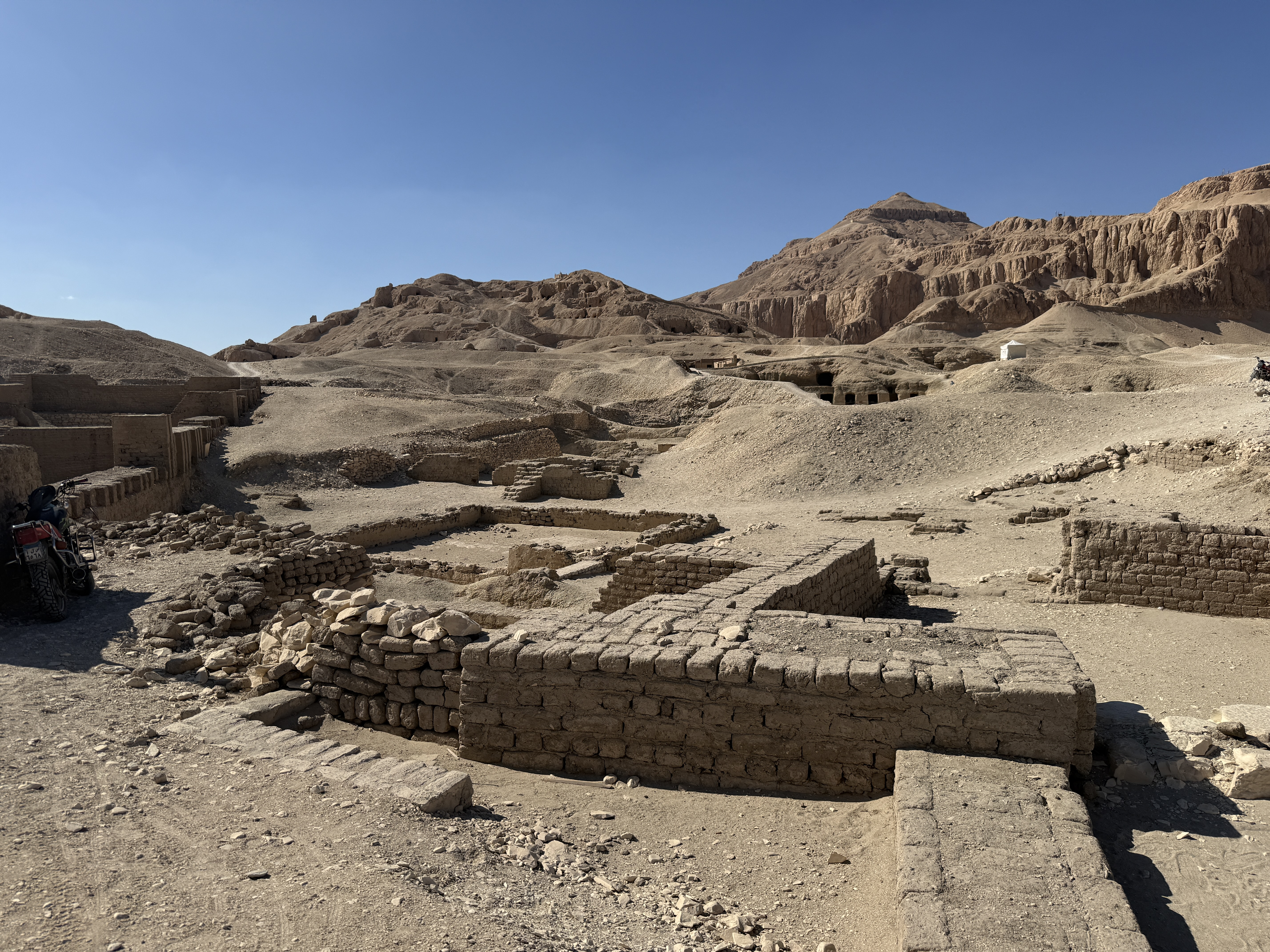

== See also ==
- List of Theban tombs

== Bibliography ==
- Kuhlmann, Klaus-Peter (1983). Das Grab des Ibi, Obergutsverwalters der Gottesgemahlin des Amun (thebanisches Grab Nr. 36), Band I: Beschreibung der unterirdischen Kult- und Bestattungsanlage [The tomb of Ibi, chief steward of the god's wife of Amun (Theban tomb no. 36), Volume I: Description of the underground cult and burial complex]. Deutsches Archäologisches Institut - Archäologische Veröffentlichungen, vol. 15. Mainz: Philipp von Zabern, ISBN 3-8053-0044-1.
- Wagner, Mareike (2024). Das Grab des Ibi. Theben Nr. 36, Band II: Die beiden Sarkophage des Ibi und die Sargkammer des Psametik [The tomb of Ibi. Thebes No. 36, Volume II: The two sarcophagi of Ibi and the coffin chamber of Psametik]. Deutsches Archäologisches Institut - Archäologische Veröffentlichungen, vol. 131. Wiesbaden: Harrassowitz, ISBN 978-3-447-11833-0.
