= TT37 =

Theban tomb

Coordinates: 25.7343°N 32.6112°E

Theban tomb TT37
- Burial site of Harwa
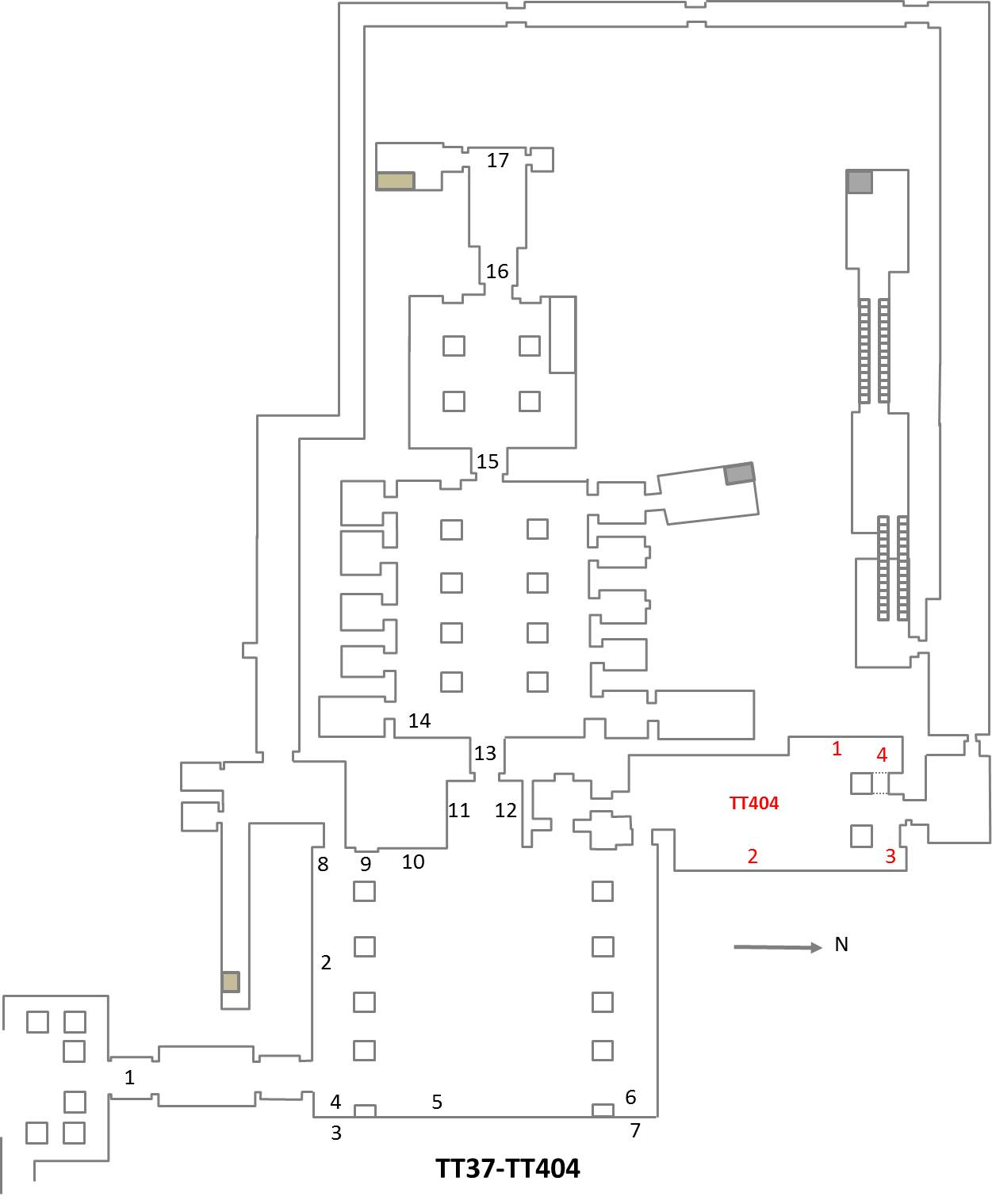

- Location within Egypt
- Location: El-Assasif, Theban Necropolis
- Discovered: 25th Dynasty
- ← Previous; TT36 Next → TT38

M16 r V4
Harwa
in hieroglyphs
Era: 3rd Intermediate Period
(1069–664 BC)

The Theban Tomb TT37 is located in El-Assasif. It forms part of the Theban Necropolis, situated on the west bank of the Nile opposite Luxor. The tomb is the burial place of the ancient Egyptian Harwa, who was Chief Steward of the God's Wife of Amun, Amenirdis I, during the 25th Dynasty. Harwa was the son of the scribe Pedemut and his wife Estawert.

The tomb consists of a portico, which opens to a pillared court. The court is decorated with scenes showing offerings to Ra-Harakhti, hymns, the mummy of Harwa on a couch, and offerings. At the back of the court the entrance to TT404 the tomb of Akhamenru, the Chief Steward to the Divine Adoratrice, who served Amenirdis I and Shepenupet II is located.

Close to the entrance to TT404 is also the entrance to the outer hall where Harwa is depicted seated with a table of offerings and an offering list. From the outer hall one passes to the inner hall where Harwa is shown being led by Anubis. From the outer hall on passes to the shrine where Harwa appears with Anubis before the Western Goddess. The shrine contains a false door with a statue of Osiris.

== See also ==
- List of Theban tombs
