= Harwa =

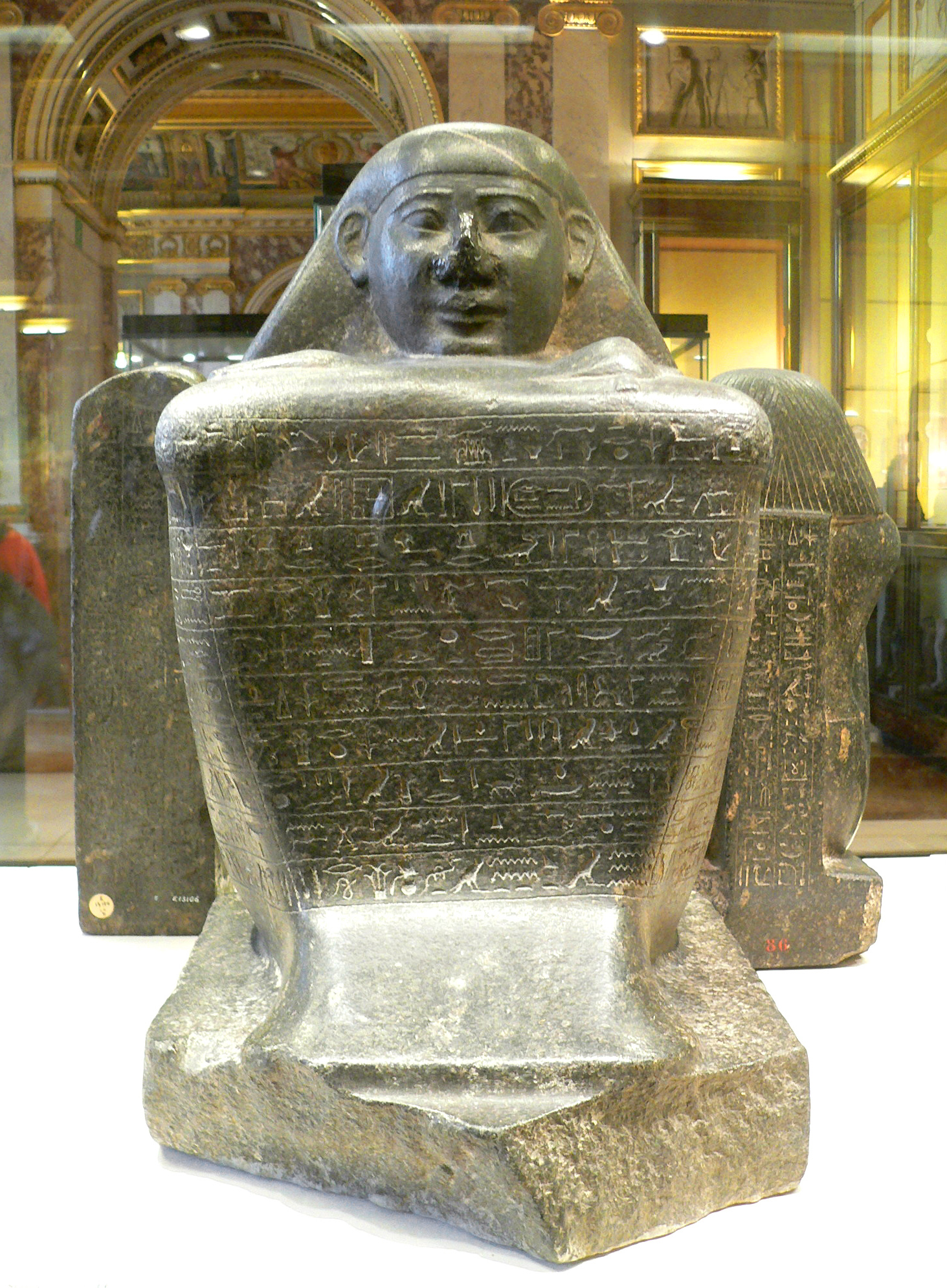
Block statue of Harwa in the Louvre.

The ancient Egyptian official Harwa was the Chief steward of the God's Wife of Amun, Amenirdis I, during the 25th Dynasty.

His tomb, TT37, is located in El-Assasif, part of the Theban Necropolis, on the West Bank of the Nile, opposite to Luxor. The tomb was excavated by the Italian Archaeological Mission to Luxor, under the leadership of Francesco Tiradritti. They started the work in 1995.
