= Amenhotep-Huy =

Vizier of Ancient Egypt

- Vizier of the North
Egyptian name
i mn n Htp t p
- Predecessor: Thutmose
- Successor: Aperel
- Dynasty: 18th Dynasty
- Pharaoh: Amenhotep III
- Burial: K028, El-Assasif, Thebes

Amenhotep-Huy was a Vizier of Ancient Egypt during the reign of Amenhotep III. Besides being Amenhotep III's Vizier, Amenhotep-Huy was also director of Upper and Lower Egypt and overseer of all the works of the King in Upper and Lower Egypt.

== Life and career ==
There were two Viziers at this time and Amenhotep-Huy served alongside another vizier Ramose. It is not entirely clear who served as Vizier of northern Egypt and who served as Vizier of southern Egypt. Amenhotep-Huy is attested in both the north and the south. He is attested in inscriptions from Gebel el Silsila where he oversaw work in the sandstone quarry.

== Tomb and Burial ==
Amenhotep-Huy owned a tomb, k028, in the Theban necropolis. This tomb was located by Dieter Eigner and identified by Andrew Gordon in 1978 in El-Assasif, Thebes.

A multi-national team led by the Instituto de Estudios del Antiguo Egipto de Madrid and Martin Valentin have been studying the architectural elements of the tomb since 2009. In February 2014, Egyptian Ministry for Antiquities announced what it called conclusive evidence that Akhenaten shared power with his father for at least 8 years, based on the evidence coming from the tomb of Vizier Amenhotep-Huy. Thus, if a co-regency happened, Amenhotep-Huy must have held his high position also during this time. However, this conclusion has since been called into question by other Egyptologists, according to whom the inscription means only that construction on Amenhotep-Huy's tomb started during Amenhotep III's reign and ended under Akhenaten's, and Amenhotep-Huy thus simply wanted to pay his respects to both rulers, carving their names separately rather than simultaneously.
