= TT192 =

Theban tomb

Coordinates: 25.7342°N 32.6117°E

Theban tomb TT192
- Burial site of Kheruef called Senaa
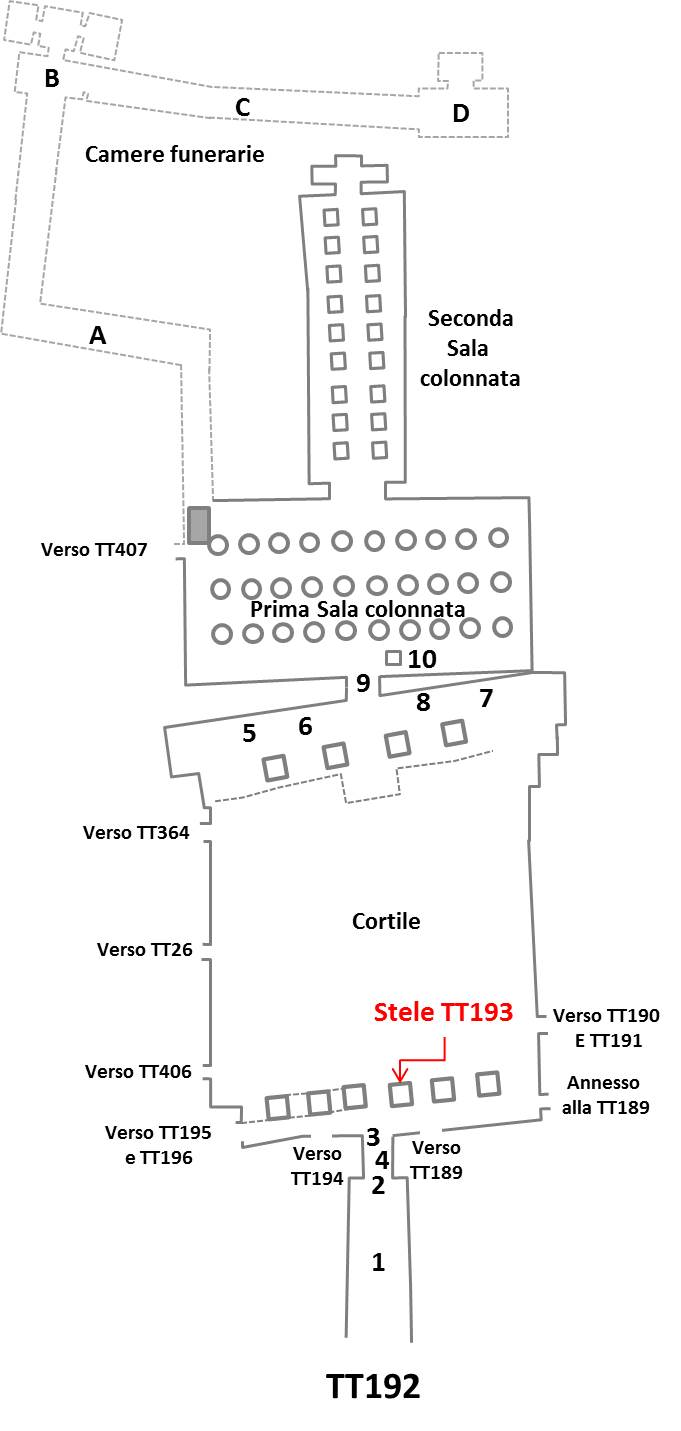
- Reliefs from Kheruef's TT192 tomb

- Location within Egypt
- Location: El-Assasif, Theban Necropolis
- ← Previous; TT191 Next → TT193

g r A3 B1 Z2 f called Y3
Kheruef called Senaa
in hieroglyphs
Era: New Kingdom
(1550–1069 BC)

Tomb TT192, located in the necropolis of El-Assasif in Thebes, Egypt, is the tomb of Kheruef, also called Senaa, who was Steward to the Great Royal Wife Tiye, during the reign of Amenhotep III. It is located in El-Assasif, part of the Theban Necropolis. Tomb 192 in the Theban necropolis is the largest private tomb known from the 18th Dynasty.

Kheruef's tomb was decorated between the final years of Amenhotep III and the beginning of the reign of Akhenaten although it was never finished. Kheruef's titles "true royal scribe", "steward of the royal palace of the Great Royal Wife" Queen Tiye--the wife of Amenhotep III and mother of Akhenaten. He appears to have been unmarried since nothing is mentioned about his wife or family in his TT192 tomb

== TT192 complex ==
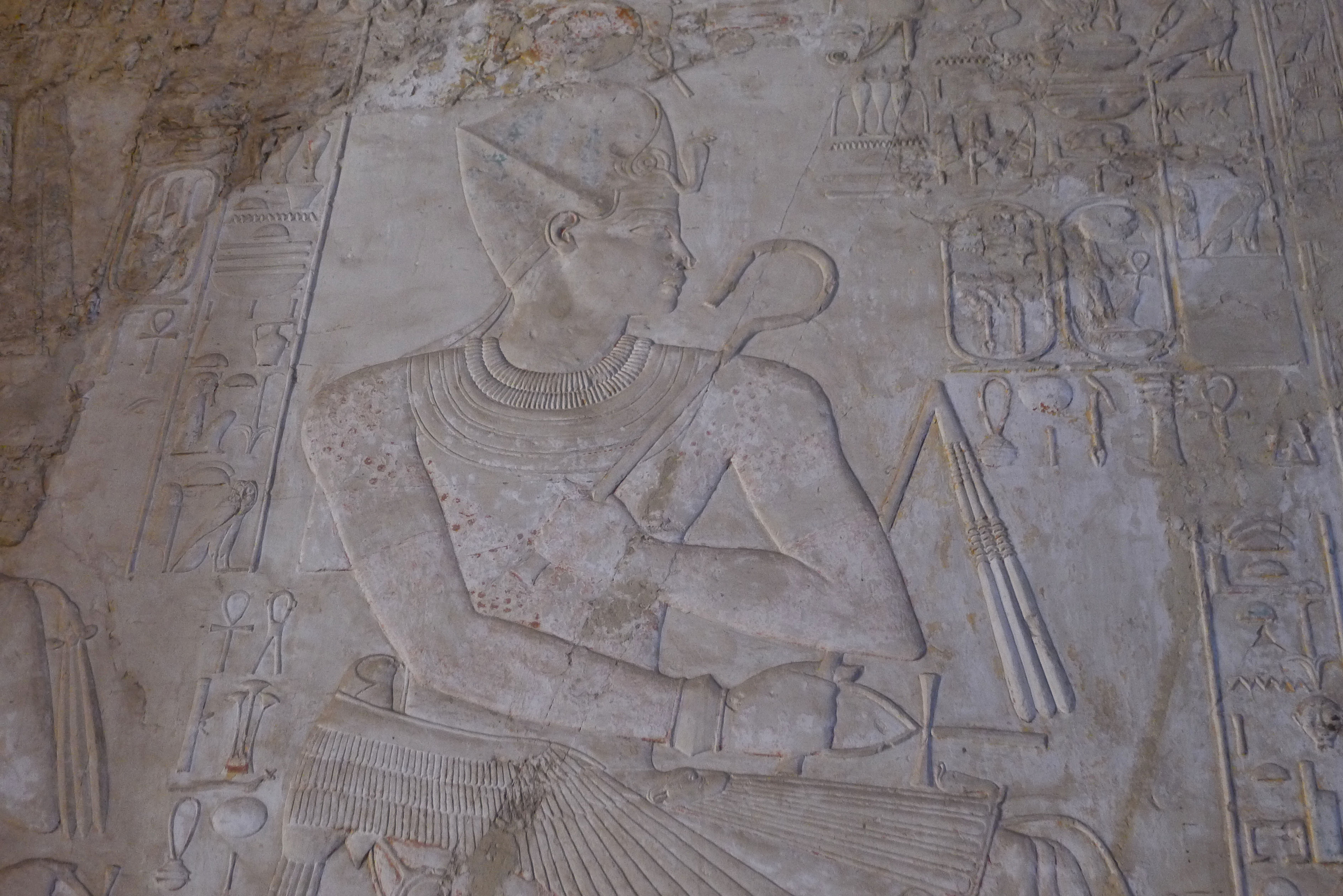
Amenhotep III celebrates his final Year 37 heb sed jubilee in tomb TT192

The tomb of Kheruef is large enough to have several later tombs associated with it, or placed within its substructure. These tombs date from the 19th Dynasty all the way to the late period. A ramp led into a 30 × 30 metre open courtyard, surrounded on all sides by 10 × 1 1/2 metre fluted columns. Beyond this was a wide room, which, unusually, was expanded into an enormous columned hall with ten fluted columns and 2 × 10 metre papyrus bundle columns. A corridor with a double row of ten papyrus bundle columns led down into the depths. This opened into cult chapels surrounded on three sides by statue niches. From the columned hall, a steep corridor, changing direction three times, led into the burial chamber 40 metres below the rock. The tomb remained unfinished and is now heavily damaged.

On the facade of the portico: (5/black) on two superimposed registers scenes of Heb-Sed celebrations appear; in two scenes, Amenhotep III and Tiye (?) appear on a boat pulled by priests while some women cheer from the shore; a little further on, the two sovereigns themselves leave the palace preceded by priests with banners, eight princesses with vases, dancers preceded by baboons, birds in flight and calves. Below, priests, one of whom is masked, dancers, musicians and singers. Followed by (6) scenes of the deceased (?) being awarded, with text dated to Year XX of Amenhotep III who, with Tiye and Hathor, is under a pavilion. Beyond a door that gives access to a colonnaded court, the deceased, with texts of the third Heb-sed festival of Year 37 of Amenhotep III, followed by attendants offers vases and collars to the king and Tiye while a female sphinx tramples prisoners and other tied prisoners, Syrian and Nubian, are represented on the queen's throne together with the Nine Bows[N 14][10]. In a scene below, the deceased is represented eight officials. A little further on; on two registers, Amenhotep III and Tiye followed by sixteen princesses with sistrums and ceremonies of raising a Djed pillar; two rows of dancers and singers with hymns to Ptah, bearers of offerings, singers with drums and castanets and dancers from the oases; followed by some men dancing with papyrus stalks. In smaller scenes, boats carrying provisions, butchers and cattle.

A short corridor of TT192, on whose walls Amenhotep IV/Akhenaten and Queen Tiye worship deities and make offertory texts with hymns to Ra, leads to a colonnaded court in which, in the south-east corner, tomb TT407 opens. In the colonnaded court, the lower part of a statue of a seated figure with the names of the deceased's parents. A corridor leads to a second colonnaded court; here, on the walls, graffiti in hieratic by a certain Khaemopet, son of Ashakhet, and graffiti by other scribes appear.

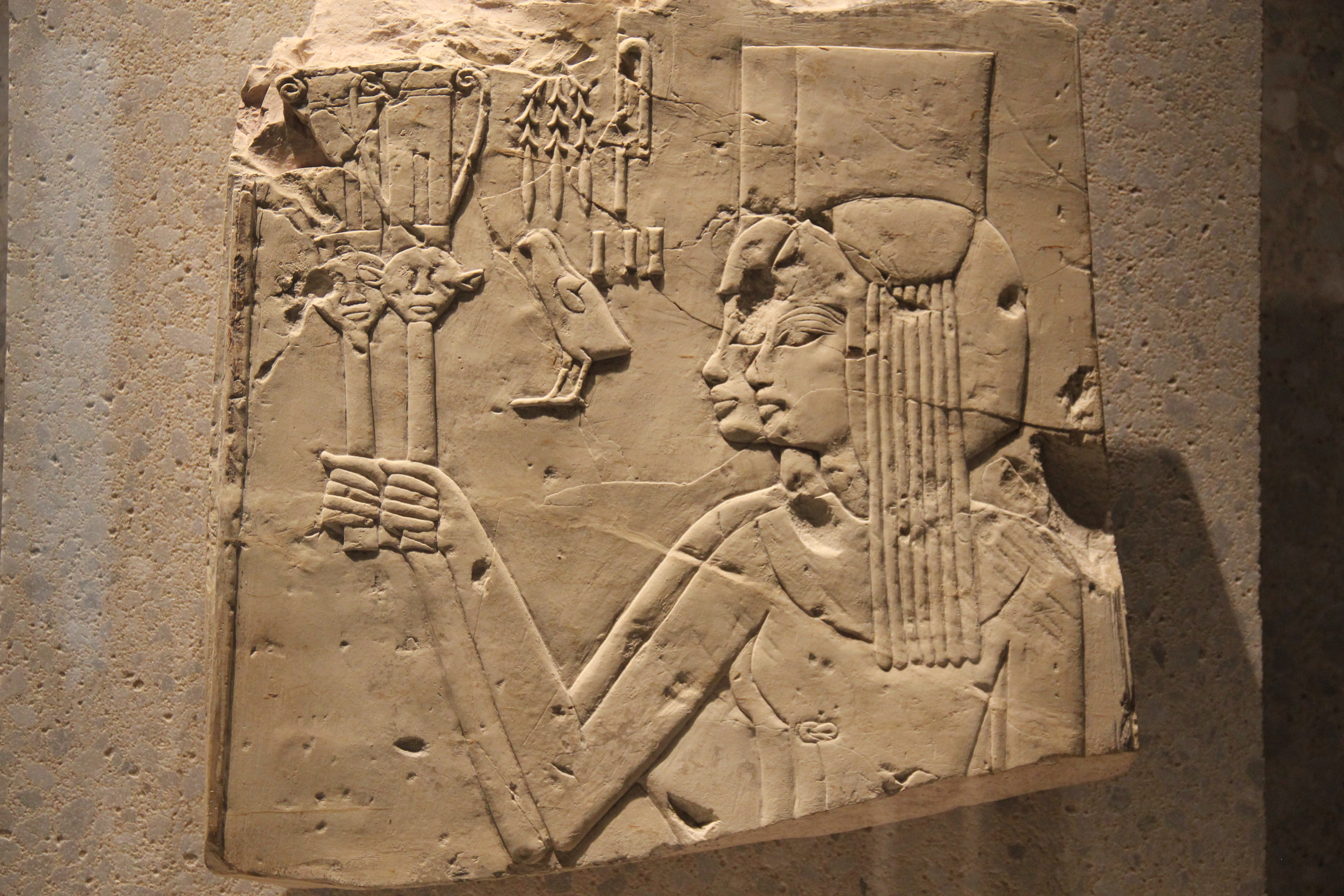
Fragment of a relief of two princesses with sistras, who were daughters of Amenhotep III; from TT192, the Tomb of Kheruef.

Despite the political power of the tomb owner, or perhaps because Kheruef was considered a "strong man" of the previous regime under Amenhotep III, despite the imposing dimensions of the entire complex and the decorations that still survive, Kheruef's tomb was never completed and was actually abandoned. In the first colonnaded hall, right in the south-west corner, where the access to the underground areas opens, the ceiling had collapsed causing the collapse of some of the columns and making the hypogeum apartment unusable; other collapses affected areas of the eastern courtyard causing the accumulation of large quantities of debris which, however, had the archaeological merit of preserving the wall paintings in this the area. Although this could be one of the hypotheses used to justify the tomb's abandonment, political and religious reasons cannot be excluded considering the passage from Amenhotep III to his son, Amenhotep IV, who changed his name to Akhenaten. This could also be confirmed, in the choice of Aten as the dynastic god under Akhenaten, by the work of erasures done to the name of Amun, also performed in TT192, at least in the reachable parts of the tomb, erasures done to the name of Kheruef in TT192 and the fact that his images did not escape this damnatio memoriae, and they were in turn erased in every point where they could be reached despite the recorded tomb collapse.

- Tombs TT189 (Nakhtdjehuty), TT190 (Esbanebdjed) and TT191 (Wahibre-nebpehti) have their entries on the east side of the north wall of the courtyard of Kheruef's tomb. The tombs date to the Late Period.
- Tombs TT189 (Nakhtdjehuty) and TT194 (Thutemhab) have entrances off the east side of the courtyard of TT193. A stela of TT193 is located in front of these structures.
- Tombs TT195 (Bakenamun), TT196 (Padihorresnet), TT406 (Piay) and TT364 (Amenemhab) have entries located on the south wall of the courtyard.
- Tomb TT407 (Bintenduanetjer) is located off the south side of the first columned hall of Kheruef's tomb.

== Decoration ==
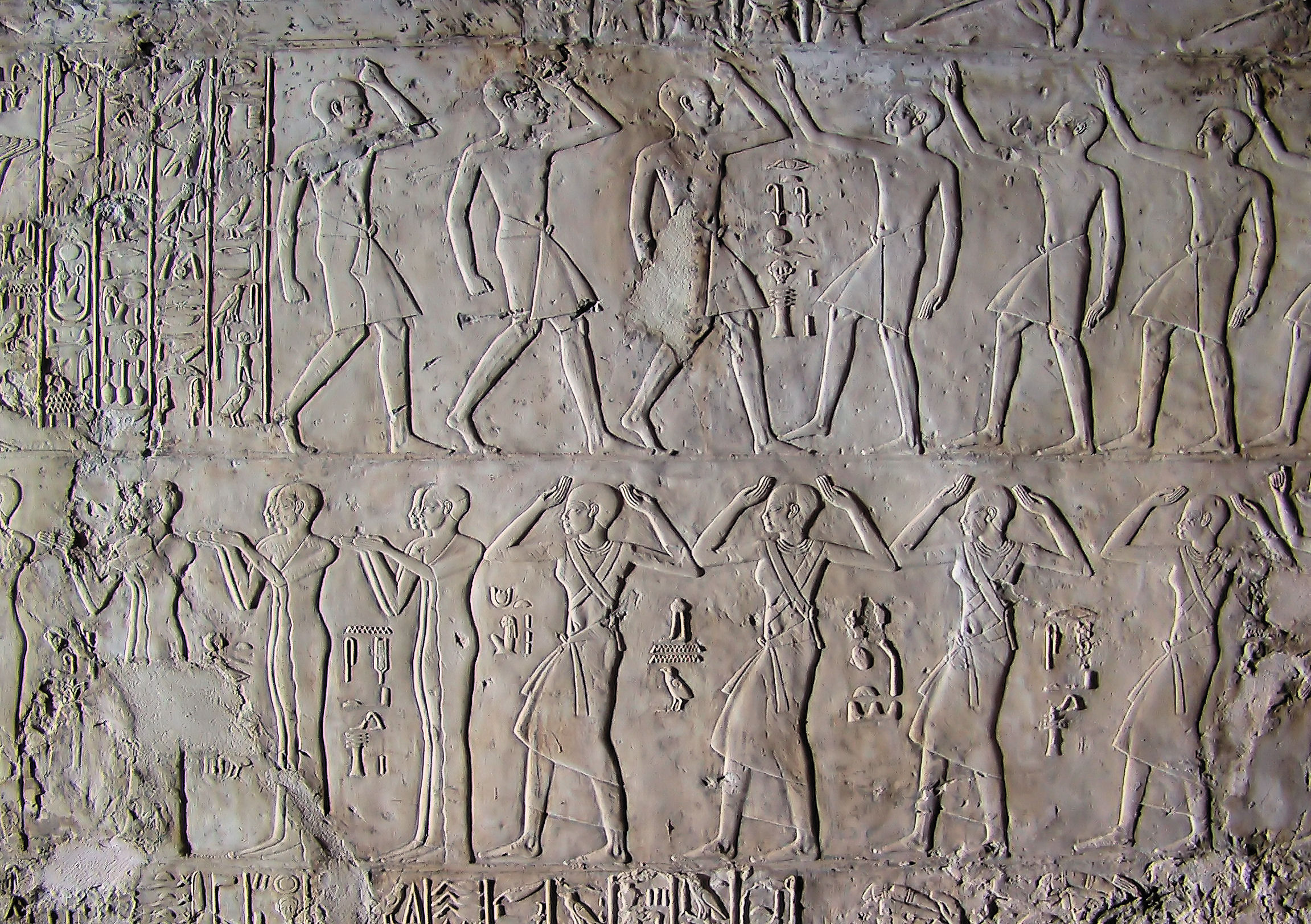
Reliefs showing Singers and Dancers from Kheruef's TT192 tomb.

The reliefs in the tomb contain depictions of Tiye, Amenhotep III (shown as a weak and elderly figure in some decorations) and Akhenaten (named as Amenhotep). Hence, its decoration program started late in the final years of Amenhotep III and the earliest phase of Akhenaten's reign.

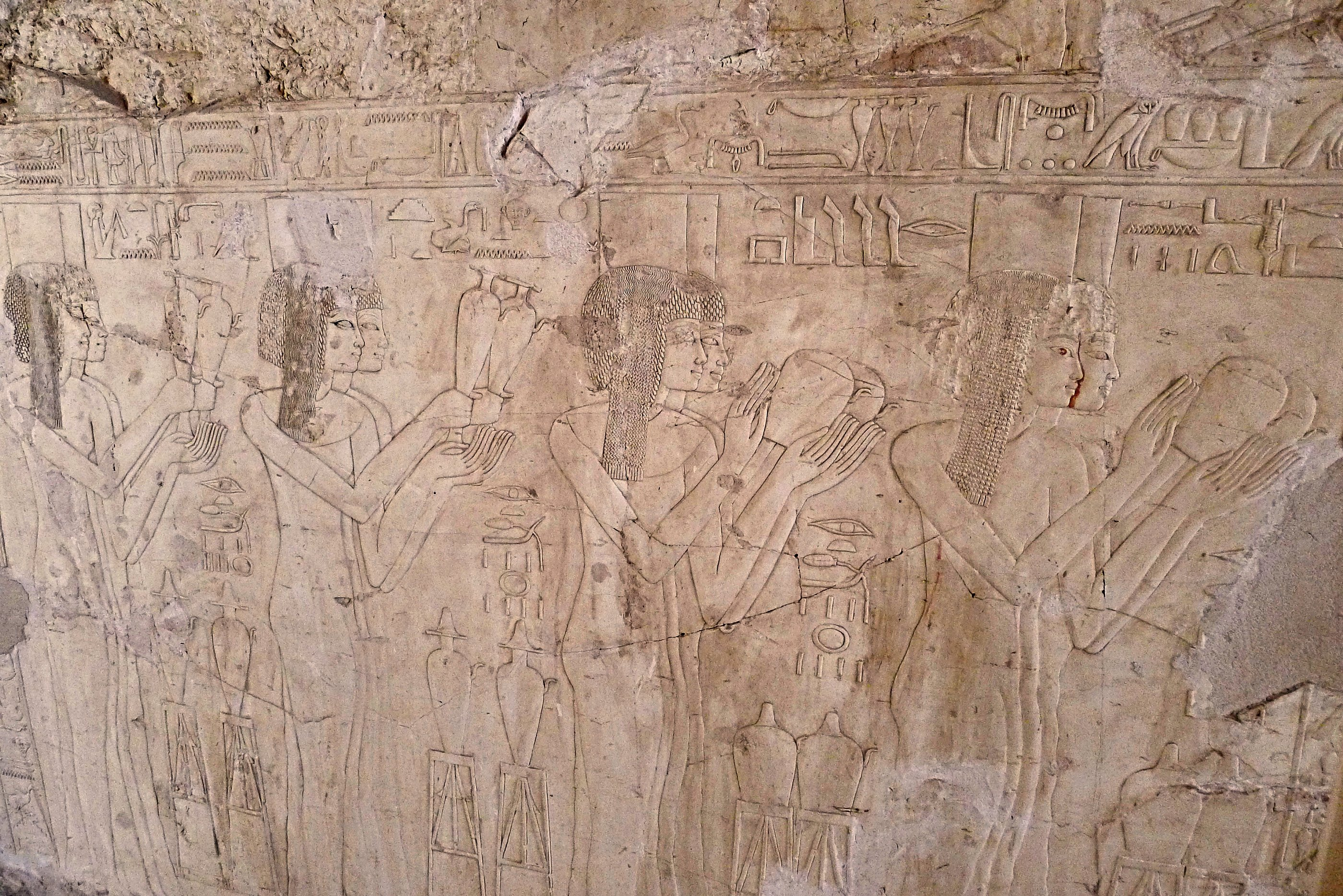
The Daughters of the Great Ones pouring libations before Amenhotep III on the occasion of his first Heb Sed jubilee in his 30th Year.

== See also ==
- List of Theban tombs
