= Ibi (Egyptian noble) =

Egyptian noble

- Chief steward of the God's Wife of Amun
- Detail of the sarcophagus lid of Ibi. Museo Egizio, Turin.
Egyptian name
i b i A1
- Dynasty: 26th Dynasty
- Pharaoh: Psamtik I
- Burial: El-Assasif, TT36

The ancient Egyptian noble Ibi (sometime transliterated as Aba or Abe) was chief steward of the God's Wife of Amun, Nitocris I, during the reign of the 26th Dynasty pharaoh Psamtik I. He was married and had several children.

He was buried in a tomb of modest size, TT36, located in the El-Assasif district of the Theban Necropolis, opposite Luxor, in Egypt. It is quite atypical that both the outer and inner sarcophagi were human-shaped and made of stone. The lid of his inner sarcophagus, the only completely preserved part, is exhibited in the Museo Egizio of Turin, Italy.

Lid of the sarcophagus of Ibi. Museo Egizio, Turin.

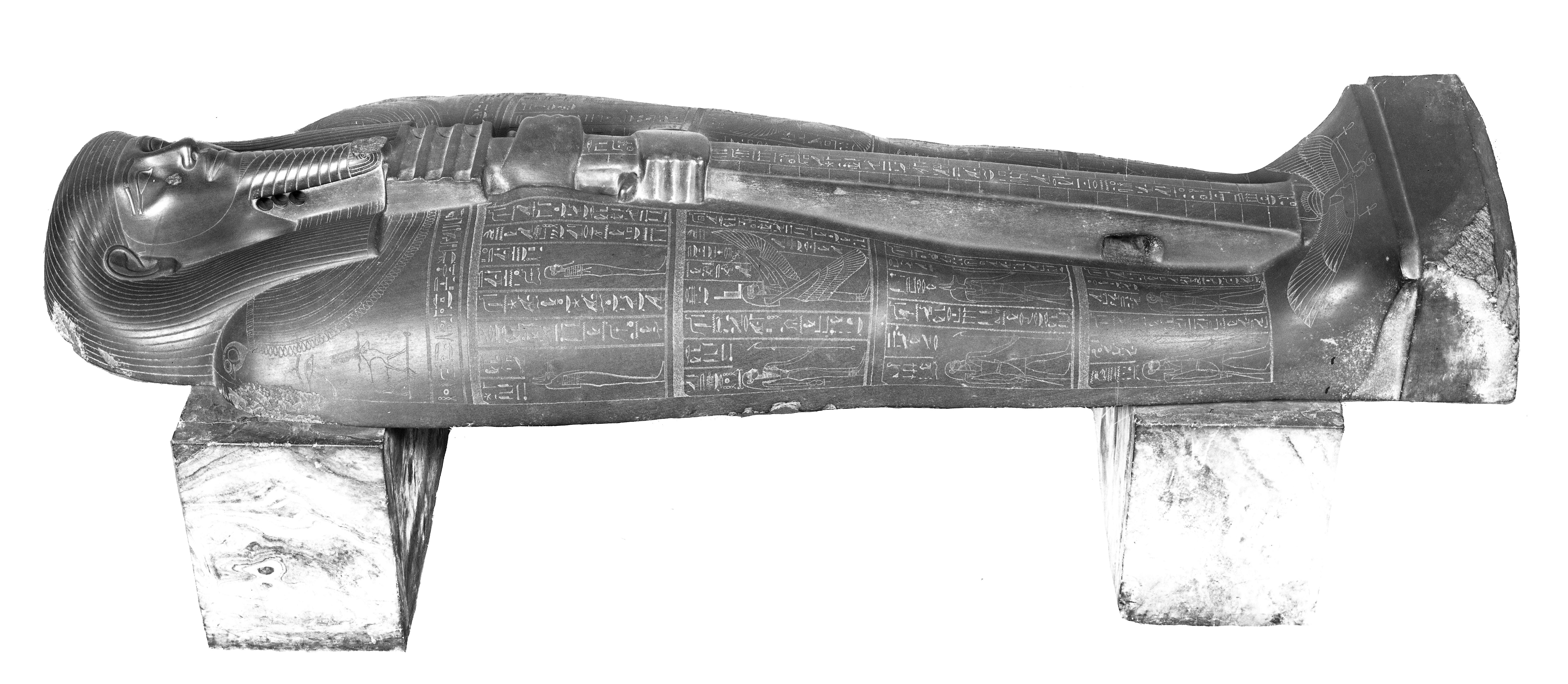
Lid of the sarcophagus of Ibi

== Bibliography ==
- Kuhlmann, Klaus-Peter (1983). Das Grab des Ibi, Obergutsverwalters der Gottesgemahlin des Amun (thebanisches Grab Nr. 36), Band I: Beschreibung der unterirdischen Kult- und Bestattungsanlage [The tomb of Ibi, chief steward of the god's wife of Amun (Theban tomb no. 36), Volume I: Description of the underground cult and burial complex]. Deutsches Archäologisches Institut - Archäologische Veröffentlichungen, vol. 15. Mainz: Philipp von Zabern, ISBN 3-8053-0044-1.
- Wagner, Mareike (2024). Das Grab des Ibi. Theben Nr. 36, Band II: Die beiden Sarkophage des Ibi und die Sargkammer des Psametik [The tomb of Ibi. Thebes No. 36, Volume II: The two sarcophagi of Ibi and the coffin chamber of Psametik]. Deutsches Archäologisches Institut - Archäologische Veröffentlichungen. Vol. 131. Wiesbaden: Harrassowitz. ISBN 978-3-447-11833-0.
