= El-Assasif =

Ancient necropolis in Egypt

Coordinates: 25°43′58″N 32°36′47″E

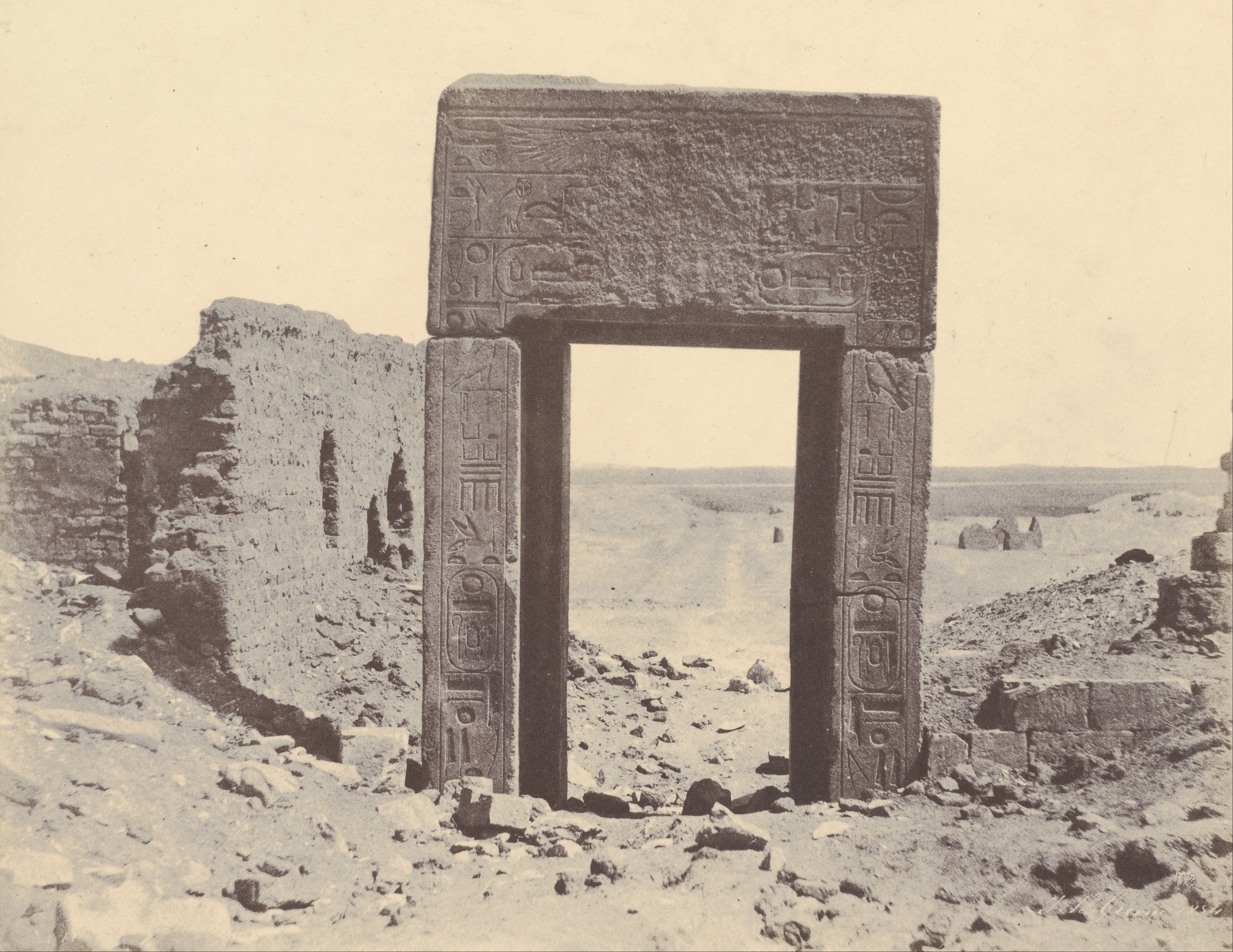
1854 view through the granite upper gate of the temple of Hatshepsut at Deir el-Bahari, looking down into the plain of the Assasif, by John Beasley Greene

El-Assasif (Arabic: العساسيف) is a necropolis near Luxor on the West Bank at Thebes, Egypt, Upper Egypt. It is located in the dry bay that leads up to Deir el-Bahari and south of the necropolis of Dra' Abu el-Naga'.

El-Assasif contains burials from the 18th, 22nd, 25th and 26th dynasties of ancient Egypt, covering the period c. 1550 to 525 BC.

== Archaeology ==
In November 2018, France's University of Strasbourg announced the discovery of two sarcophagi thought to be more than 3,500 years old with two perfectly preserved mummies and approximately 1,000 funerary statues in the Assasif valley near Luxor. One of the tombs with paintings where the female body found, was opened to the public in front of the international media, but the other one was previously opened by Egyptian antiquities officials.

In October 2019, 30 coffins (3.000 year-old) were uncovered and presented, dating back to the Twenty-second Dynasty by the Egyptian archaeological mission in front of the Hatshepsut Temple. The coffins contain mummies of 23 adult males, five adult females and two children. The condition of the cachette is said to be exceptionally good, with many of the coffins sealed and intact, with high quality painting and preservation. According to archaeologist Zahi Hawass, mummies were decorated with mixed carvings and designs, including scenes from Egyptian gods, hieroglyphs, and the Book of the Dead, a series of spells that allowed the soul to navigate the afterlife. Some of the coffins had the names of the dead engraved on them.

In May 2025, a joint Egyptian–Canadian archaeological mission identified the owner of Kampp 23, a rock-cut tomb locatedas Amun Mes, a high-ranking official who served as the mayor of Thebes during the Ramesside period. The tomb featuring a T-shaped layout typical of the 19th–20th Dynasties was first discovered in the 1970s but remained unattributed until recent excavations revealed inscriptions confirming Amun Mes's identity and several of his titles, including tax collector, royal advisor, divine father of Amun, and overseer of quarry expeditions. The team also found evidence of later reuse, such as painted plaster over original reliefs and fragments of ushabti figures.

== Notable burials ==
=== 18th Dynasty ===
- TT192 – Kharuef
- AT28 – Vizier Amenhotep-Huy
- TT188 – Parennefer

=== 22nd Dynasty ===
Cachette currently under investigation and restoration

=== 25th Dynasty ===
- TT34 – Mentuemhet
- TT37 – Harwa

=== 26th Dynasty ===
- TT27 – Sheshonq
- TT33 – Padiamenope
- TT36 – Ibi
- TT279 – Pabasa
- TT389 – Basa
- TT410 – Mutirdis
- TT414 – Ankhhor

== See also ==
- List of Theban Tombs
