= Champollion: A Scribe for Egypt =

2000 documentary film by Jean-Claude Lubtchansky

- Title card
- French: Champollion, un scribe pour l'Égypte
- Genre: Documentary
- Based on: Champollion : Un scribe pour l'Égypte by Michel Dewachter
- Written by: Michel Dewachter
- Screenplay by: Jean-Claude and Carole Lubtchansky
- Story by: Michel Dewachter
- Directed by: Jean-Claude Lubtchansky
- Voices of: Françoise Fabian; Jean-Hugues Anglade
- Music by: Gregor Narholz; Keith Thompson; Susanne Lautenbacher; Robin James Rutherford Jeffrey
- Country of origin: France
- Original language: French

Production
- Producer: Jean-Pierre Gibrat
- Cinematography: Mikaël Lubtchansky
- Editor: Jean-Claude Lubtchansky
- Running time: 52 minutes
- Production companies: Trans Europe Film; La Sept-Arte; Éditions Gallimard; Louvre Museum

Original release
- Network: Arte
- Release: 18 November 2000

Champollion: A Scribe for Egypt (French: Champollion, un scribe pour l'Égypte; German: Jean-François Champollion und die Hieroglyphen) is a 2000 documentary film adapted from French Egyptologist Michel Dewachter's nonfiction book of the same name. Directed by Jean-Claude Lubtchansky, and co-produced by Trans Europe Film, La Sept-Arte, Éditions Gallimard and Louvre Museum, with voice-over narration by French actors Françoise Fabian and Jean-Hugues Anglade, the film retraces step by step the passionate journey that led Jean-François Champollion to decipher Egyptian hieroglyphs.

The documentary was broadcast on Arte on 18 November 2000, as part of the channel's television programme The Human Adventure, and released on DVD by Centre national du cinéma et de l'image animée (CNC). In addition to German dubbing, it has been subtitled into English and Spanish.

== Synopsis ==
The film begins with the historical context: Egyptian Expedition of Napoleon Bonaparte, origin of Egyptology and passion of Jean-François Champollion. An archaeologist, historian and philologist, Champollion was extraordinarily gifted with linguistic talent. As an Egyptologist he broke new ground and gave the world access to the chronicles of the pharaohs. Champollion succeeded in deciphering the hieroglyphs via his deep knowledge of Coptic, and opened up new dimensions to imagination: by deciphering infinitely small characters, the immeasurably large world of ancient Egypt opened up its gate, a world that had been silent for two millennia, which fascinated all of Europe.

With the Nile valley as background, and based on Champollion's own writings, the sites he explored, as well as artefacts preserved in the biggest museums—Louvre, British Museum, Museo Egizio—and those in Egypt remained on sites, the film follows his footsteps—from the north to the south of Egypt—from Alexandria to Cairo, Luxor, Karnak, Aswan and Abu Simbel, to make viewers discover the personality of the scientist, decipherer of hieroglyphics and founder of Egyptology, who launched the 19th-century vogue for Egyptomania.

== The book ==
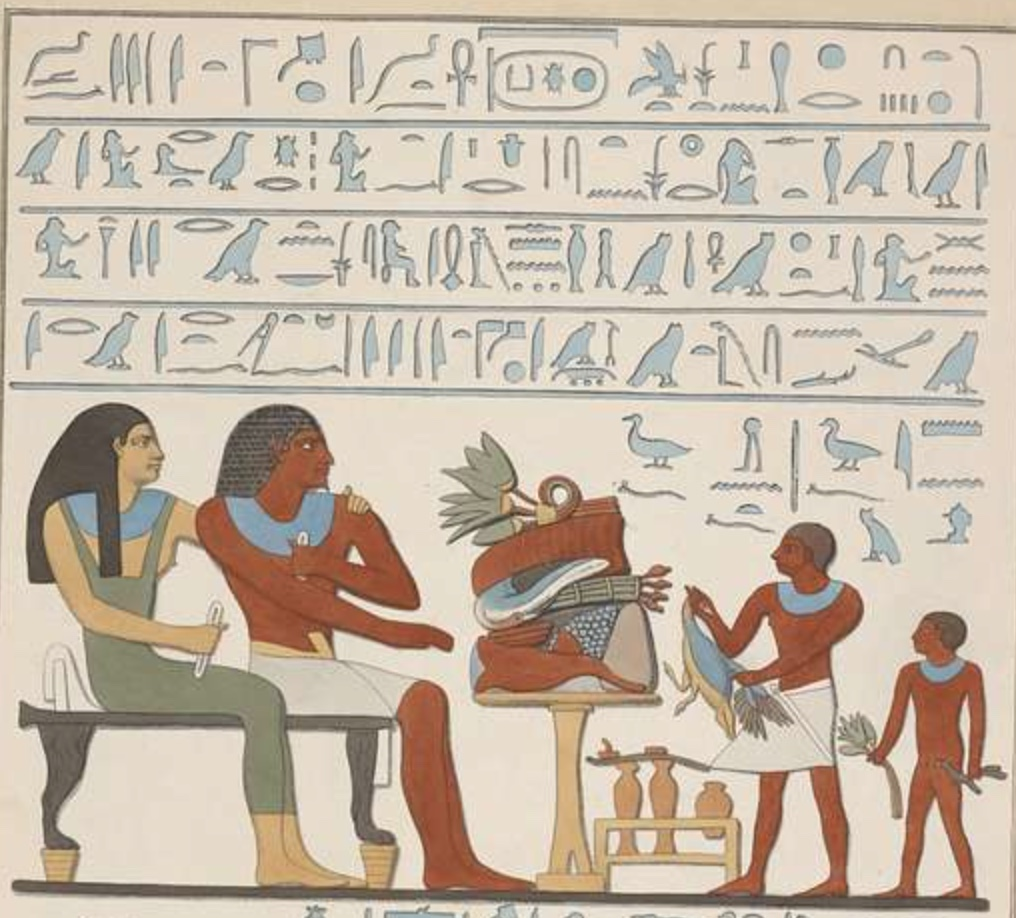
Detail of a stone tablet found in a tomb at Thebes, discovered by the Earl of Belmore. Lithograph made by Charles Joseph Hullmandel (1818), reproduced on the back cover.

The book Champollion: Un scribe pour l'Égypte, on which the film is based, is an illustrated biography of the decipherer of hieroglyphs, published in pocket format by Éditions Gallimard on 23 November 1990. Written by the French Egyptologist and CNRS researcher Michel Dewachter, this work is the 96th volume in the encyclopaedic collection "Découvertes Gallimard", and part of the collection's Archéologie series.

According to the tradition of "Découvertes", which is based on an abundant pictorial documentation and a way of bringing together visual documents and texts, enhanced by printing on coated paper; in other words, "genuine monographs, published like art books".

While many of the French titles from the collection make it into English, this book has never been translated.

== See also ==
- In the 'Découvertes Gallimard' collection:
  - The Search for Ancient Egypt by Jean Vercoutter
  - Mummies: A Voyage Through Eternity by Françoise Dunand
  - The Pyramids of Giza: Facts, Legends and Mysteries by Jean-Pierre Corteggiani
  - Coptic Egypt: The Christians of the Nile by Christian Cannuyer
