= The Search for Ancient Egypt =

1986 book by Jean Vercoutter

- The cover featuring Approach of the Simoom, Desert of Gizeh, from Egypt and Nubia. Lithograph by Louis Haghe after David Roberts, 1846–49.
- Author: Jean Vercoutter
- Original title: À la recherche de l'Égypte oubliée
- Translator: Ruth Sharman
- Illustrator: Dominique Thibault, for pré-générique only (pp. 3–9), et al.
- Cover artist: David Roberts; Louis Haghe
- Language: French
- Series: Découvertes Gallimard●Archéologie (FR); Abrams Discoveries (US); New Horizons (UK)
- Release number: 1^{st} in collection
- Subject: Egyptian archaeology, history of Egyptology
- Genre: Nonfiction monograph
- Publisher: Éditions Gallimard (FR); Harry N. Abrams (US); Thames & Hudson (UK)
- Publication date: 21 November 1986; 23 January 1998 (reed.); 1 February 2007 (new ed.)
- Publication place: France
- English publication date: 1992
- Media type: Print (paperback), e-book for iPad (2012)
- Pages: 224 (first edition); 176 (reedition in 1998); 160 (new edition in 2007); 208 (UK & US editions)
- Awards: Literary prize of the Fondation de France
- ISBN: 978-2-0705-3028-1 (first edition)
- OCLC: 25719895
- LC Class: DT60 .V3613 1992
- Followed by: Vie et mort des baleines

The Search for Ancient Egypt (French: À la recherche de l'Égypte oubliée, lit. 'In Search of Forgotten Egypt') is a 1986 illustrated monograph on the history of the rediscovery of ancient Egypt and of Egyptology. Written by the French Egyptologist Jean Vercoutter, and published by Éditions Gallimard as the first volume in their pocket collection "Découvertes" (known as "New Horizons" in the United Kingdom, and "Abrams Discoveries" in the United States). The book was awarded a literary prize by the Fondation de France in 1987.

== Synopsis and introduction ==
In the 4^{th} century AD, the Christian Emperor Theodosius I decreed the closure of all the pagan temples in the Empire. Unexpected consequence: the hieroglyphic writing, still alive until then, abruptly stopped being understood. The Pharaonic Egypt fell into oblivion. The expedition of Bonaparte in 1798 and the magnificent Description de l'Égypte aroused in Europe a craze for the monuments and the art of this ancient civilisation. The decipherment of hieroglyphs by Jean-François Champollion in 1822 marks the birth of Egyptology.

As part of the Archéologie series, Jean Vercoutter recounts in the book the history of the rediscovery of pharaonic Egypt, from the Graeco-Roman period to the 20^{th} century; and the whole history of Egyptology, its birth and growth, with all the important figures in this discipline; as well as the study of archaeological sites, artefacts and documents discovered in Egypt in the 18^{th} and 19^{th} centuries.

According to the tradition of "Découvertes", which is based on an abundant pictorial documentation and a way of bringing together visual documents and texts, enhanced by printing on coated paper, as commented in L'Express, "genuine monographs, published like art books". The book is almost like a "graphic novel", replete with colour plates.

The Search for Ancient Egypt was one of the bestsellers in France, and is one of the five bestsellers in the "Découvertes" collection, together with Writing: The Story of Alphabets and Scripts. As of 2001, it has sold more than five hundred thousand copies worldwide. The book has been translated into Brazilian Portuguese, Czech, Danish, Dutch (Belgium & the Netherlands), English (UK & US), German, Italian, Japanese, Lebanese Arabic, Lithuanian, Norwegian, Polish, Romanian, Russian, Slovak, Slovenian, South Korean, Spanish (Spain & Hispanic America), Swedish, Turkish, traditional (Taiwan) and simplified Chinese (China), and reprinted several times. The reissued edition underwent a decrease in page length, from 224 pages in 1986 down to 160 pages in 2007. An electronic edition for iPad came out in 2012, including a version enrichie.

== Chapters ==
(Note: This section is a translation adapted from the book review by Luís Manuel de Araújo, a Portuguese Egyptologist. See the original review in Portuguese here:. English titles and texts excerpted from the book are based on the American edition:.)

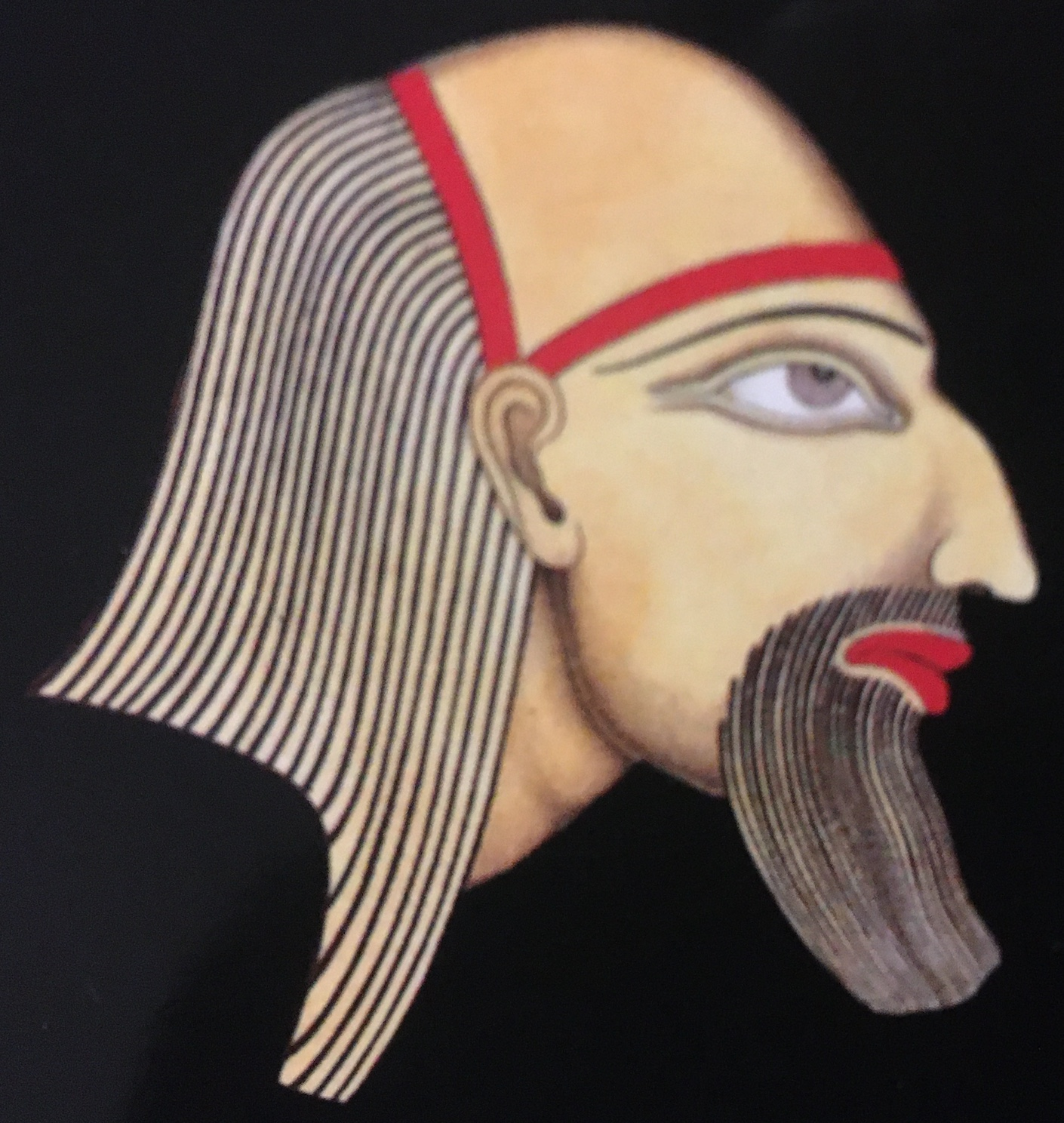
Image on the back cover, by Champollion.

A world of stones. Stones of the pyramids, stones of the temples, stones of the statues. Drowned in the sand, bogged down, forgotten. A world of symbols. Engraved symbols, painted symbols. Mysterious, incomprehensible. A world that would come alive again under the gaze, the pencil, the trowel of travellers, adventurers, scientists, archaeologists. A world that would finally reveal its secrets, in 1822, thanks to Jean-François Champollion.

=== Body text ===
- "Trailer" (pré-générique, pp. 1–9): a succession of full-page illustrations accompanied by texts, created by Dominique Thibault, after painted reliefs from ancient Egypt, such as the relief depicting Ramesses III in the tomb of his son Amun-her-khepeshef (p. 9), among others.
- Chapter I: "The Disappearance of Pharaonic Egypt" (La disparition de l'Égypte des Pharaons, pp. 13–17) evoking the deplorable events that were the destruction of the Library of Alexandria (it is said that there were seven hundred thousand volumes) and the temple of Serapis in the same city, missing in any of the buildings those precious texts which could clarify the gaps that exist today about the history of Pharaonic Egypt. Fortunately other sources remained available, the Bible being one of them, as the author well mentioned.
- Chapter II: "Travelers in Ancient Times" (Les voyageurs de l'Antiquité, pp. 19–27) recalls the journey and texts of Herodotus, "the traveller par excellence", followed later by Diodorus Siculus, Strabo (who was very interested in the animal cults) and Plutarch (who bequeathed us his version of the myth of Osiris and Isis, inspired by Manetho's text, then preserved in a Ptolemaic copy). The Roman Emperors Hadrian and Septimius Severus are also included in the list of those illustrious travellers in the country of the Nile, preceded by the General Germanicus, member of the imperial family in the time of Tiberius.

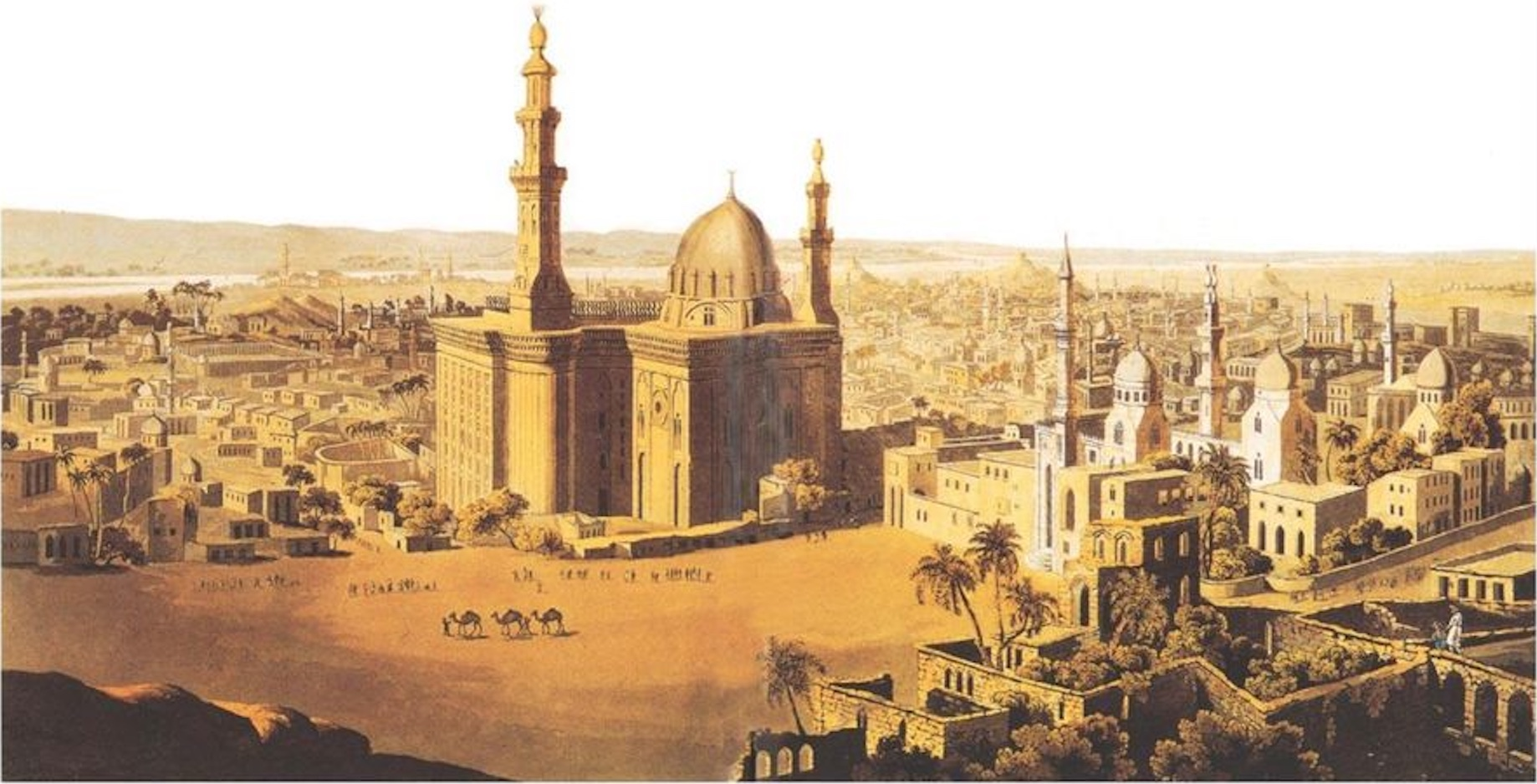
View of Greater Cairo, drawn by Henry Salt, in 1805. Image taken from pages 66–67.

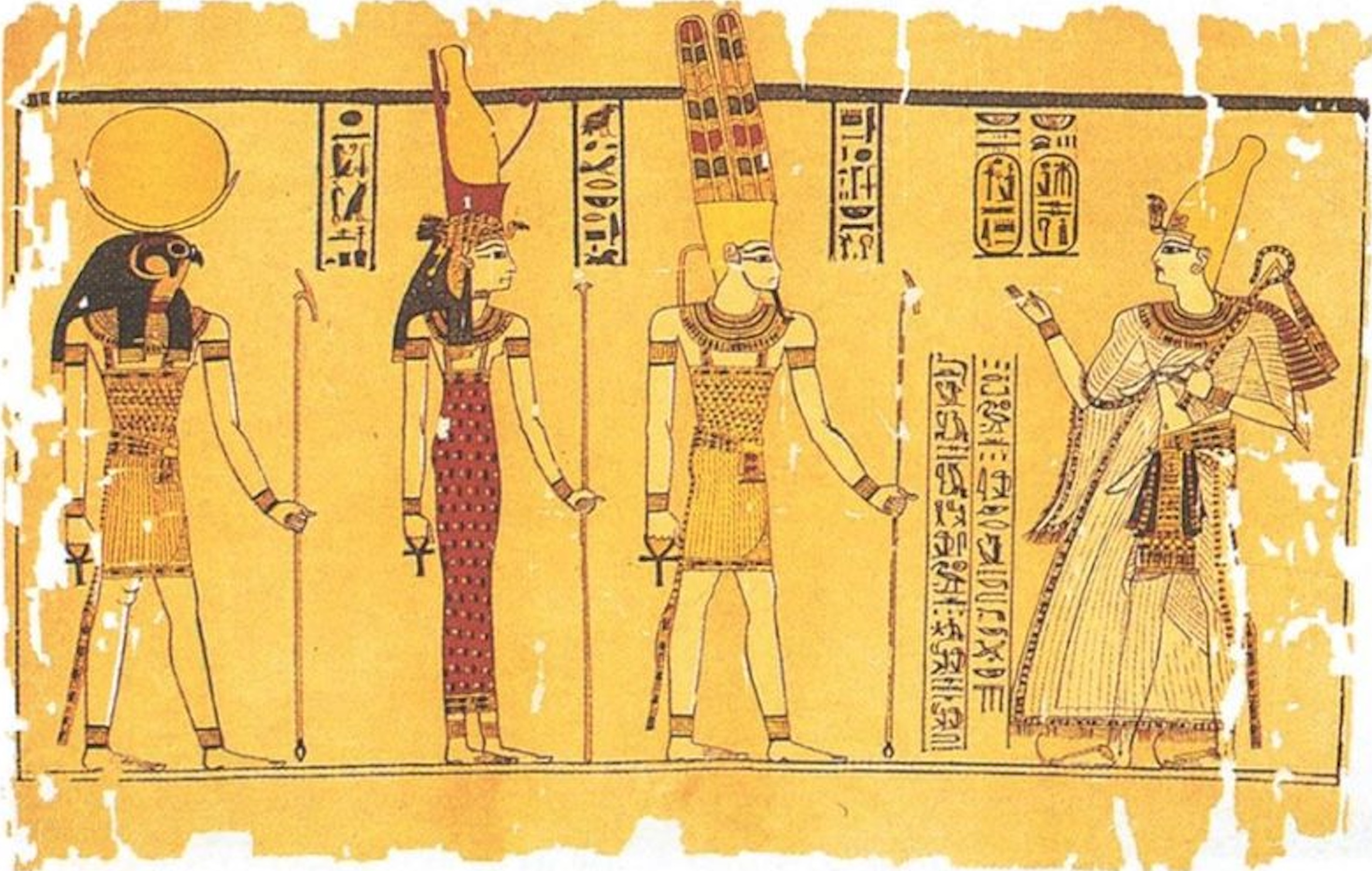
The Harris Papyrus painting, depicting Ramesses III before the Theban Triad: Amun, Mut and Khonsu. Image taken from page 91.

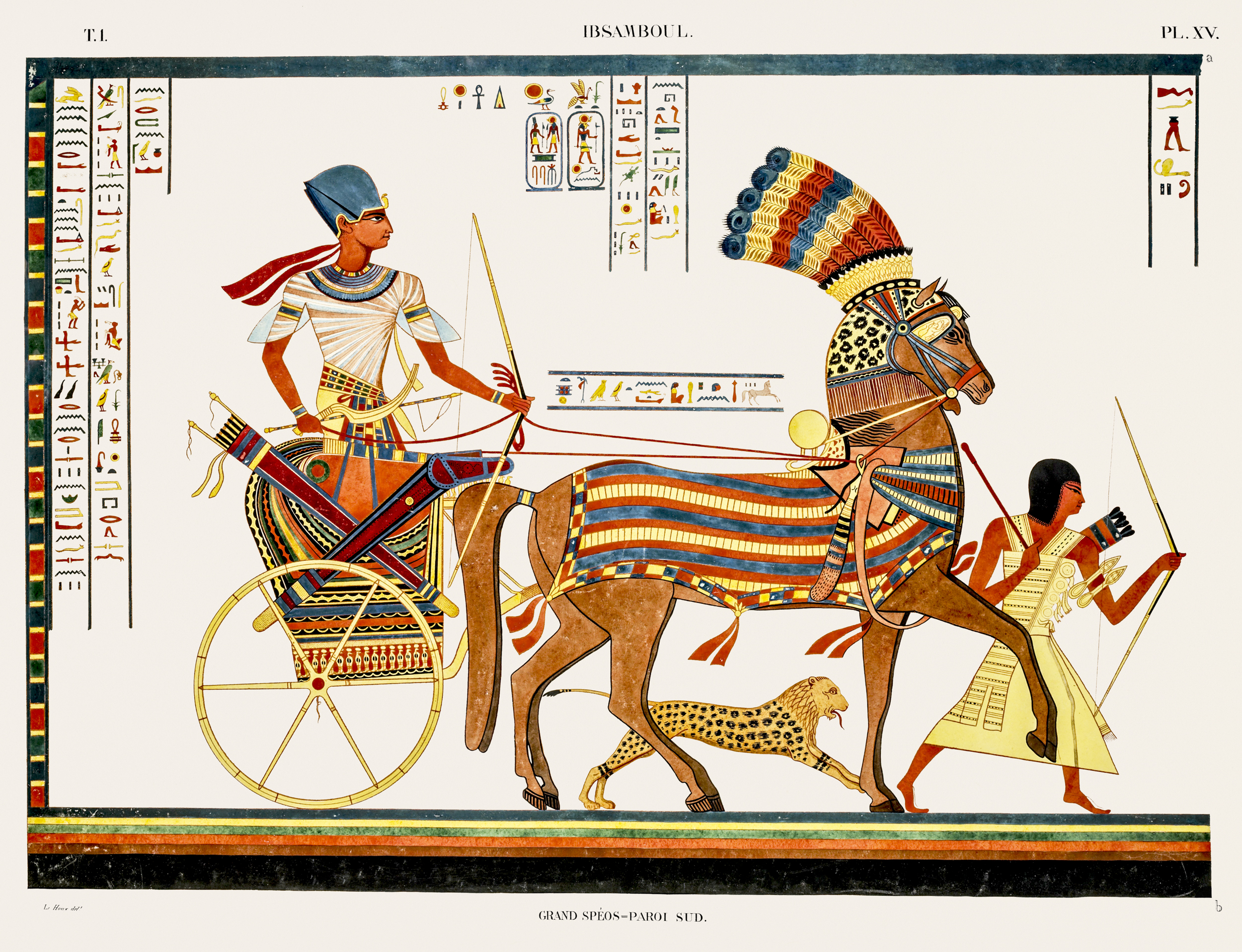
Wall painting from the Great Temple of Abu Simbel, showing Ramesses II driving his chariot. Champollion, Monuments de l’Égypte et de la Nubie, 1845. Illustration reproduced on p. 92.

- Chapter III: "Crusaders, Monks, and Sightseers on the Banks of the Nile" (Croisés, moines et curieux au fil du Nil, pp. 29–51) recalling a time when the doors of Muslim Egypt were virtually closed to the Christian West. It is true that in the time of the Crusades there were some texts emerged to lift the Islamic mantle that covered the historic region, but in any case travellers were scarce in south Cairo. Hence, "none of the accounts from the 1^{st} to the 14^{th} centuries can compare with those of the ancients."^{:29}—at that time no one knew the hieroglyphic texts anymore. Up to the beginning of the 19^{th} century, more or less illustrious visitors (the Dominican Vansleb, Jean de Thévenot, Benoît de Maillet, Claude Sicard, Claude-Étienne Savary, comte de Volney), with special emphasis on General Bonaparte leading his army and his sages.
- Chapter IV: "Treasure Hunters and Thieves" (Aventuriers et voleurs, pp. 53–85) – Bonaparte's expedition resulted in the most fruitful publication of two notable works: Vivant Denon's Travels in Upper and Lower Egypt and Description de l'Égypte. "Between 1802 and 1830 a dozen travelers of note came from France, England, Germany, and Switzerland to see for themselves the wonders revealed by the Travels and the Description".^{:54} It was then that Egypt became, it can be said, fashion. This led to the emergence of Egyptomania and, much more importantly, the birth of Egyptology. Then the author evokes the acts of European consuls and their active persons engaged in the procurement of antiquities (the Great Belzoni was one of them), sometimes using processes closer to prey and looting than meticulous prospecting. It is natural that this should happen in those days when archaeological method was still in development.
- Chapter V: "The Era of the Scholars" (L'Ère des savants, pp. 87–99) – The beginning of this era, with the expected prominence given to Jean-François Champollion, who knew how to anticipate the efforts of several competitors (Thomas Young, Johan David Åkerblad and Silvestre de Sacy). Big names in the post-Champollionic phase are those of Karl Richard Lepsius, founder of German Egyptology, John Gardner Wilkinson, the "Father of British Egyptology", and Émile Prisse d'Avennes, who sent a number of Egyptian antiquities to France.
- Chapter VI: "Archaeologists to the Rescue" (Les archéologues au secours de l'Égypte, pp. 101–111) – After several decades of unbridled looting, of destruction of monuments, of contempt for the meticulous recording of the finds, came the archaeologists to rescue Egypt. Among them are: Auguste Mariette, who would eventually die in Egypt occupying the high position of Director of Antiquities; Gaston Maspero, Mariette's successor and Heinrich Karl Brugsch, who was associated with Mariette in his excavations at Memphis.
- Chapter VII: "The Rediscovery of Ancient Egypt" (L'Égypte retrouvée, pp. 113–127) – This chapter evokes the works of Howard Carter in the Valley of the Kings (tomb of Tutankhamun), and Pierre Montet's excavations at Tanis (tombs of Psusennes I, Amenemope, Shoshenq II ...), it's already in the first half of 20^{th} century. If the discoveries of the tombs of Tutankhamun and Psusennes had the international exposure, the truth is that almost every year new findings have been brought to light, many of which are only in the knowledge of the teams of work, of scholars and readers of specialised Egyptology journals. At a good pace, the discoveries continue today, methodically exploring the archaeological sites that exist not only in Egypt but also in Nubia; so "the philologists, epigraphers, and historians were all kept busy examining newly unearthed documentary material", and "Egyptology had left its infancy behind and was now maturing into adulthood".^{:127}
- Gatefold following page (p. 128), of panoramic view:
  - Philae, watercolour by Sir John Gardner Wilkinson
  - Map of Egypt by Dominique Thibault
  - Philae, watercolour by Sir John Gardner Wilkinson

=== Documents ===
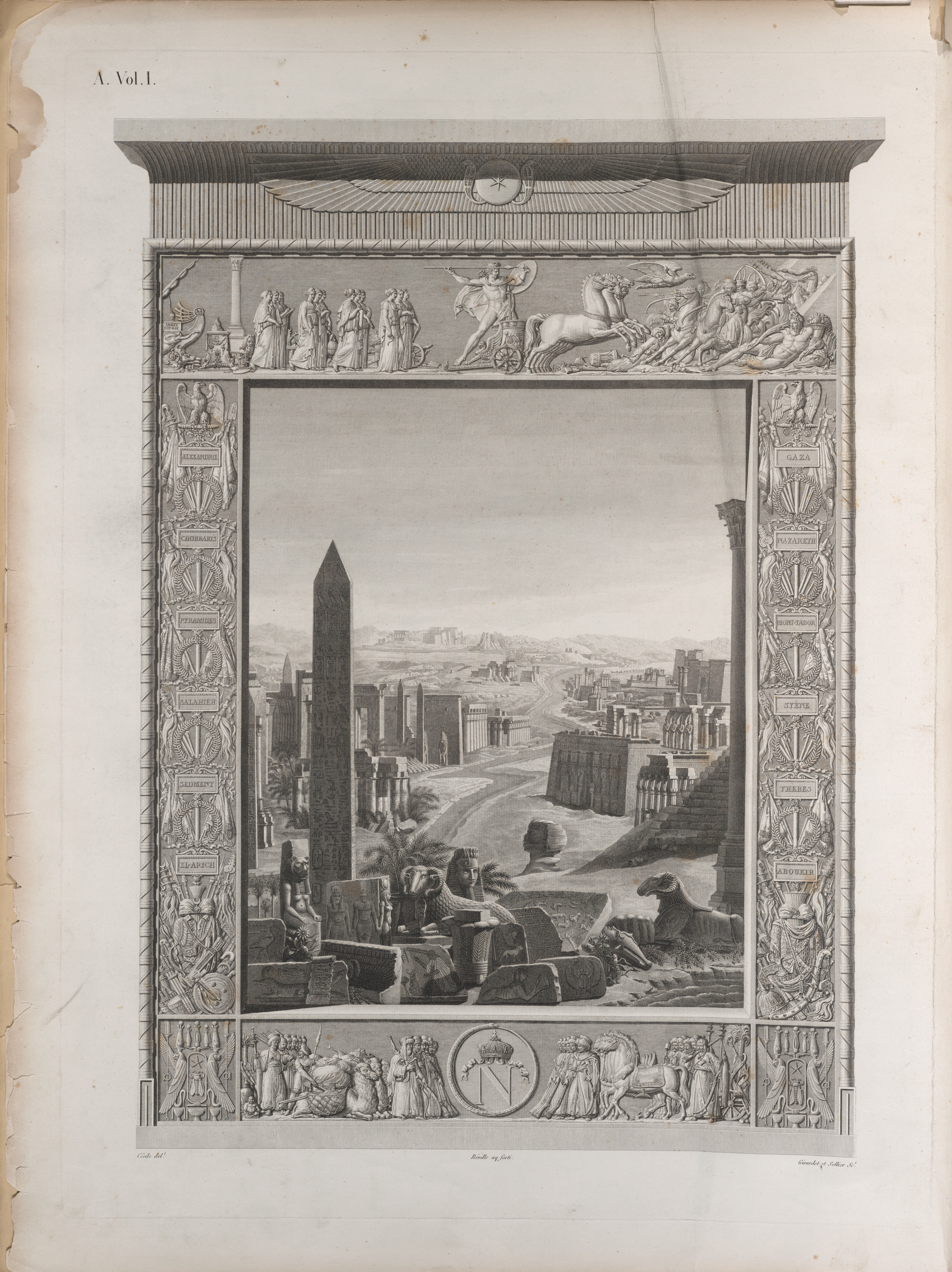
The frontispiece of the Description de l'Égypte (vol. 1), reproduced on p. 139.

Unlike the body text in colour, the second part of the book—the "Documents" (Témoignages et documents, pp. 129–195)—is printed in black and white, functioning as an anthology of excerpts divided into 19 parts (16 in English edition), taken from texts by Jean Tulard on Napoléon's expedition in Egypt, Chateaubriand (Itinéraire de Paris à Jérusalem), Flaubert (Voyage en Orient), Maxime Du Camp (Souvenirs littéraires), Fromentin (Voyage en Égypte), Mark Twain (The Innocents Abroad), Pierre Loti (La Mort de Philæ), Mariette (Le Sérapéum de Memphis).

Besides these big names, there are texts by modern Egyptologists such as Claude Traunecker, Vercoutter himself on the rescue of Abu Simbel temples and Jean-Claude Golvin (about the restoration works at Karnak), among others. The rest recount the transport of Egyptian obelisks to Europe, the inauguration of the Suez Canal, the mummy of Ramesses II under attack by fungi, the renewed attempts to discover the secret of the Great Pyramid, the main works of art of the Egyptian collection at Louvre Museum, etc. The document Les mystères des pyramides also includes references to comic books where Egypt is the theme (Asterix, Tintin and Blake and Mortimer).

The book closes with a complete chronology of Ancient Egyptian history (from 6000 BC to 639 AD), further reading, list of illustrations and an index.

- Documents (pp. 129–195) and Appendices (pp. 196–207)

| First French edition | English edition |
|---|---|
| 1, La campagne d'Égypte (pp. 130–137) | 1, The Egyptian Campaign (pp. 130–137) |
| 2, La Description de l'Égypte (pp. 138–141) | 2, The Description of Egypt (pp. 138–141) |
| 3, Le style « retour d'Égypte » (pp. 142–143) | 3, The Egyptian Revival Style (pp. 142–143) |
| 4, Le long voyage des obélisques (pp. 144–149) | 4, The Obelisk's Long Journey (pp. 144–149) |
| 5, L'inauguration du Canal de Suez (pp. 150–151) | 5, The Inauguration of the Suez Canal (pp. 150–151) |
| 6, Le voyage en Orient (pp. 152–157) | – |
| – | 6, The Father of Modern Egyptology (about Flinders Petrie; English edition exclusive, pp. 152–155) |
| 7, Des Américains à l'assaut des pyramides (pp. 158–159) | 7, The American Assault on the Pyramids (pp. 156–157) |
| 8, Un officier de marine à Philæ (pp. 160–161) | – |
| – | 8, The Greatest Excavator of his Day (about George Andrew Reisner; English edition exclusive, pp. 158–159) |
| 9, Le Sérapéum de Memphis (pp. 162–165) | 9, The Serapeum at Memphis (pp. 160–163) |
| 10, La résurrection de Karnak (pp. 166–171) | 10, The Resurrection of Karnak (pp. 164–169) |
| 11, La renaissance de Philæ (pp. 172–173) | 11, The Rebirth of Philae (pp. 170–171) |
| 12, Le sauvetage d'Abou Simbel (pp. 174–181) | 12, The Rescue of Abu Simbel (pp. 172–179) |
| 13, Histoires de pillages... (pp. 182–185) | 13, Stories of Pillaging (pp. 180–183) |
| 14, L'Égyptologie aujourd'hui (pp. 186–187) | 14, Egyptology Today (pp. 184–185) |
| 15, La journée d'un archéologue (pp. 188–189) | – |
| 16, La nouvelle vie de Ramsès II (pp. 190–193) | 15, A New Lease on Life for Ramses II (pp. 186–189) |
| 17, Les mystères des pyramides (pp. 194–199) | – |
| 18, Sur la piste de Chéops (pp. 200–205) | 16, In Search of Cheops (pp. 190–195) |
| 19, L'Égypte au musée du Louvre (pp. 206–213) | – |
| Les grandes divisions chronologiques de l'histoire de l'Égypte (pp. 214–216) | Chronology (pp. 196–198) |
| – | Further Reading (pp. 199–201) |
| Table des illustrations (pp. 217–220) | List of Illustrations (pp. 201–204) |
| Index (pp. 221–222) | Index (pp. 205–207) |
| Remerciements/Crédits photographiques (p. 223) | Acknowledgments/Photograph Credits (p. 207) |
| Table des matières (p. 224) | Contents (p. 10) |

== Reception ==
On Babelio, the book has an average of 3.58/5 based on 25 ratings. Goodreads reported, based on 124 ratings, an average of 3.81 out of 5, indicating "generally positive opinions".

In his book review for the academic journal Cadmo (No. 3) of the Oriental Institute of the University of Lisbon, the Portuguese Egyptologist Luís Manuel de Araújo praised the selection of illustrations for the book: "A well-designed book, with excellent text and a wealth of beautiful illustrations [...] This beautiful volume is valued by the excellent selection of images that lavishly accompanies the text, some of the illustrations belong to classic works from the early days of Egyptology, such as the Description de l'Égypte, Lepsius's Denkmäler aus Ägypten und Äthiopien, David Roberts's Egypt and Nubia, among others." De Araújo also notes the erroneous spelling for the divine name by using Khourou instead of Khonsou (in English: Khonsu) when mentioning the temple of this lunar deity at Karnak (p. 210); the name of the pharaoh of the 12^{th} dynasty—Amenemhat I—is wrongly written Amenhemat (p. 214); the name of Horus Kaa—last king of the First Dynasty—reduced to Ka (p. 214), due to failure of revision; and a reference to Seti I in a caption while the pharaoh represented in the illustration is Ramesses II (p. 92, corrected in English edition); as well as the inexplicable absence of the famous English Egyptologist Flinders Petrie, who introduced new methods of prospecting and registering the findings in archaeological research; and his contemporaries Adolf Erman and George Andrew Reisner also being omitted.

In the academic journal História: Questões & Debates of the Federal University of Paraná, Johnni Langer wrote in his review article Os mistérios do Egito antigo: "The recently released Em busca do Egito esquecido (Brazilian edition of The Search for Ancient Egypt) is a fact to celebrate. Both for the prodigious knowledge of the author Jean Vercoutter and for the graphic quality of the book. [...] Much more than the textual content, the greatest importance of the book in question is its graphic structure, a true delight of extremely important works for historians interested in deepening the imagery of archaeology. It is through the images that we can see the real strength, the real symbolic potential of Egypt for Europeans. No civilisation has succeeded in bringing together so many sensations, such differences in visual perceptions and the symbolic content of material culture. [...] One of the only weaknesses of the book is that it included few images of the Scottish painter David Roberts, the most important painter of archaeological themes of the 19^{th} century. [...] In any case, Vercoutter's book also contains material that is not widely distributed, such as the marvellous watercolours by Nestor L'Hôte, who accompanied Champollion on his trip to Egypt. The little-known Philæ (1845), currently in the Louvre Museum, is doubly important: it gives us the impression of representing the expedition camp, in addition to representing in strong and vibrant tones the original colours of the famous temple of Isis."

The Russian Egyptologist Victor Solkin wrote in his review: "The book is laconic, replete with interesting facts and wonderful illustrations, sometimes very rare images. [...] In general, we have before us a miniature guide to the history of Egyptian archaeology, which will present the whole panorama of the cultural interaction between the country of the pyramids and Europe to the reader who is not familiar with Egypt."

== See also ==
- In the 'Découvertes Gallimard' collection:
  - Mummies: A Voyage Through Eternity by Françoise Dunand
  - Coptic Egypt: The Christians of the Nile by Christian Cannuyer
  - The Pyramids of Giza: Facts, Legends and Mysteries by Jean-Pierre Corteggiani
  - Champollion : Un scribe pour l'Égypte by Michel Dewachter
