= Mummies: A Voyage Through Eternity =

1991 book by Françoise Dunand and Roger Lichtenberg

- First French edition. The cover featuring a Fayum mummy portrait.
- Author: Françoise Dunand; Roger Lichtenberg
- Original title: Les Momies : Un voyage dans l'éternité
- Translator: Ruth Sharman
- Cover artist: Anonymous (FR & US eds.); Anonymous. Ramesses II in his wooden coffin, photograph; detail from the Hildesheim sarcophagus. (UK ed.)
- Language: French
- Series: Découvertes Gallimard●Archéologie (FR); Abrams Discoveries (US); New Horizons (UK)
- Release number: 118th in collection
- Subject: Egyptian mummies, Ancient Egyptian funerary practices
- Genre: Nonfiction monograph
- Publisher: Éditions Gallimard (FR); Harry N. Abrams (US); Thames & Hudson (UK)
- Publication date: 26 September 1991; 26 October 2007 (new ed.)
- Publication place: France
- English publication date: 1994
- Media type: Print (paperback)
- Pages: 128 (first edition); 144 (new edition); 128 (UK & US editions)
- ISBN: 978-2-0705-3167-7 (first edition)
- OCLC: 470547459
- Preceded by: L'Afrique des explorateurs : Vers les sources du Nil
- Followed by: Jules Verne : Le rêve du progrès

Mummies: A Voyage Through Eternity (UK title: Mummies: A Journey Through Eternity; French: Les Momies : Un voyage dans l'éternité) is a 1991 illustrated monograph on the Egyptian mummies, ancient Egyptian funerary practices and the history of the discoveries of Egyptian mummies. Co-written by the French historian Françoise Dunand and the medical doctor Roger Lichtenberg, and published in pocket format by Éditions Gallimard as the 118th volume in the "Découvertes Gallimard" collection (known as "Abrams Discoveries" in the United States, and "New Horizons" in the United Kingdom).

== Synopsis ==
From left: US and UK editions.

Since Herodotus, the ancient travelers had been struck by this strange country, which "is nothing like the others", and the ancient Egyptians preserved the dead body in as lifelike a manner as possible. Thanks to the testimonies of the Arabs, the West has always known that ancient Egypt was a country of mummies. Today, we know most of the processes of mummification, desiccation of bodies obtained through the dry climate of Egypt, the removal of viscera, the use of natron and bandages. Similarly, we know what kind of rituals accompanied the preparation of the corpse, who were responsible for the mummification process. As for why the mummification, it is related to the Egyptian religion, for which it is the guarantee of immortality, the possibility of a new life—life after death.

== Introduction ==
Based on recent radiographic and genetic analyses of bodies, Françoise Dunand and Roger Lichtenberg take stock of the historical knowledge of mummies, and add a scientific dimension in this small book, published in the Archéologie series of Gallimard's "Découvertes" collection.

According to the tradition of "Découvertes", which is based on an abundant pictorial documentation and a way of bringing together visual documents and texts, enhanced by printing on coated paper, as commented in L'Express, "genuine monographs, published like art books". The book is almost like a "graphic novel", richly documented with more than 200 illustrations—drawings, paintings, sculptures, X-ray photographs of mummies, etc.—, which illustrate the body copy as the pages are pretty equally shared between images and texts.

The book is an archaeological and anthropological study on Egyptian mummification and funeral practices in ancient Egypt, a practice that the Egyptians developed at the start of the Old Kingdom, which lasted until under Roman Egypt (Fayum mummy portraits), and even under Christian Egypt of the first centuries.

It opens with full-page head shots of nine mummies from the necropolis at Duch excavated by Dunand's IFAO team. Photographs of the excavation at the Duch necropolis are also some of the book's highlights. The authors approach the subject from different angles: the discoveries of mummies by the Western world (chap. I, "Mummies Come to Light"), such as the writings of Herodotus and curiosity of Egyptomania in the 19th century, up to the scientific research of the 20th century with the contribution of radiology techniques (chap. V, "Under Expert Analysis"). The second chapter—"Making a Better Mummy"—deals with how the ancient Egyptians mummified a body, while the third chapter, "Toward Immortality", illustrated with ancient paintings explaining the rites and beliefs. Chapter IV, "From Eternal Life to Harsh Reality" tells the valuable offerings which the ancient Egyptians furnished with their dead, and the direct consequence of this: the pillaging of tombs. In the last chapter (chap. V), the scientists give anthropological results.

In its second part—the "Documents" section—the book provides a compilation of excerpts taken from some ancient documents and texts by 19th-century investigators, which is divided into five parts: 1, Funeral Rites; 2, Mummification According to Herodotus; 3, An Unpeaceful End; 4, Two Sensational Discoveries; 5, Looking into Mummies. The book closes with a chronology, map, further reading, list of illustrations and an index. It has been translated into Dutch (Belgium & the Netherlands), English (UK & US), Italian, Japanese, Russian, South Korean, Spanish, Swedish and traditional Chinese (Taiwan).

== Reception ==
On Babelio, the book has an average of 3.18/5 based on 14 ratings. Goodreads reported, based on 23 ratings, the US edition gets an average of 3.91 out of 5, and the UK edition 3.75/5 based on 12 ratings, indicating "generally positive opinions".

In his book review for the journal Dialogues d'histoire ancienne (1992), the French historian Georges Tate wrote: "In five dense, clear and sumptuously illustrated chapters, the authors present a document on the subject based on the most recent discoveries that cover all the questions one can ask about mummies. [...] A sumptuous work where the interest of the text never weakens thanks to a lively and clear writing and an illustration remarkable for its quality and for the support and sometimes the extensions that it brings to the text."

The Russian Egyptologist Victor Solkin wrote in his review: "The world of mummies, funeral masks and amulets, commemorative texts and grandiose tombs has become one of the 'calling cards' of ancient Egypt in the eyes of our contemporaries. It would seem that a lot has been written on this subject; however, it is very rare to find a publication which, in simple and accessible language, would explain the essence of such a complex and, at the same time, so fascinating phenomenon. In this context, the book by F. Dunand and R. Lichtenberg, small, but informative and beautifully illustrated, would become a real find for the Russian-speaking reader, especially considering that in addition to interesting information, its pages contain images of truly rare monuments and unique historical images. Everything would be fine, but the Russian edition of the book turned out to be in part incorrect 'thanks' to the translator's work. [...] The original book is good for the mass of specific details, names, which allows the reader to better understand the material, to make comparisons, to find analogies in other books. [...] It is a very worthy book written for anyone interested in Egypt by two well-known experts. Their text is accompanied by excellent illustrations, very well reproduced in the Russian version. [...] The book is definitely worth buying, despite all the translation errors. For some reason, the British were able to do a high quality translation of a French book. Why are we worse?"

== See also ==
- In the 'Découvertes Gallimard' collection:
  - The Search for Ancient Egypt by Jean Vercoutter
  - Coptic Egypt: The Christians of the Nile by Christian Cannuyer
  - The Pyramids of Giza: Facts, Legends and Mysteries by Jean-Pierre Corteggiani
  - Champollion : Un scribe pour l'Égypte by Michel Dewachter
