= Coptic Egypt: The Christians of the Nile =

2000 book by Christian Cannuyer

- First French edition. The cover featuring 'head of a dancer', wool textile, 4th–5th century, Louvre Museum, Paris.
- Author: Christian Cannuyer
- Original title: L'Égypte copte, les chrétiens du Nil
- Translator: Sophie Hawkes
- Cover artist: Anonymous
- Language: French
- Series: Découvertes Gallimard●Religions (FR); New Horizons (UK); Abrams Discoveries (US)
- Release number: 395th in collection
- Subject: Copts; Coptic Egypt; Coptic history; Coptic Christianity
- Genre: Nonfiction monograph
- Publisher: Éditions Gallimard (FR); Thames & Hudson (UK); Harry N. Abrams (US)
- Publication date: 4 May 2000
- Publication place: France
- English publication date: 2001
- Media type: Print (paperback)
- Pages: 144 pp
- ISBN: 978-2-0705-3512-5 (first edition)
- OCLC: 718106636
- Preceded by: Berlin enfin !
- Followed by: Venise : La Sérénissime et la mer

Coptic Egypt: The Christians of the Nile (French: L'Égypte copte, les chrétiens du Nil) is a 2000 illustrated monograph on Copts and Christian Egypt. Written by the Belgian historian of religion Christian Cannuyer, and published in pocket format by Éditions Gallimard as the 395th volume in their 'Découvertes' collection, in collaboration with the Institut du monde arabe.

== Introduction ==
From left: US and UK editions.

The book is part of the Religions series in the 'Découvertes Gallimard' collection. According to the tradition of 'Découvertes', which is based on an abundant pictorial documentation and a way of bringing together visual documents and texts, enhanced by printing on coated paper, as commented in L'Express, 'genuine monographs, published like art books'. It's almost like a 'graphic novel', replete with colour plates.

The English-language edition entitled Coptic Egypt: The Christians of the Nile, came out in 2001. This book has only been translated into English.

== Contents ==
Christian Cannuyer traces in five chapters the early history, the rich artistic and spiritual heritage of the Egyptian Christians known as Copts in this densely illustrated volume, along with other topics, such as Coptic Christology, Coptic art and Christian conversions to Islam. The book starts with 'The First Church of Alexandria' (chap. I), from Roman times (chap. II, 'When Egypt was Christian'), Islamic Egypt (chap. III, 'Under the Sign of the Crescent'), Turkish conquest and the rediscovery of Coptic Christians by the West (chap. IV, 'Crossing the Desert'), up to modern era (chap. V, 'The Copts in the Modern Era'). The author also gives a brief explanation of the influence of ancient Egyptian culture and religion on the Copts.

The second part of the book, the 'Documents', containing a compilation of excerpts divided into five parts: 1, Origins of the Egyptian church; 2, The Desert Fathers; 3, The echoes of ancient Egypt; 4, On earth as it is in heaven; 5, The Copts as seen by the West. They are followed by a map of Coptic Egypt, a list of further reading, list of illustrations and an index.

== Synopsis ==
In ancient Egypt, religion was an omnipresent phenomenon. The Romans occupied the country at about the time when Christianity was born, an extraordinary phenomenon then took place: little by little, Christ replaced the Egyptian god Osiris, and all the more easily as the Gospels report the almost four-year stay of the Holy Family in the Nile Valley. Alexandria, the great Mediterranean city, was the home to the first Christians in Egypt. According to the tradition, the Church was born here with Saint Mark the Evangelist, which later became part of the Eastern Christian Empire. Egypt even adopted Christianity as its state religion in the 4th century. Egypt at that time—especially Alexandria—was a real crossroads where the ancient culture of the Pharaohs, the Greek and Roman cultures, Judaic and Gnostic currents have had a strong influence on the young Christian communities.

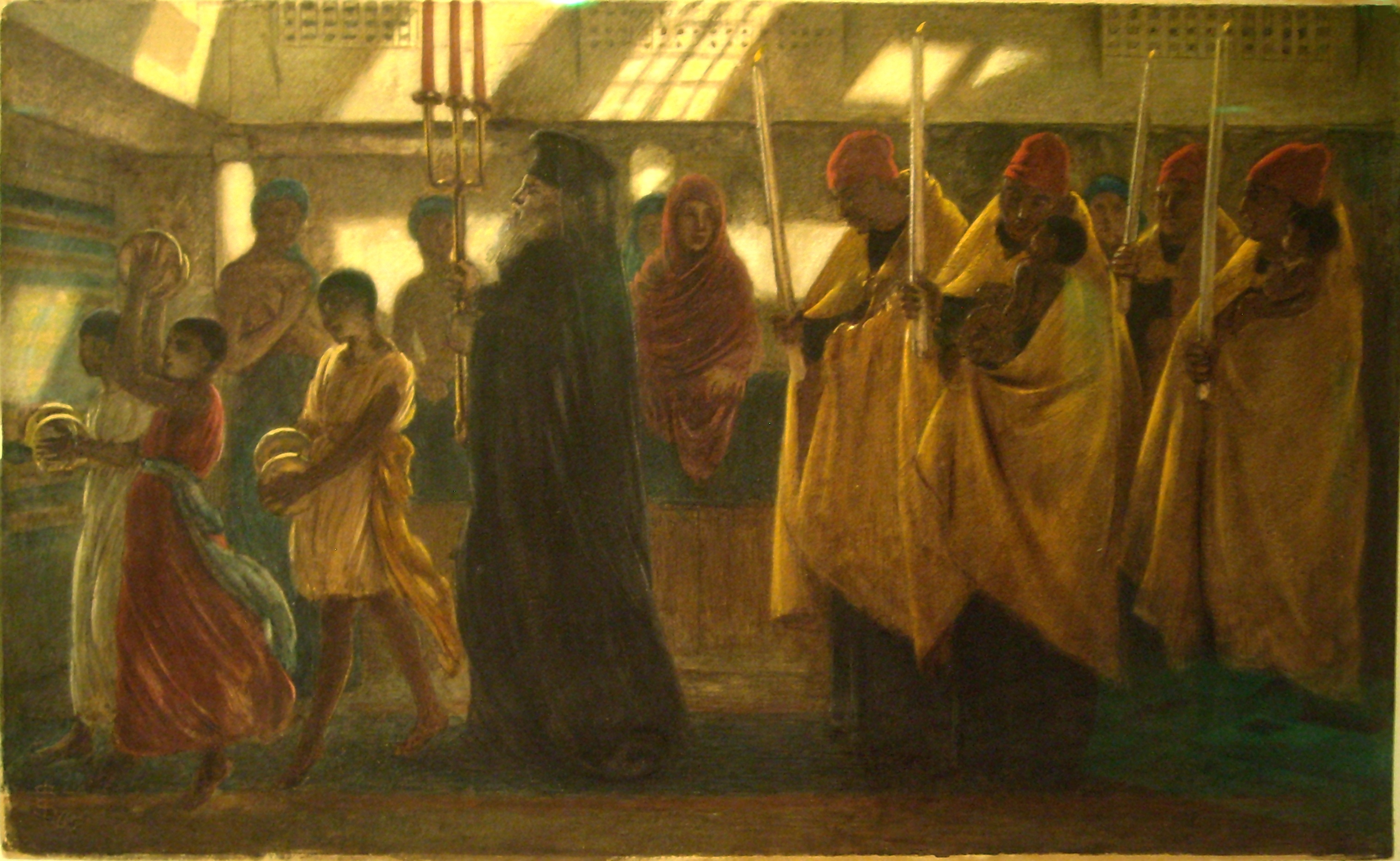
Coptic Baptismal Procession by English Pre-Raphaelite painter Simeon Solomon, 1865. Watercolour reproduced on pp. 98–99 as a double-page spread illustration.

The Copts today still use in their liturgy the Coptic language, derived from the ancient Egyptian, to pray in churches and monasteries founded in the 4th century by the Desert Fathers—Anthony, Pachomius, Paul of Thebes—and gather at festivals and pilgrimages dedicated to the Lord, the Mother of God, the saints and the martyrs. Cannuyer explains the definition of the name Copt in his book:

The Copts are the Christians of Egypt. Theirs is among the most ancient forms of Christianity, born in the time of Jesus. The name derives from the Arabic Qibṭ, an abbreviation of the Greek name Aigýptios (Egyptian); this in turn is a derivation of Hikuptah, House of the Energy of Ptah, the religious name for Memphis, the capital city of ancient Egypt. Coptic Christianity mingles remnants of pharaonic practices, elements of Hellenistic and Byzantine Egyptian culture, and the dynamism of Arab civilization.

== Reception ==
On Babelio, the book has an average of 4.0/5 based on 4 ratings.

In the Anglican newspaper Church Times, the review says: 'From the book, a glossy paperback crammed with facts and pictures.'

The Cairene broadsheet Al-Ahram Weekly gave the book a positive review: 'A small informative, well-researched and beautiful publication that conveys the richness and diversity of the Coptic heritage.'

Danièle Gillemon and Christian Laporte of Le Soir wrote that the book 'leaves nothing in the shadow of Christian Egypt. [...] For he [Christian Cannuyer] is fundamentally a linguist, Coptic remains an inexhaustible fount of knowledge and documentation. So it is not only addressed to students of Egyptology but to historians of early Christianity and to those of gnosis. His book is a model of the genre, a genre which, it must be said, already has a lot of interesting titles. Popularisation? Yes, but made by a specialist. [...] [Compared with the Coptic Encyclopedia], neophytes will undoubtedly prefer the excellent and very handy "Découvertes Gallimard".'

== Religious travels ==
In collaboration with The World of the Bible and La Croix, religious travels under the theme of L'Égypte copte, les chrétiens du Nil are organised by the travel agency Routes Bibliques, accompanied by Christian Cannuyer, to discovering Coptic history and its artistic and spiritual heritage.

== See also ==
- Coptology
- Coptic monasticism
- In the 'Découvertes Gallimard' collection:
  - The Search for Ancient Egypt by Jean Vercoutter
  - Mummies: A Voyage Through Eternity by Françoise Dunand
  - The Pyramids of Giza: Facts, Legends and Mysteries by Jean-Pierre Corteggiani
  - Champollion : Un scribe pour l'Égypte by Michel Dewachter
