= The Pyramids of Giza: Facts, Legends and Mysteries =

2006 book by Jean-Pierre Corteggiani

- The cover featuring an aerial view of the pyramids of Khafre and Khufu.
- Author: Jean-Pierre Corteggiani
- Original title: Les Grandes Pyramides : Chronique d'un mythe
- Translator: Ruth Sharman
- Language: French
- Series: Découvertes Gallimard●Archéologie (FR); Abrams Discoveries (US); New Horizons (UK)
- Release number: 501st in collection
- Subject: Three Pyramids of Giza
- Genre: Nonfiction monograph
- Publisher: Éditions Gallimard (FR); Harry N. Abrams (US); Thames & Hudson (UK)
- Publication date: 9 November 2006
- Publication place: France
- English publication date: 2007
- Media type: Print (paperback)
- Pages: 128 pp
- ISBN: 978-2-0703-3941-9 (first edition)
- OCLC: 192043692
- Preceded by: Art brut : L'instinct créateur
- Followed by: Le Centre Pompidou : Les années Beaubourg

The Pyramids of Giza: Facts, Legends and Mysteries (US title: The Great Pyramids; French: Les Grandes Pyramides : Chronique d'un mythe, lit. 'The Great Pyramids: Chronicle of a Myth') is a 2006 illustrated monograph by French Egyptologist Jean-Pierre Corteggiani. The book was published on the occasion of the 20th anniversary of 'Découvertes Gallimard', together with Néron : Le mal-aimé de l'Histoire, L'affaire Qumrân : Les découvertes de la mer Morte and a new edition of À la recherche de l'Égypte oubliée.

== Synopsis ==
Drawing on archives throughout history and scientific inspection, Corteggiani illustrates the myth and reality in a historical chronicle of the three Great Pyramids of Giza, which are the only one of the Seven Wonders of the Ancient World that still stands today. These gigantic, time-defying tombs, erected more than 4500 years ago, have never ceased to arouse great admiration and the wildest speculations. Their popularity is evident in classical texts, Arab legends and accounts of Western travellers.

In addition to the central enigma, the question of how the pyramids were built, the author guides readers through historical theories, sketches and excavations, including the pseudoscientific theory of pyramidology, and research carried out by amateur Egyptologists Gilles Dormion and Jean-Yves Verd'hurt in a previously unknown chamber of the Great Pyramid.

== Contents ==
Body text

- Opening: a succession of full-page old photographs (pp. 1–7)
- Chapter 1: 'From Herodotus to Napoleon' (pp. 11–27)
- Chapter 2: 'Soldiers, Pioneers and Adventurers' (pp. 29–45)
- Chapter 3: 'The Scientific Era' (pp. 47–65)
- Chapter 4: 'The Cemetery Complex' (pp. 67–83)
- Chapter 5: 'Theses, Hypotheses and Realities' (pp. 85–95)

Documents

1. The Pyramids Seen by the Ancients (pp. 98–102)
2. An Arabic Perspective (pp. 103–104)
3. Travellers from the West (pp. 105–110)
4. The Age of Discovery (pp. 111–115)
5. Khufu's Chamber (pp. 116–119)
- Chronology of the Pyramids (pp. 120–121)
- List of Illustrations (pp. 122–125)
- Index (pp. 125–127)
- Picture Credits/Acknowledgments (p. 127)

== Reception ==
The historian Maurice Sartre wrote for Le Monde, 'Jean-Pierre Corteggiani recounts the discovery of the pyramids from Ancient Greeks to Napoleon with science and humour'.

In his review for the academic journal Cadmo (No. 18) of the Oriental Institute of the University of Lisbon, Pedro de Abreu Malheiro thinks that 'the book proves to be particularly useful for all those who wish to obtain a comprehensive and accessible view of the Pyramids of Giza. However, as it is a work of popularisation, it does not replace works of deeper and more thorough research, such as those by J.-P. Lauer, I. E. S. Edwards, R. Stadelmann and M. Lehner, so it could be a perfect supplement'.

In the British Egyptology magazine Ancient Egypt, the review says: 'This is a very small book, with just 128 pages, but crammed with information (using a small type font) and with many illustrations. Books on the pyramids are all too common, but this volume provides a sensible overview of the Giza pyramids, the history of their exploration and the various theories and hypotheses that have grown up around them, and compares these theories with the realities and recent archaeological discoveries.'

In the British travel magazine Wanderlust, the review says: 'One of the best little guides we have seen to the only Ancient Wonder still standing.'

== See also ==
- Egyptian pyramids
- Pyramid of Khafre
- Pyramid of Menkaure
- Orion correlation theory
- Egyptian pyramid construction techniques
- In the 'Découvertes Gallimard' collection:
  - The Search for Ancient Egypt by Jean Vercoutter
  - Coptic Egypt: The Christians of the Nile by Christian Cannuyer
  - Mummies: A Voyage Through Eternity by Françoise Dunand
  - Champollion : Un scribe pour l'Égypte by Michel Dewachter
