= Chirography (disambiguation) =

Chirography (from Greek χείρ, hand) is the study of writing by hand in all of its aspects.

Chirography may also refer to:

- Penmanship, the technique of writing with the hand and a writing instrument
- Calligraphy, the art of fancy lettering, the art of giving form to signs in an expressive, harmonious and skillful manner
- Handwriting, a person's particular style of writing by pen or a pencil

== See also ==
This word was used erroneously in Cockeram, etc., for Chorography.
