= Writing: The Story of Alphabets and Scripts =

1987 book by Georges Jean

- First French edition. Centre: traditional Chinese character for "brush" by Ru Xiaofan, 20th century; counterclockwise from bottom left: The Book Peddler, 16th-century wood engraving, Musée Carnavalet, Paris; detail of a plate entitled L'Art d'écrire, from the Encyclopédie, 1763; cover of a Kufic Koran from the Maghreb, photograph; hieroglyphic cartouche in Voyage en Égypte, Jean-François Champollion.
- Author: Georges Jean
- Original title: L'écriture, mémoire des hommes
- Translator: Jenny Oates
- Language: French
- Series: Découvertes Gallimard●Archéologie (FR); Abrams Discoveries (US); New Horizons (UK)
- Release number: 24th in collection
- Subject: History of the alphabet and writing
- Genre: Nonfiction monograph
- Publisher: FR: Éditions Gallimard; US: Harry N. Abrams; UK: Thames & Hudson
- Publication date: 4 December 1987; 21 June 2007 (new ed.)
- Publication place: France
- English publication date: 1992
- Media type: Print (paperback)
- Pages: 224 (first edition); 160 (new edition in 2007); 208 (UK & US editions)
- ISBN: 978-2-0705-3040-3 (first edition)
- Preceded by: Montaigne : « Que sais-je ? »
- Followed by: Vers l'Ouest : Un nouveau monde

Writing: The Story of Alphabets and Scripts (French: L'écriture, mémoire des hommes, lit. 'Writing: Memory of Humans') is a 1987 illustrated monograph on the history of the alphabet and writing. Written by French linguist Georges Jean, and published by Éditions Gallimard as the 24th volume in their "Découvertes" collection. The book is one of the five bestsellers in the collection, together with The Search for Ancient Egypt.

== Synopsis ==
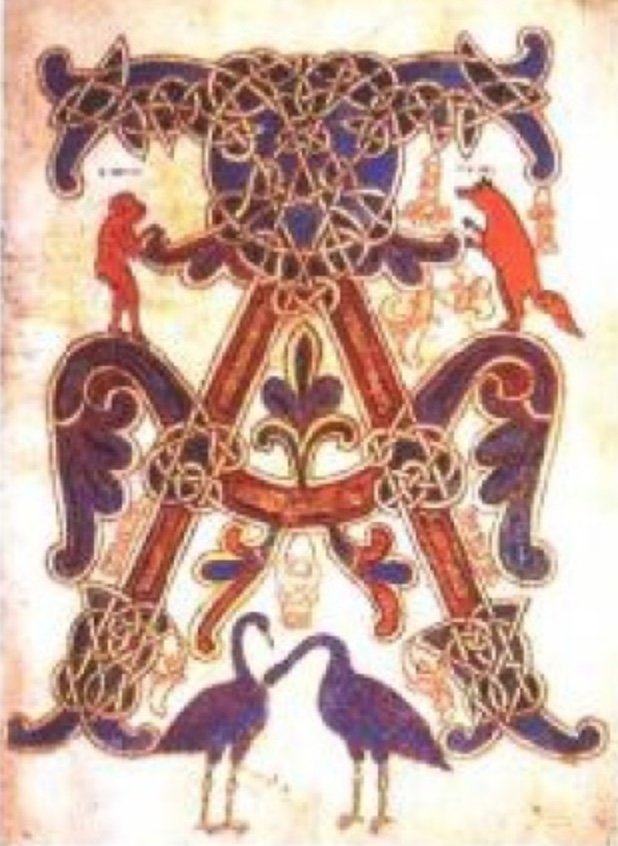
Title page illustration: illuminated capital from a 15th-century French manuscript. Bibl. Nat., Paris.

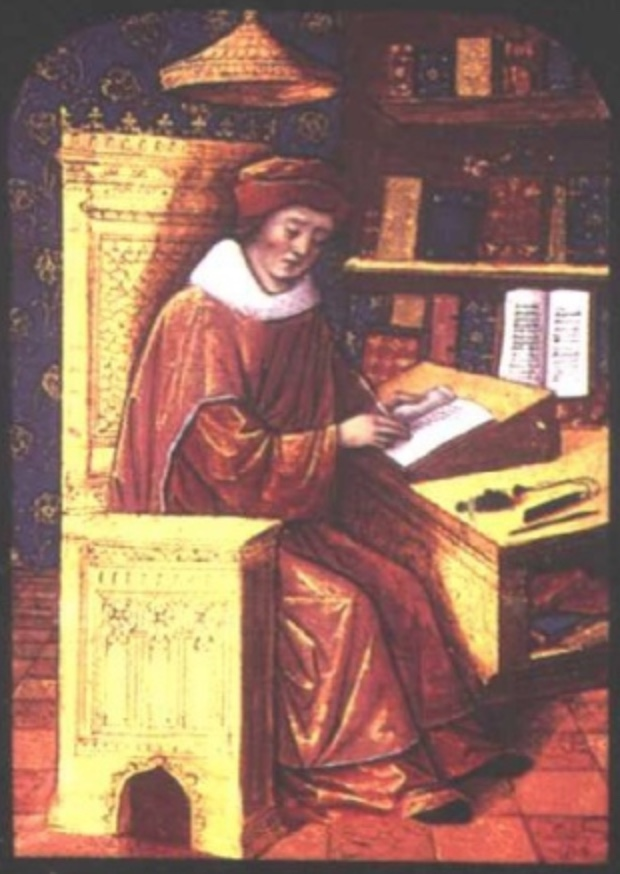
Back cover illustration: Jean Gerson writing. 15th-century French manuscript. Bibl. Nat., Paris.

Drawing on unearthed artefacts and historical documents, Georges Jean illustrates the history of writing from an archaeological perspective and with a diachronic approach. The author chose to organise Writing chronologically, stretching it from the cuneiform of Mesopotamia in 3200 BC, through the Phoenician alphabet around 1000 BC, to modern typographical techniques, with descriptions of how writing appeared almost simultaneously in ancient Mesopotamia, Egypt, and China. The author focuses on the introduction of Near Eastern and Western scripts, but also covers the characteristics and differences of some Far Eastern writing systems, Chinese, Indian and Tibetan, for instance.

The book details a variety of writing tools and media, such as clay tablets used by the Sumerians, reed pen and papyrus of the ancient Egyptians, Roman writing awls, quill and parchment of those medieval Irish monks, as well as brush, fountain pen, stone, paper, printing press, etc. It also discusses how these different writing methods and printing tools affect the development of written content, whether it can be circulated in large quantities, and the ways and channels for circulation.

== Contents ==
=== Body text ===
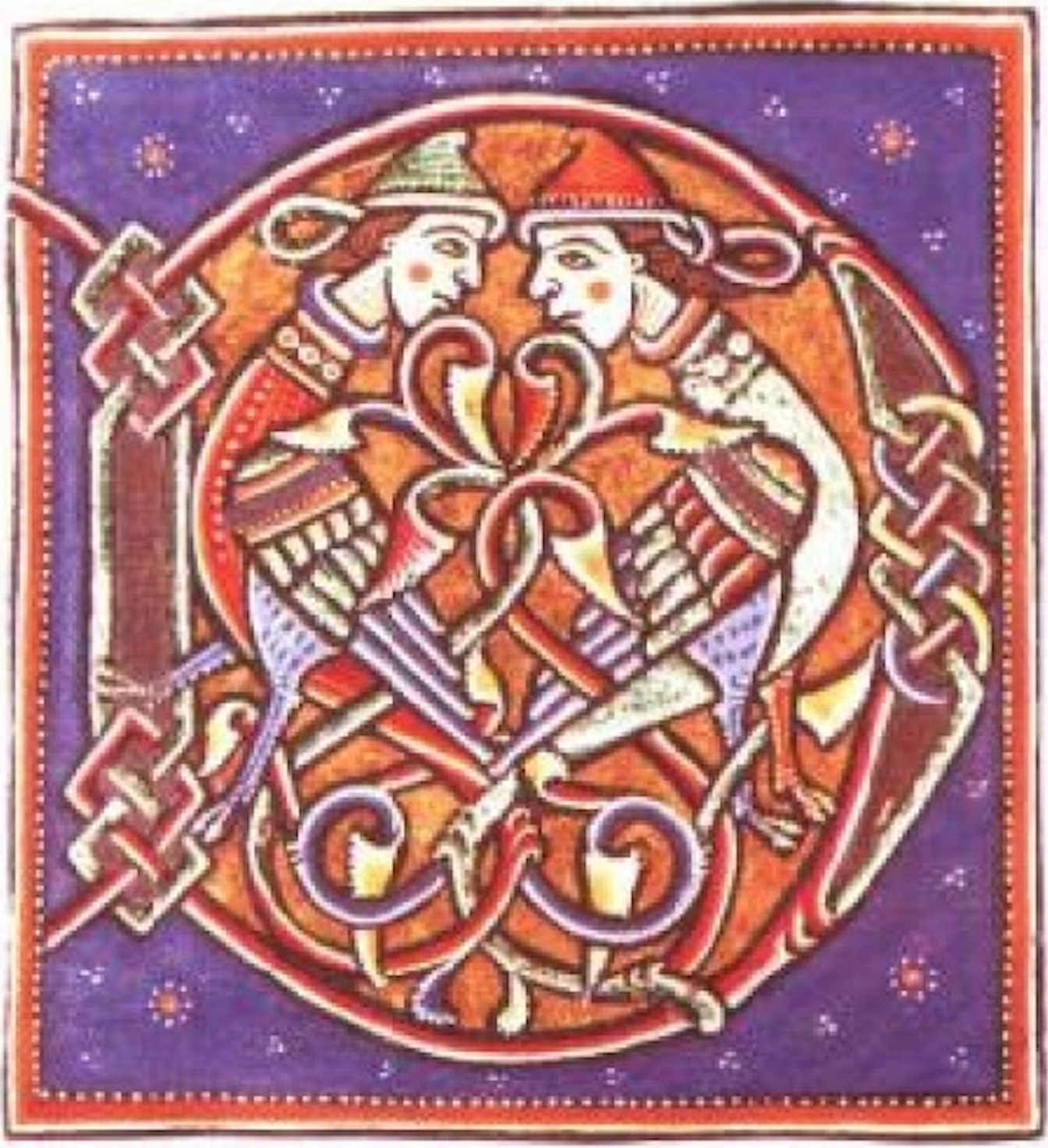
"In the Middle Ages a form of sacred writing became established in the monasteries. Beautifully designed and executed, it reflected the serenity of both those who created it and the setting in which they worked." Illuminated capital from a bible dating to the 12th or early 13th century. Coimbra, Portugal (G. Jean, Writing, p. 73).

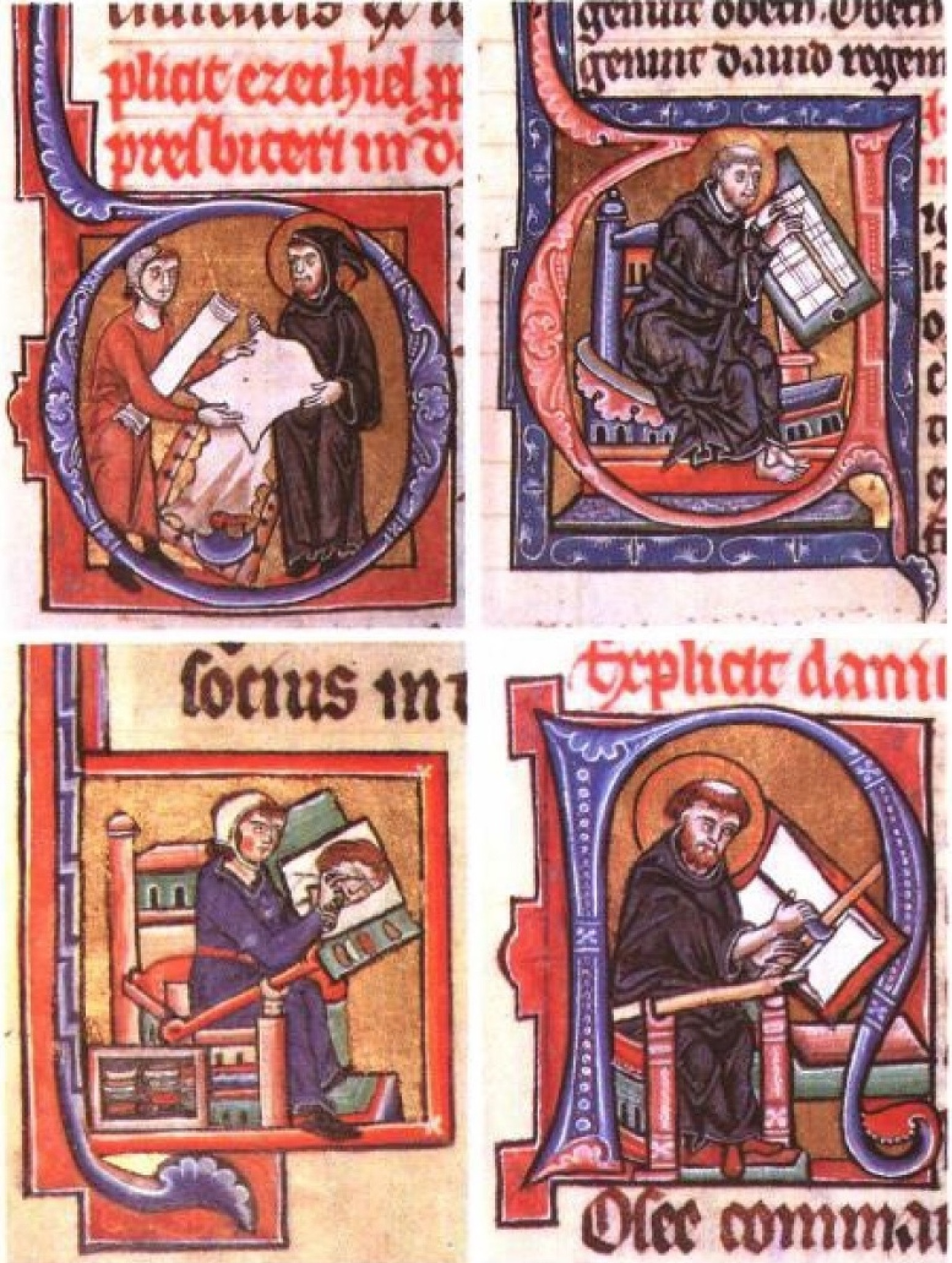
"The four stages in the making of a book: the delivery of the parchment to a monk; the marking of the lines by the scribe; the painting of a portrait; and the trimming of the sheets of vellum." Illuminated miniatures from German manuscripts, dating to the middle of the 13th century. Kongelige Bibliotek, Copenhagen (G. Jean, Writing, p. 86).

- "Trailer" (pré-générique, pp. 1–7): a succession of miniatures from the Chronicles of Jean Froissart, reproduced as full-page illustrations accompanied by captions.
- Chapter I: "Humble Beginnings" (Une humble naissance, pp. 11–23) deals with the emergence of writing, with cuneiforms, which occurred due to accounting needs.
- Chapter II: "Invention of the Gods" (Une invention des Dieux, pp. 25–49) deals with other ancient writing systems, such as those of Egypt and China, and highlights the fact that writing was considered by many peoples as a gift from the gods.
- Chapter III: "The Alphabet Revolution" (La révolution de l'alphabet, pp. 51–71) deals with Semitic writings, and how the creation of Greek, Latin and Etruscan scripts being inspired by the Phoenician alphabet.
- Chapter IV: "From Copyists to Printers" (Des copistes aux imprimeurs, pp. 73–95) deals with historical aspects outside the writing system itself in the Western world. With regard to the manuscripts, it deals with the importance of monks, scrolls, abbeys and monasteries. It discusses the role of calligraphers, illuminators, miniaturists, and bookbinders in the history of books. And it points out the gradual secularisation of writing.
- Chapter V: "The Bookmakers" (Les hommes du livre, pp. 97–115) deals with the history of the reproduction of written text, from copyists to the printing. The rise of the art of binding and pocket-sized books during the Renaissance era. The expansion of newspapers in the 18th century, thanks to the progress of printing technology, the first periodicals had appeared at the beginning of the 17th century in the Netherlands and in Germany.
- Chapter VI: "The Decipherers" (Les déchiffreurs, pp. 117–127) chronicles the deciphering of hieroglyphs, cuneiforms, and Linear B. The chapter ends with a discussion of "still undeciphered signs", such as Linear A and Phaistos Disc from Crete, and the mysterious Rongorongo of Easter Island.

=== Documents ===
The second part of this book is made up of an anthology of "Documents", which delves into more specialised texts and relevant authors on aspects of writing already covered in the body matter — the art of typography, digits and images, the tools for writing, calligraphy, the world's different writing systems, etc.

1. The Letter and the City (pp. 130–133)
2. The Implications of Writing (pp. 134–135)
3. The Typographer's Art (pp. 136–143)
4. Early Printing in Europe (pp. 144–145)
5. From Pen to Print (pp. 146–151)
6. Writing Music (pp. 152–157)
7. The Influence of Technique (pp. 158–161)
8. Calligraphy and Games with Letters (pp. 162–173)
9. The Art of Writing in China (pp. 174–187)
10. Alpha, Beta, and Others (pp. 188–198)
- Further Reading (p. 199)
- List of Illustrations (pp. 200–203)
- Index (pp. 204–207)
- Acknowledgments/Photograph Credits (p. 207)
