= Chirography =

Study of penmanship and handwriting in all of its aspects

Chirography (from Greek χείρ hand) is the study of penmanship and handwriting in all of its aspects.

== History ==
According to Georges Jean (1992, p. 12), standardised writing 'cannot be said to exist until there is an agreed upon repertoire of formal signs or symbols that can be used to reproduce clearly the thoughts and feelings' that those utilising them hope to put forth.

=== Ancient writing ===
Writing emerged around the 4th millennium BC, out of the necessity to keep accurate bureaucratic records. The Sumerians are regarded as the first everyday users (in agricultural applications) of pictographs (of which scholars have catalogued some 15,000 individual symbols).

=== Contextual handwriting/cuneiform ===
Contextual handwriting is said to have begun with the development of Cuneiform (from the Latin Cuneus and referring to the styluses used in creating the pictographs of the aforesaid). Cuneiform would be applied in the recording of the Akkadian language and several other languages of Mesopotamia as the usage of Sumerian began to fade as a spoken language.

=== Convergence in Mesopotamia and Egypt ===
As both Mesopotamians and Egyptians began to regard writing as an indicator of one's privilege/rank in societal hierarchy, instructors of the times were given rein to develop drilling (reading/identification, and so on) and memorisation techniques still in operation in modern language instruction. This may have also been assisted by the eventual availability of papyrus as well as the evolution of the hieroglyphs into the more comprehensible forms of Hieratic (from the Greek 'hieros' meaning 'sacred' and coined by Herodotus (c. 484-424 BCE)) and Demotic. These would diminish one another in their own swiftness and would be key elements in the deciphering of the Rosetta Stone by Jean-François Champollion.

=== Initial alphabets ===
While it is thought that the Phoenician alphabet is the first veritable alphabet, it contained only consonants (an abjad). Upon reaching the shores of Greece via sailing merchants, it is proposed that the Greek alphabet was developed by a combination of the Phoenician form and the Egyptian Demotic. Although it would fall out of common usage in or around 1100 BCE (except for, or almost exclusively in the university/scholarly realm, as well as in its mother country), its presence would be felt in more modern languages such as Latin and later English.

=== Aramaic and the worth of Biblical texts ===
As a great number of Biblical texts were transcribed in Aramaic (arising in Aram (modern day Syria) in or near 800 BCE), along with the rising popularity of the Gospels, teachings of both the language and theological aspects therein became more prevalent in society. This would be furthered by the eventual translations of the Aramaic into Hebrew and/or Yiddish which began to flourish in the Arabic peninsula and the surrounding areas along with the established language found in Qur'anic texts. And although there are spotty connections with their Phoenician systems, it is clear that the transcription of the 'scriptures' mentioned into dialects still spoken, to some degree, today allowed for written as well as verbal language to reach a larger portion of the masses.

=== Chinese language/East-Asian calligraphy/handwriting ===
The intricate system of characters defined by their radicals (214 in the Chinese system, with an alternative 79 radical system in the later developed Japanese interpretation known as Kanji (漢字)) is believed to have come to use around 2000 BCE. It was furthermore codified about 1500 BCE and finally systemised between 200 BCE-400 CE. It is considered one of the most consistently unchanged systems of writing and is held in high regard in its influence of nearby languages. Its forms, when written, may range from bloc (the most visible form generally not using brushes) to semi- and fully cursive styles which require a certain degree of skill and devotion (through constant practice and memorisation) and remain in wide use.

=== English/European development of script ===
In the words of Philip Hofer (1941, p. 2), in the latter portion of the 7th century 'English calligraphy became important and influential on the course of writing styles for the first time' (often credited in part to Alcuin of York). Eventually a form of English handwriting would form to follow the function of the daily business affairs of merchants, clerks and professional scribes for a more masterful and consistent means of correspondence.

During the same period (around the 17th-18th centuries), as English trade came more to the forefront of mainland Europe and the New World, a significant amount of copy books came about which made use of the finery of English script of the time. In some time a more common system of joined/cursive handwriting would be developed for usage in the same vein along with its promotion in the education system.

=== Some key figures of chirography ===
- Herodotus
- Qin Shi Huang(秦始皇)(260-210 BCE)
- Alcuin (735-804 CE)
- Johann Gutenberg (1398-1468 CE)
- Ludovico Arrighi (1475-1527 CE)
- Samuel Pepys (1633-1703 CE)
- Jean-François Champollion (1790-1832 CE)

== Modern chirography ==
Although, to a certain degree, modern widespread and efficient means of printing coupled with computer technology have pushed stylistic and complex handwriting techniques to the backdrop of linguistic aspects, the aforementioned practices remain in use often in the fields of academia for study. Calligraphy remains a commonplace facet of many modern East Asian languages as well as forms of cursive Arabic. However dated they may seem, they are necessary in order to grasp archaic or other older forms of current languages in the field of linguistics, as there are still mysteries to resolve (such as the near-indecipherable Indus script).

== See also ==
- Asemic writing
- Calligraphy
- Graphology
- Penmanship

== Sources ==
- Bickham, George and Philip Hofer (1941). The Universal Penman. New York: Dover. ISBN 0-486-20616-5
- Harries, Rhonda (1981). Elements of Handwriting: A Teacher's Guide. Novato: Academic Therapy Publications. ISBN 0-87879-282-1
- Jean, Georges (1992). Writing: The Story of Alphabets and Scripts, “Abrams Discoveries” series. New York: Harry N. Abrams, Inc. ISBN 0-8109-2893-0
