= Coptic Encyclopedia =

- Edited by: Aziz Suryal Atiya
- Country: United States
- Language: English
- Genre: Encyclopedia
- Publisher: Macmillan Publishers
- Published: 1991
- Media type: Print
- No. of books: Eight

The Coptic Encyclopedia is an eight-volume work covering the history, theology, language, art, architecture, archeology and hagiography of Coptic Egypt. The encyclopedia was written by over 250 Western and Egyptian contributing experts in the field of Coptology, history, art and theology and was edited by Aziz Suryal Atiya. It was funded by Coptic Pope Shenouda III, the Rockefeller Foundation, the National Endowment for the Humanities, and others.

== Characteristics ==
The Coptic Encyclopedia is the first Encyclopedia to focus on one of the Oriental Churches and since its publication in 1991 it has been used by many scholars and students in the West. The Encyclopedia is the fruit of the Coptic emigrant community in the West and the crown of the work of Aziz Suryal Atiya, who did not live to see his work carried into print.

Atiya developed the vision to publish an encyclopedia during the years he taught at the Middle East Center of the University of Utah. He formed an editorial committee and scholars from all over the world were asked to contribute. Suggestions for entries were given. The work started in 1980. Contributors included many non-Orthodox scholars, including such Muslims as Mustafa el-Fiqi and Ali el-Hillal Dessouki.

The Coptic community in the West played a role in increasing Western interest in Egyptian church life. If the interest in a Coptic Encyclopedia in English had not existed and if the project of the Coptic Encyclopedia had not received support in the Coptic migrant community in North America, the idea of producing an English Coptic Encyclopedia would have never materialized. The production of this Encyclopedia is therefore strongly linked to the growth of the Coptic migrant community in the West.

Coptic Orthodox Church leader Pope Shenouda III himself contributed to the entry about emigration. In no period of Coptic history have as many Copts migrated to the west as during the Papacy of Pope Shenouda.

In 2009, the Claremont Graduate University (CGU) School of Religion acquired the right to develop an updated and continuously expanding and evolving web-based version of the Coptic Encyclopedia.

== See also ==
- Coptic history
- Coptic Orthodox Church of Alexandria
- Coptic Egypt: The Christians of the Nile
