= Susanne Lautenbacher =

German violinist (1932–2020)

Susanne Lautenbacher (19 April 1932 – 15 September 2020) was a German violinist. She studied violin with the Munich-based violin pedagogue Karl Freund (first violin of the Freund Quartet) and later with Henryk Szeryng. She was a prizewinner in the early years of the Munich ARD Violin Competition. On some early recordings her name appears as Suzanne or Susi. She died on 15 September 2020 aged 88 and is buried in the Waldfriedhof in Leonberg.

Lautenbacher made a large number of gramophone recordings, and featured in numerous recordings of concertos and chamber music between the late 1950s and early 1990s, on labels such as Vox, Turnabout, Intercord, Bärenreiter-Musicaphon, Bayer, and many others. She has recorded works by Biber, Locatelli, Bach, Vivaldi, Haydn, Mozart including two of the five Violin Concertos and the Concertone K. 190, Beethoven including the Concerto, both Romances and the 'Spring' and 'Kreutzer' Sonatas, J.N. Hummel, Schubert, Rolla, Mendelssohn, Schumann, Spohr, Viotti, Brahms, Reger, Béla Bartók, Kurt Weill, Karl Amadeus Hartmann, Hans Pfitzner, Hans Werner Henze, Hans Schaeuble, Giorgio Federico Ghedini (Concerto dell'albatro) and Bernd Alois Zimmermann. She also made numerous concert appearances, especially with the Württemberg Chamber Orchestra, Heilbronn, conducted by Jörg Faerber. Among other works, Lautenbacher instigated and premièred the Concerto for violin and voices Orpheus (1978/9) by Arthur Dangel and the Violin Concerto Septuarchie (1975) by Eva Schorr. She also performed regularly in chamber music, principally with the Bell'Arte Trio (Stuttgart), Ulrich Koch (viola), Thomas Blees then Martin Ostertag (cello), and the pianist Martin Galling. With other instrumentalists, the Trio also appeared as the Bell'Arte Ensemble.

Lautenbacher taught the violin for many years at the Stuttgart Conservatoire where she was appointed to a professorship in 1965. Her husband, Heinz Jansen (1906–2002), a violinist in the Armin Lutz and Karl Freund String Quartets and also a viola player in the Edwin Fischer Chamber Orchestra, after the War became a recording engineer and producer who founded and directed his own classical music recording company, the Südwest-Tonstudio Stuttgart, where many of Susanne Lautenbacher's numerous recordings were made. Lautenbacher died on 15 September 2020, at the age of 88.
