= Georges Jean =

French poet and essayist (1920-2011)

- Born: 16 September 1920; Besançon, France
- Died: 19 December 2011 (aged 91)
- Education: École normale supérieure de Saint-Cloud
- Occupations: Linguist, semiotician, poet, children's literature writer
- Notable work: Writing: The Story of Alphabets and Scripts
- Awards: ‘Mention’ Budding Critic Award of Bologna Children's Book Fair

Georges Jean (16 September 1920 – 19 December 2011) was a French poet and essayist specializing in the fields of linguistics, semiology and children's literature.

== Career ==
Georges Jean was born in Besançon, after studying philosophy, he entered the École normale supérieure de Saint-Cloud. He has devoted himself to teaching linguistics, poetry and semiology in the city Le Mans and the University of Maine where he was professor of linguistics and semiology from 1967 to 1981. He was the leader of the Centre international poésie-enfance (‘International Poetry-Childhood Centre’), participated in the ministerial committee for theatrical creation. He was a teacher at the École Nationale Supérieure des Sciences de l'Information et des Bibliothèques, and published more than 70 books including several collections of poems, essays and theories on poetry and pedagogy.

His book Le plaisir des mots : Dictionnaire poétique illustré won the ‘Mention’ Budding Critic Award from Bologna Children's Book Fair in 1983. Another book L’écriture, mémoire des hommes (English edition – Writing: The Story of Alphabets and Scripts) was one of the bestsellers in France, and has been translated into 21 languages.

== Selected bibliography ==
- Le plaisir des mots : Dictionnaire poétique illustré, collection « Découverte Cadet », série Hors série. Éditions Gallimard, 1982
- Dictionnaire des poètes et de la poésie, Éditions Gallimard, 1983
- Bachelard, l’enfance et la pédagogie, Éditions du Scarabée, 1983
- L’écriture, mémoire des hommes, collection « Découvertes Gallimard » (nº 24), série Archéologie. Éditions Gallimard, 1987, new edition in 2007 (translated into 21 languages with a total of 24 international editions)
  - US edition – Writing: The Story of Alphabets and Scripts, "Abrams Discoveries" series. Harry N. Abrams, 1992
  - UK edition – Writing: The Story of Alphabets and Scripts, ‘New Horizons’ series. Thames & Hudson, 1992
- Langage de signes : L’écriture et son double, collection « Découvertes Gallimard » (nº 67), série Archéologie. Éditions Gallimard, 1989
  - U.S. edition – Signs, Symbols, and Ciphers, "Abrams Discoveries" series. Harry N. Abrams, 1998
  - UK edition – Signs, Symbols and Ciphers: Decoding the Message, ‘New Horizons’ series. Thames & Hudson, 1999
- Voyages en Utopie, collection « Découvertes Gallimard » (nº 200), série Littératures. Éditions Gallimard, 1994
