= Victor Solkin =

Russian Egyptologist

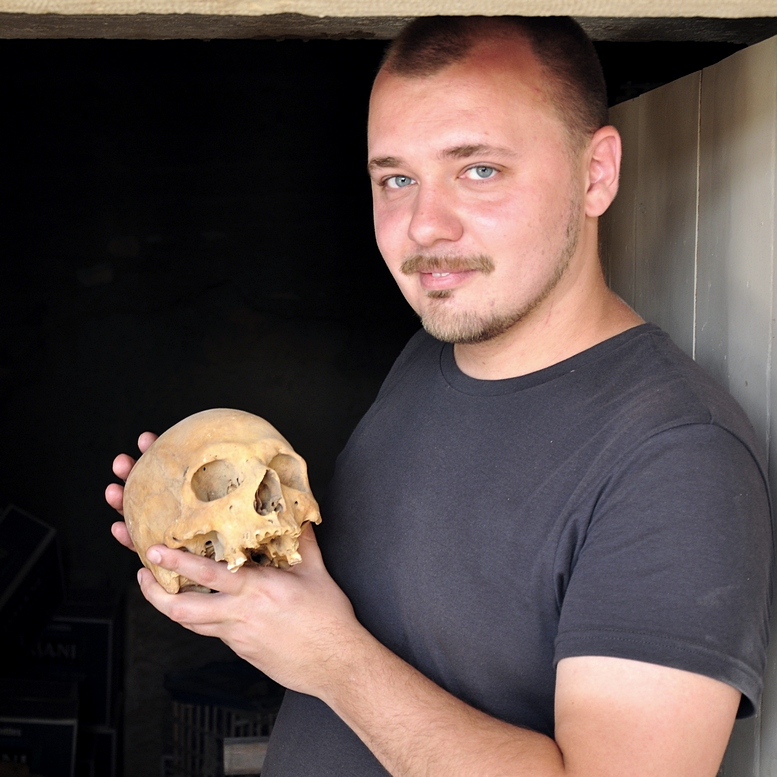
Victor Solkin

Victor Victorovich Solkin (Russian: Ви́ктор Ви́кторович Со́лкин; born January 7, 1977, Moscow) is a Russian historian (Egyptology), museologist, lecturer, founder and leader of the Association for the Study of Ancient Egypt MAAT.

He graduated from the Peoples' Friendship University of Russia, Faculty of Humanities and Social Sciences, Department of General History. From 1993 he began to study the ancient Egyptian language at the Center for Egyptological Studies of the Russian Academy of Sciences. Since 1994, he became an employee of the center, worked there until 2000. Together with colleagues prepared several archaeological photo exhibitions.

Participant of two International Egyptological congresses. As an employee of the CEI RAS, within his competence, he participated in the work of an archaeological expedition to Tell Basta in 1998, conducted by the CEI RAS together with Zagazig University. in 2004 at the IX Congress in Grenoble presented a report on the comprehensive restoration of St. Petersburg sphinxes.

Since 1998, Solkin has actively collaborated with the media, was the main character, or invited expert Egyptologist. Popularizer of Egyptology in scientific and educational (GEO, Around the World, Oriental Collection, Fyodor Konyukhov's Magazine) and esoteric (New Acropolis) magazines. Author of more than 100 scientific and popular scientific publications related to the history and culture of ancient Egypt, the editor and one of the authors of the first Russian national encyclopedia Ancient Egypt, published in 2005 with the preface of Dr. Zahi Hawass.

Dmitry Prusakov noted the textual similarities between Solkin's books and the works of other authors. In particular, in the book The Sun of the Rulers Solkin includes in his text significant fragments from the works of Yury Perepelkin, Iosif Stuchevsky, Mikhail Korostovtsev, Militsa Matie.

== Works in English ==
- The Sculptural Representation of the Prince Khaemwaset in Moscow // Proceedings of the Eighth International Congress of Egyptologists. Cairo, 2003, vol. III, pp. 401–405.
- The Amenhotep III Sphinxes of St. Petersburg, Russia // KMT. The Modern Journal of Ancient Egypt. Vol. 14 (winter 2003–2004). pp. 34–41.
- The Sphinxes of Amenhotep III in St. Petersburg: unique Monuments and their Restoration. // IX Congres International des Egyptologues. Grenoble, 2004.
- Sphinxes of St. Petersburg: History of purchase and general analysis of the monuments // Sphinxes of St. Petersburg. Sun of Egypt on the banks of the Neva. Spb, 2005. pp. 198–210.
- Amenhotep III: the Personality, Epoch and the Style of Civilisation // Sphinxes of St. Petersburg. Sun of Egypt on the banks of the Neva. Spb, 2005, pp. 224–245.
- Egyptian St. Petersburg: Egyptomania on the Banks of the Neva with Vladimir Larchenko. A Modern Journal of Ancient Egypt Vol. 16, no. 2. Summer 2005. pp. 78–87.
- Attraction of Egypt. On the occasion of the 150th Birthday Anniversary of Vladimir Golenishchev. // Ancient Egypt. Studies on the occasion of the 150th Birthday Anniversary of Golenischev. Annual of the Association of Ancient Egypt Studies MAAT, vol. II. — Moscow, 2006, pp. 1–10.
- Otto Friedriech von Richter and Egyptian collection of the Kramskoy Regional Museum of Fine Arts (Voronezh) // Ancient Egypt. Studies on the occasion of the 150th Birthday Anniversary of Golenishchev. Annual of the Association of Ancient Egypt Studies MAAT, vol. II. — Moscow, 2006, pp. 125–135.
- Attraction of Egypt. A Modern Journal of Ancient Egypt. Vol. 17, no. 4. Winter 2006–2007.
- Egyptian masterpieces in the collection of the State Hermitage (St. Petersburg, Russia) // KMT. A Modern Journal of Ancient Egypt. Vol. 21, no. 3. Fall 2010. pp. 54–70.
