= Christian Cannuyer =

Belgian Coptologist

- Born: 17 December 1957 (age 68)
- Occupations: Coptologist, historian of religion
- Notable work: Coptic Egypt: The Christians of the Nile
- Awards: Prix Eugène Goblet d'Alviella

Christian Cannuyer (born 17 December 1957) is a Belgian historian of religion, professor at the Lille Catholic University, a specialist in Coptic studies and a genealogist.

== Career ==
Christian Cannuyer teaches ancient Near Eastern religions, Christian church history, and Coptic language at the Theological Faculty of Lille Catholic University. He has published a number of books, including a volume on the Copts – Les Coptes (1990, collection "Fils d'Abraham"), which won the 1991 Eugène Goblet d'Alviella Prize in the History of Religions of the Royal Academy of Belgium; a lavishly illustrated pocket book for the collection "Découvertes Gallimard" – L'Égypte copte, les chrétiens du Nil (2000), which is only available in English and French. He has also authored many articles, such as Akhénaton, précurseur du monothéisme ?, Histoire de la Nubie chrétienne, et cetera.

Cannuyer is editor of the "Fils d'Abraham" collection at Brepols, published in collaboration with the Centre Informatique et Bible of the Maredsous Abbey. He is the president of the Société Royale Belge d'Études Orientales since 1994 and member of the Administrative Council of the Francophone Association of Coptic Studies. Since 2013, he is director of the magazine Solidarité-Orient in Brussels. In addition to Coptology and genealogy, Cannuyer also writes on the subject of Baháʼí Faith, and a secretary of the Marcel Thémont Association which, since 1990, has campaigned for the defense of the heritage of Brugelette.

== Selected bibliography ==
- Les Coptes, collection « Fils d'Abraham ». Éditions Brepols, 1990
- L'Égypte copte, les chrétiens du Nil, collection « Découvertes Gallimard » (nº 395), série Religions. Éditions Gallimard, 2000
  - UK edition – Coptic Egypt: The Christians of the Nile, 'New Horizons' series. Thames & Hudson, 2001
  - US edition – Coptic Egypt: The Christians of the Nile, "Abrams Discoveries" series. Harry N. Abrams, 2001
- Coptes du Nil : Entre les pharaons et l'Islam, ces chrétiens d'Égypte aujourd'hui, Éditions L'Archange Minotaure, 2007
- La girafe dans l'Égypte ancienne et le verbe « sr », collection « Acta Orientalia Subsidia ». Éditions de la Société Belge d'Études Orientales, 2010

Collective work

- AA.VV., L'Art copte en Égypte : 2000 ans de christianisme, « Livres d'Art ». Éditions Gallimard, 2000
- AA.VV., The Bible, its languages and its translations, Bayard, 2014
