= Françoise Dunand =

French historian

- Born: 1934 (age 91–92)
- Occupations: Historian, Egyptologist
- Notable work: Mummies: A Voyage Through Eternity
- Awards: Prix Clio pour la recherche archéologique ('Prix Clio for archaeological research')

Françoise Dunand (French pronunciation: [fʁɑ̃swaz dynɑ̃]; born 1934) is a French historian, professor emeritus of the University of Strasbourg. She is a specialist in Greek and Roman Egypt.

== Career ==
Since 1981, Françoise Dunand has been leading the "Alpha Necropolis" team to excavate the necropolises at the Kharga Oasis in Egypt. She is a former member of the Institut Français d'Archéologie Orientale (IFAO) in Cairo, she has published a number of books and articles on late Egyptian religious beliefs and practices. Since 1983 she has directed IFAO archaeological excavations at the necropolis at the village of Duch in Egypt's western desert. The findings at Duch are partly presented in her book Les momies : Un voyage dans l'éternité.

She frequently collaborates with Roger Lichtenberg, a medical doctor and director of the radiology unit at the Institut Arthur Vernes in Paris. He has conducted anthropological and palaeopathological studies on the mummies of Duch, and is co-author of Les momies : Un voyage dans l'éternité.

She participated in the writing of a collective work La mort et l'immortalité : Encyclopédie des savoirs et des croyances by signing in the second chapter entitled La mort et le devenir du corps, an article Des corps sortis du temps.

== Awards ==
- 1999: Prix Clio for archaeological research – Special Jury Prize for her Etude archéologique et anthropologique de la nécropole d'El Deioasis de Kharga
- 2002: Prix Clio for archaeological research – for her Kharga

== Selected publications ==
- Co-author with Roger Lichtenberg, Les momies : Un voyage dans l'éternité, collection « Découvertes Gallimard » (nº 118), série Archéologie. Éditions Gallimard, 1991 (new edition in 2007)
  - US edition – Mummies: A Voyage Through Eternity, "Abrams Discoveries" series. Harry N. Abrams, 1994
  - UK edition – Mummies: A Journey Through Eternity, 'New Horizons' series. Thames & Hudson, 1994
- Co-author with Roger Lichtenberg, Les égyptiens, coll. « Les grandes civilisations ». Éditions du Chêne, 2004
- Co-author with Christiane Zivie-Coche, Gods and Men in Egypt: 3000 BCE to 395 CE, Cornell University Press, 2004
- Co-author with Roger Lichtenberg, Mummies and Death in Egypt, Cornell University Press, 2007
- Isis, mère des dieux, coll. « Babel ». Actes Sud, 2008

Participated in the collective work

- AA.VV., La mort et l'immortalité : Encyclopédie des savoirs et des croyances, Bayard, 2004

== Documentary ==
Les Momies du Désert (lit. 'The Mummies of the Desert'), a 13-minute short documentary film about Françoise Dunand's archaeological dig at the Kharga Oasis, directed by Serge Tignères and Alain Zenou. It is part of the DVD Le mystère des momies from Arte's documentary series The Human Adventure, and available in English.
