= Jean Vercoutter =

French Egyptologist (1911–2000)

- Born: 20 January 1911; Lambersart, France
- Died: 16 July 2000 (aged 89)
- Occupation: Egyptologist
- Notable work: The Search for Ancient Egypt

Jean Vercoutter (20 January 1911 – 16 July 2000) was a French Egyptologist. One of the pioneers of archaeological research into Sudan from 1953, he was Director of the Institut Français d'Archéologie Orientale from 1977 to 1981.

== Biography ==
Born in Lambersart, Nord, Vercoutter attended the Académie Julian to learn about painting, but soon turned to Egyptology. In 1939, he graduated from the IVe section of the École Pratique des Hautes Études with a thesis on ancient Egyptian funerary objects and was appointed resident of the French Institute of Oriental Archaeology of Cairo (IFAO). He participated in excavations in Karnak and directed an excavation in El-Tod.

Upon his return to France, he joined CNRS (1949–1955). During all these years, he pursued research on the relationship between Egyptians and pre-Hellenes, providing some firm conclusions on the relationship between these two great civilizations and the history of the ancient Aegean world. He was appointed professor at the University of Lille in 1960 and was one of the pioneers in archaeological research into Sudan. Between 1960 and 1964, he concentrated on studying Kor and Aksha, where he had been working in part since 1953, as they were threatened by the construction of the new Aswan Dam. He excavated structures such as the temple of Ramesses II, a Meroitic cemetery, as well as other small cemeteries. Vercoutter also excavated at the site of Saï.

Between 1965 and 1967, together with Elena Cassin and Jean Bottéro, he was the editor of the three volumes of the Fischer Weltgeschichte (Fischer World History) devoted to the Ancient East.

He was Director of the Institut Français d'Archéologie Orientale from 1977 to 1981. Until his death in 2000, he was still active in the subject, publishing Les barrages pharaoniques. Leur raison d'être in 1994. He is the author of À la recherche de l'Égypte oubliée, first volume of the collection "Découvertes Gallimard", which was a bestseller in France, it has been translated into 22 languages and often reprinted.

== Publications ==
- With Cyril Aldred, J.L. Cenival, F. Debono, Christiane Desroches Noblecourt, Jean-Philippe Lauer et Jean Leclant, Le temps des pyramides, L'univers des formes, Gallimard, Paris, 1978.
- With Ch. Desroches Noblecourt, Un siècle de fouilles françaises en Égypte 1880-1980, à l'occasion du centenaire de l'école du Caire (IFAO), musée du Louvre, musée d'art et d'essai, Palais de Tokyo, Paris, 21 mai / 15 octobre 1981, IFAO, Le Caire, 1981.
- Essai sur les relations entre Égyptiens et pré-hellènes, n°6, L'orient ancien illustré, A. Maisonneuve, Paris, 1954.
- L'Égypte et le monde égéen pré-hellénique, étude critique des sources Égyptiennes du début de la Dynastie égyptienne XVIIIe à la fin de la XIXe dynastie égyptienne, n° 22, BdE, IFAO, Le Caire, 1956.
- L'Égypte ancienne, Que sais-je ?, n° 247, PUF, Paris, 1960, 1982.
- Institut français d'archéologie orientale du Caire, Livre du Centenaire (1880-1980), n° 104, MIFAO, Le Caire, 1980.
- Les Affamés d'Ounas et le changement climatique de la fin de l'Ancien Empire, MGEM, IFAO, Le Caire, 1985.
- À la recherche de l'Égypte oubliée, collection « Découvertes Gallimard » (nº 1), série Archéologie. Paris : Éditions Gallimard, 1986 (reprinted 1988, 1991, 1998, 2000 and new edition in 2007; translated into 22 languages with a total of 25 national editions).
  - Translated into English by Ruth Sharman, US edition – The Search for Ancient Egypt, "Abrams Discoveries" series. New York: Harry N. Abrams, 1992.
  - UK edition – The Search for Ancient Egypt, 'New Horizons' series. London: Thames & Hudson, 1992.
- L'Égypte à la chambre noire : Francis Frith, photographe de l'Égypte retrouvée, coll. « Découvertes Gallimard Albums », Paris : Éditions Gallimard, 1992.
- L'Égypte et la vallée du Nil, des origines à la fin de l'ancien empire 12000-2000 Av. J.-C., Nouvelle Clio, PUF, Paris, 1992.
  - Translated into Russian by Nina Zhivlova (Н.Ю. Живлова) and Ivan Bogdanov (И.В. Богданов) – Египет и долина Нила, с древнейших времен до конца Древнего царства. 12000-2000 гг. до н.э. СПб.: Нестор-История, 2015.
- Le déchiffrement des hiéroglyphes égyptiens 1680-1840, pp. 579–586, The Intellectual Heritage of Egypt, Budapest, 1992.
- La fin de l'Ancien Empire : un nouvel examen, Vol. 2, pp. 557–562, Atti del VI Congresso Internazionale di Egittologia, Turin, 1993.
- Les barrages pharaoniques. Leur raison d'être, pp. 315–326, Les problèmes institutionnels de l'eau en Égypte ancienne et dans l'Antiquité méditerranéenne, IFAO, Le Caire, 1994.
- Étude des techniques de construction dans l'Égypte ancienne, 3, la décoration des parois, son principe et les dangers d'équivoques qu'elle peut entraîner en ce qui concerne la datation des édifices, MGEM, IFAO, Le Caire, 1985.
