= Jean-Pierre Corteggiani =

French Egyptologist (1942–2022)

- Born: 1942; France, Germany or France
- Died: 15 March 2022 (aged 79); Sylvains-les-Moulins, France
- Occupation: Egyptologist
- Notable work: The Pyramids of Giza: Facts, Legends and Mysteries

Jean-Pierre Corteggiani (1942 – 15 March 2022) was a French Egyptologist.

== Career ==
In 1993, a dyke was to be built on the alleged site of the Lighthouse of Alexandria. A rescue operation was entrusted to Jean-Yves Empereur and Jean-Pierre Corteggiani to undertake a search campaign. In 2001, he was awarded the Jean-Édouard Goby Prize from the Institut de France for his works on ancient Egypt.

He was director of IFAO’s scientific and technical relations until 2007.

He was the author of several books and articles, he highlights his work in the book Le Caire, a collective work on Cairo published by Citadelles & Mazenod.

== Selected publications ==
- The Egypt of the Pharaohs at the Cairo Museum, Hachette, 1993
- Toutânkhamon : Le trésor, collection « Découvertes Gallimard Hors série ». Éditions Gallimard, 2000
- Les Grandes Pyramides : Chronique d’un mythe, collection « Découvertes Gallimard » (nº 501), série Archéologie. Éditions Gallimard, 2006
  - US edition – The Great Pyramids, “Abrams Discoveries” series. Harry N. Abrams, 2007
  - UK edition – The Pyramids of Giza: Facts, Legends and Mysteries, ‘New Horizons’ series. Thames & Hudson, 2007
- L’Égypte ancienne et ses dieux : Dictionnaire illustré, Fayard, 2007
