= Livre d'art =

Books in which the illustration is predominant

Livres d'art (French for art books or books of art), otherwise referred to as livres de galerie (French for gallery books), are books in which the illustration holds a predominant place in relation to the text. They often require high quality papers as they belong in the category of high quality publications.

== History ==
According to a presentation from Élie Faure's Histoire de l'art (originally published from 1919–1921), the livre d'art was a new genre within the field of modern art, where each commentary (text) could be compared to the works (works of art, images) themselves, the juxtaposition and confrontation of images justifying the audacity of the connections between text and image which sometimes seem unusual.

The Éditions Hazan, a Paris-based publisher specialising in producing livres d'art, which presents itself as la référence du livre d'art, launched a collection of artist monographs entitled "ABC" at the end of the 1950s. The books were produced in pocket format and intended for a general audience. Since 1980, the Prix Élie-Faure has been presented on an annual basis to reward the best livre d'art.

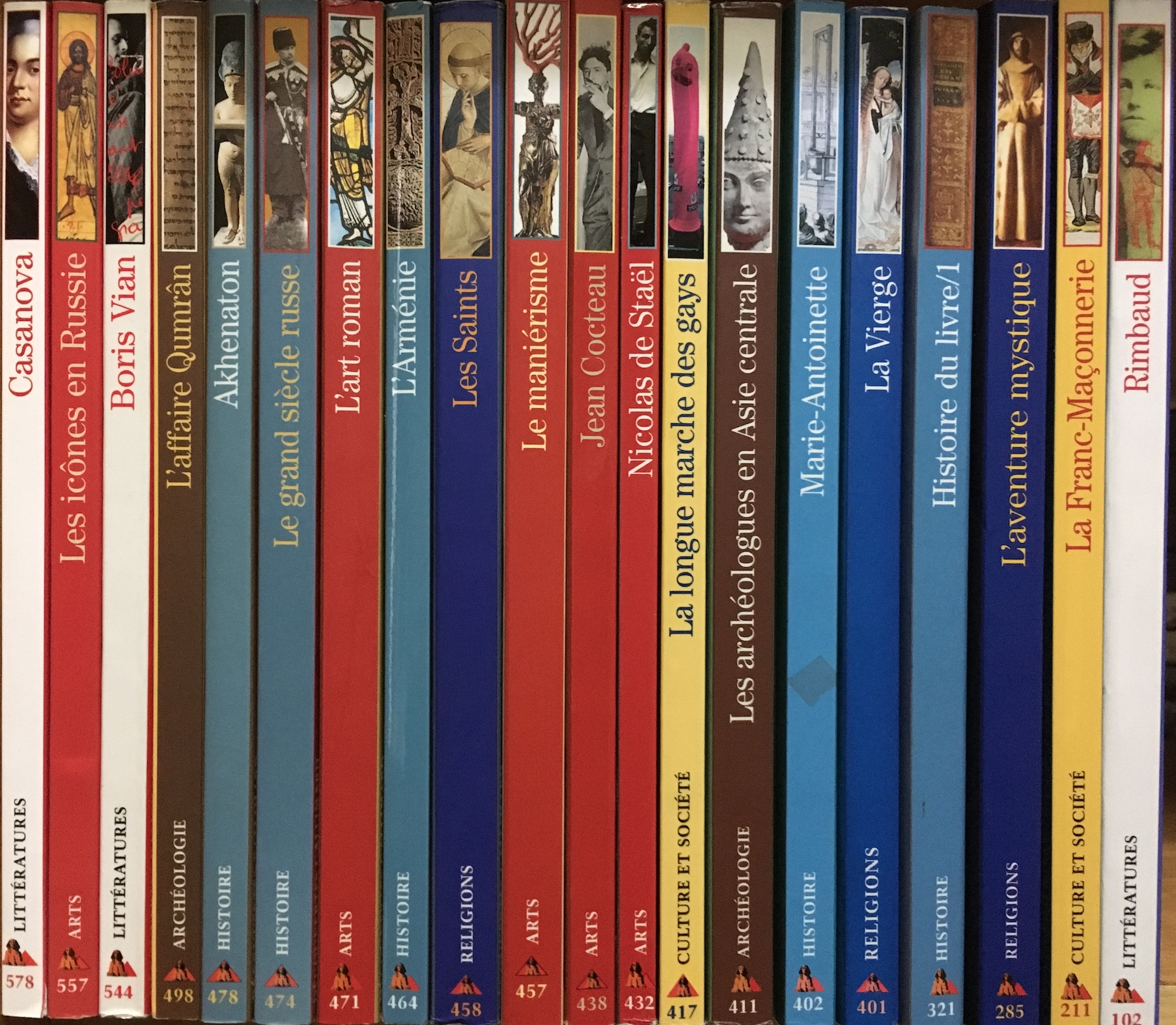
"Découvertes Gallimard", a collection of monographs published like art books.

The "Découvertes" collection launched by Éditions Gallimard in 1986 is a new kind of artistic encyclopaedia with a dynamic page layout. Produced in pocket format and illustrated in colour, these books treat a wide range of subjects such as arts, archaeology, history, literature, music, philosophy, religion, sports, technology, all based on an abundant pictorial documentation and a way of bringing together visual documents and texts, enhanced by printing on coated paper. As commented in L'Express: "All served by omnipresent iconography, which is in harmony with the text. [...] In short, genuine monographs, published like art books. [...] 'Découvertes' changed the face of encyclopaedism and art book, adapting the book to the era of 'zapping'."

In 2003, the Prix Livre d'art of the awards ceremony La Nuit du livre was established by Élisabeth Chainet, according to her, the prize "celebrates beauty in books, these masterpieces that reveal two talents: that of the author, whether he is a writer, photographer or illustrator, but also that of the manufacturer. The beauty of a book is in fact the result of a perfect encounter between the intellectual world of the author and the technical world of the manufacturer." Mimmo Paladino's Iliade and Odyssée became the first winners of the prize, which are outstanding for their "adequacy between Paladino's illustrations and Homer's texts, the quality of page layout by Richard Médioni, the choice of paper, typography, binding, etc."

== See also ==
- Bible moralisée
- Biblia pauperum
- Artist's book
- Book art (fine art)
- Book of Common Prayer (1845 illuminated version)
- Coffee table book
- Fine press
- Graphic novel
- Golden Age of Illustration
- Illuminated manuscript
- Miniature (illuminated manuscript)
- Picture book
- World of Art
