= Pocket edition =

Small-sized version of a book

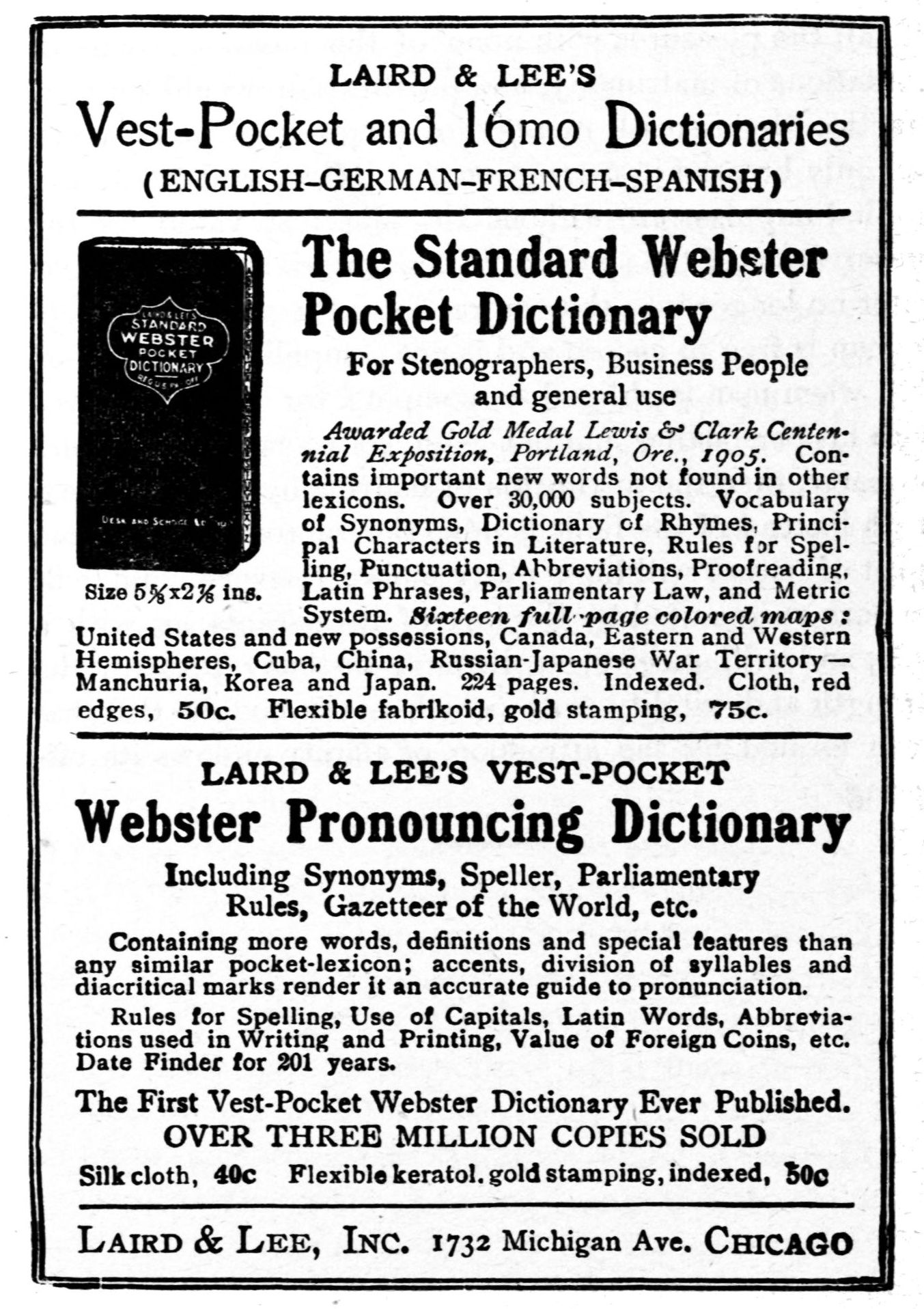
1895 advertisement for a pocket edition of Webster's Dictionary

A pocket edition is a small-sized copy of a book intended to fit in one's pocket. Small, pocket-sized variations of books have existed from early times. For example, the early 8th-century gospel book known as the St Cuthbert Gospel has a page size of only 138 by 92 millimetres (5.4 in × 3.6 in). However, the concept of producing a specific pocket edition of a book dates to the 20th century. It refers to an edition that has been altered to fit in the reader's pocket, usually by using thinner paper, smaller print, and abbreviation of the text:

When a publisher wishes to produce a pocket edition of a book he can reduce the size of the print, and the thickness of the paper and covers; but he cannot do this indefinitely if the book is to remain legible and serviceable; a time comes when he must also abridge the text, abbreviating of cutting out any appendices or other portions, which, though perhaps interesting in themselves, are not really necessary to the main purpose of the work.

Pocket editions have been criticized as "not really suitable for library use", with the recommendation that "those bought to cover gaps when no alternative was available should be relegated to reserve as soon as they can be replaced".

One kind of book popularly issued in the pocket format is the pocket dictionary as an edition of larger dictionaries. A pocket dictionary generally "contains no more than 75,000 entries", with abbreviated information about each entry, compared to the 170,000 entries or more of a typical desk dictionary, making the pocket dictionary inadequate for use by students beyond the high school level. One critic has described the pocket dictionary as "almost worthless, except as a flimsy guide to spelling and pronunciation". A countervailing view is that although a pocket dictionary can not replace the desk dictionary, "as a portable learning tool, the pocket dictionary is worth its weight in gold".

Another type of pocket size books that were popular among professionals before they have been replaced by smart phones is a specialized reference books. They ranged from very technical catalog of standards for structural engineers, to "Nephrology Pocket" - a digest of medical textbook on nephrology that contains all essential diagrams and tables.

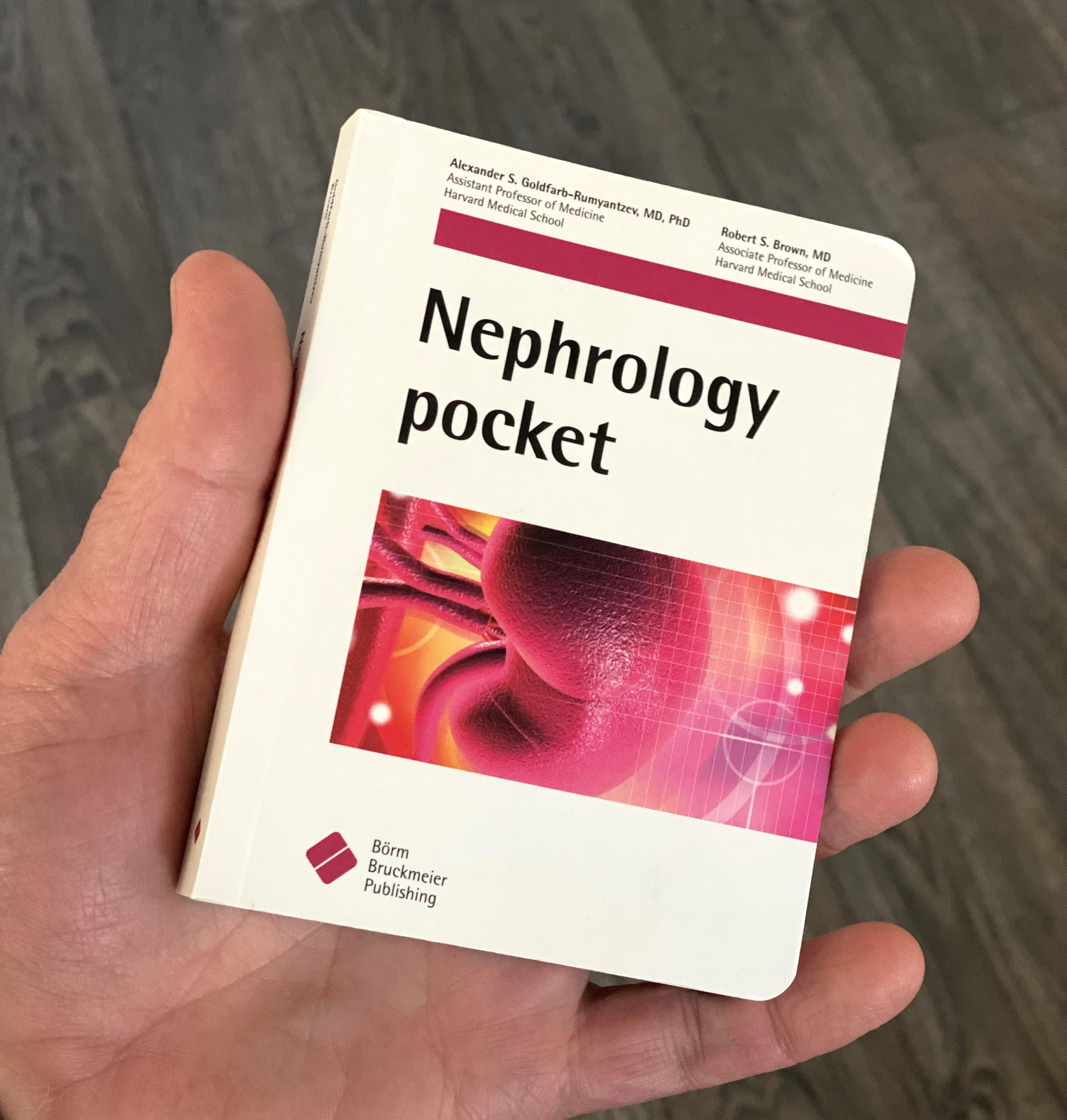
Nephrology pocket by Alexander S. Goldfarb-Rumyantzev and Robert S. Brown

== See also ==
- Miniature book
