= TT388 =

Theban tomb

Theban tomb TT388
- Burial site of Unknown
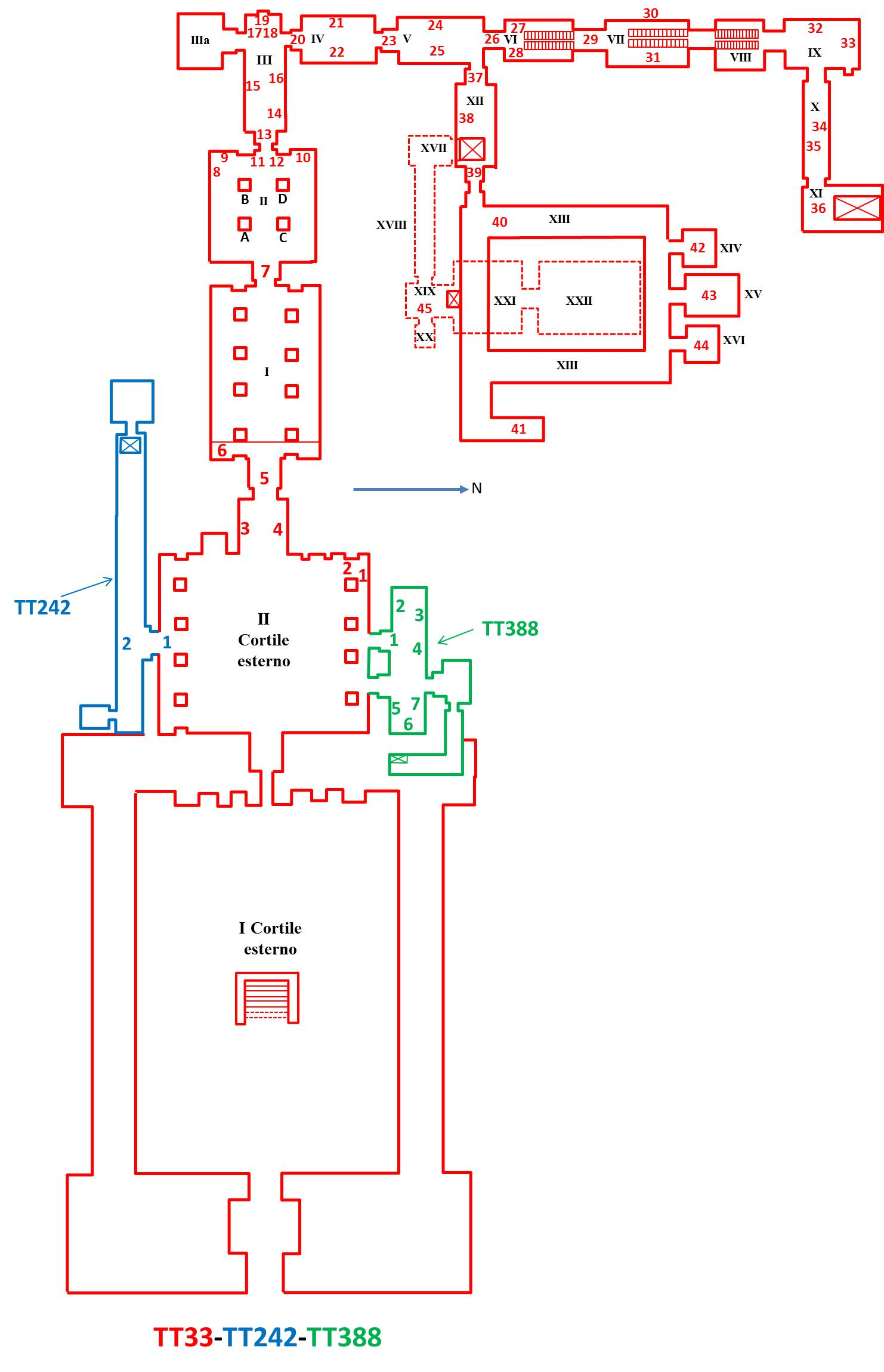

- Location within Egypt
- Location: El-Assasif, Theban Necropolis
- ← Previous; TT387 Next → TT389

The Theban Tomb TT388 is located in El-Assasif, part of the Theban Necropolis, on the west bank of the Nile, opposite to Luxor.

This tomb is accessed from the forecourt of TT33, the tomb of Pediamenopet. On the opposite side of the courtyard another tomb, TT242 belonging to an official named Wahibre, was discovered. All tombs are dated to the Saite Period (Twenty-sixth Dynasty of Egypt).

The name of the owner of TT388 is not known. The scenes decorating the tomb all show offering scenes. No texts were found

== See also ==
- List of Theban tombs
