= Agnès Cabrol =

French Egyptologist (1964–2007)

- Born: 2 July 1964; Avignon, France
- Died: 2007 (aged 42–43); Gordes, Vaucluse, France

Academic background
- Education: University of Lille III; University of Paris IV; Ecole du Louvre
- Doctoral advisor: Dominique Valbelle
- Other advisors: Christiane Ziegler; Claude Traunecker; Guillemette Andreu

Academic work
- Discipline: Egyptology
- Main interests: Thebes, Egypt

Agnès Cabrol (2 July 1964 in Avignon – January 2007 in Gordes, Vaucluse) was a French Egyptologist.

== Life and work ==
Born in Provence, Agnès Cabrol encountered Egyptology in her reading and quickly dreamed of devoting her life to it. She graduated from the Ecole du Louvre in 1987, having studied under Christiane Ziegler, Claude Traunecker, and Guillemette Andreu.

After graduation from the University of Paris IV, she went on an expedition in 1991 of the Theban region of the New Kingdom of Egypt, under the direction Professor Nicolas Grimal. For the Franco-Egyptian Centre for the Study of Karnak (CFEETK), she collected epigraphic data and made numerous archaeological observations. She also examined the Tomb of Khabekhenet with Claude Traunecker.

Broadening her field of investigation to ancient processional rites, she then tried to reconstruct the liturgical context, the routes, the navigations and the modes of circulation of the processions in the Theban region. On this subject, she first defended a DEA in 1992, then a thesis in 1995 at the University of Lille- III, under the direction of Dominique Valbelle. On the advice of Professor Jan Quaegebeur, she published The Processional Ways of Thebes in the series Orientalia Loviensia Analecta, in 2001, thanks to Professor Harco Willems, Jan Quaegebeur's successor in Louvain.

Gillam notes the work that Cabrol contributed to in the understanding of the temples of the New Kingdom, and her attention to political and religious symbolism. Cabrol obtained a PhD from the University of Lille III in 1995, under the direction of Professor Dominique Valbelle and remained there to lecture and founded two associations "Papyrus" and "Vasco de Gama" associations in Lille.

Cabrol curated the exhibition: Tombs of the Nile, funerary treasures of Nubia, which was held at Château de Flers in Villeneuve d'Ascq in 1998.

Cabrol became an expert on Thebes, and was the author of numerous books and papers, notably Amenhotep III: le Magnifique (2000), Les voies procesionelles de Thèbes (2001), and Regards sur l'orientalisme et l'égyptologie (2006).

In 2003, Cabrol was appointed lecturer in Lille although she was already ill. She died in her village of Gordes (Vaucluse) on 7 January 2007.
