= Johannes Dümichen =

German Egyptologist (1833–1894)

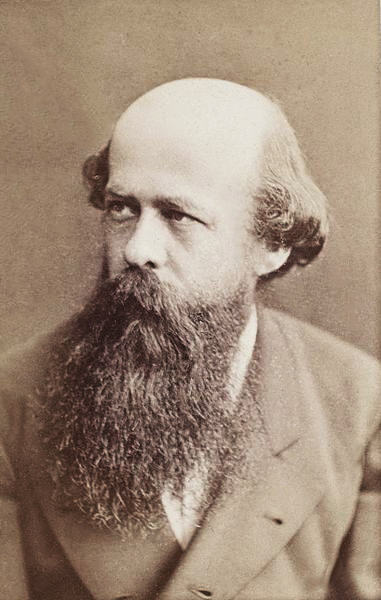
Johannes Dümichen

Johannes Dümichen (15 October 1833, Weißholz bei Großglogau – 7 February 1894, Strasbourg) was a German Egyptologist.

== Biography ==
Dümichen was born near Glogau. He studied philology and theology in Berlin and Breslau. Subsequently, he became a pupil of Karl Lepsius and Heinrich Brugsch, and devoted himself to the study of Egyptian inscriptions. He travelled widely in Egypt, and published his results in a number of important books.

He was tasked by the Prussian government to explore the Nile Valley in 1862 and 1868. On the first expedition (1862–65), along with investigations of the Nile Valley in Egypt, he also conducted extensive research in Nubia and the Sudan. In 1869 he accompanied the Prussian Crown Prince to Egypt on the occasion of the opening of the Suez Canal. On his fourth trip to Egypt (1875), he studied the inscriptions of the largest private tomb in the Theban Necropolis.

He was elected to the American Philosophical Society in 1869.

In 1872 he was chosen professor of Egyptology at Strasbourg, where a new chair was created to compete with the famous chair of Egyptology at the Collège de France.

== Works ==
The value of his work consists not only in the stores of material which he collected, but also in the success with which he dealt with many of the problems raised by the inscriptions. Among his works are:

- Bauurkunde des Tempels von Dendera (1865) – Wall texts from the Dendera temple complex.
- Geographische Inschriften altägyptischer Denkmäler (4 vols., 1865—1885) – Geographical inscriptions from ancient Egyptian monuments.
- Altägyptische Kalenderinschriften (1866) – Ancient Egyptian calendar inscriptions.
- Altägyptische Tempelinschriften (2 vols., 1867) – Ancient Egyptian temple inscriptions.
  - Band 1: Weihinschriften aus dem Horustempel von Edfu (Apollinopolis Magna) — Dedicatory inscriptions from the Temple of Horus at Edfu.
  - Band 2: Weihinschriften aus dem Hathortempel von Dendera (Tentyra) — Dedicatory inscriptions from the Temple of Hathor at Dendera.
- Historische Inschriften altägyptische Denkmäler (2 vols., 1867–1869) – Historical inscriptions of ancient Egyptian monuments.
- Baugeschichte des Denderatempels (1877) — Architectural history of the Dendera Temple.
- Die Oasen der libyschen Wüste (1877) — The oases of the Libyan Desert.
- Geschichte des alten Aegypten (1879) – History of ancient Egypt.
- Die kalendarischen Opferfestlisten von Medinet-Habu (1881) – The calendrical Sacrifice-Festival lists in the temple of Medinet Habu.
- Der Grabpalast des Patuamenap in der thebanischen Nekropolis (1884–1894) — The grave-palace of Pediamenopet in the Theban Necropolis.
  - Band 1: Inschriften über Titel und Würden der Verstorbenen und Verzeichnis der alljährlichen Todtenfesttage. Leipzig 1884 UB Heidelberg.
  - Band 2: Darstellungen und Inschriften der Zimmer V, IV, III. Leipzig 1885 UB Heidelberg.
  - Band 3. Leipzig 1894 UB Heidelberg.

Der Grabpalast des Patuamenap, originally intended to comprise six volumes, was left unfinished at Dümichen's death. Part 3 was published after his death by Wilhelm Spiegelberg.

Geographische Inschriften comprises four volumes of plates. The first two volumes include Dümichen's commentary. His commentary on volumes 3 and 4 was left incomplete at his death; those plates were published in 1885 without commentary.
