= Stick shabti =

Ancient Egyptian ushabtis

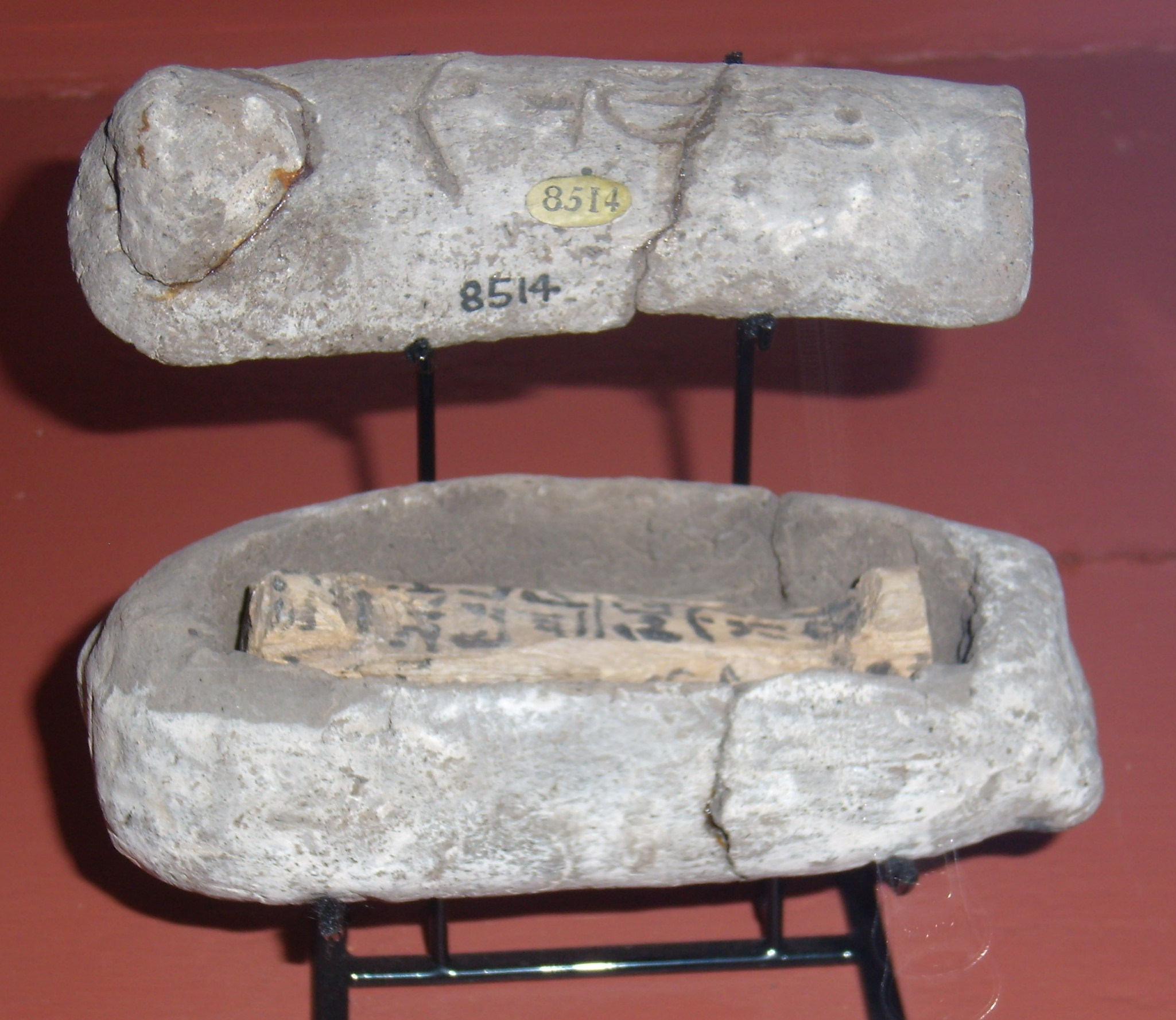
Stick ushabti in a model coffin

Stick shabtis (or stick ushabtis) are ancient Egyptian ushabtis made of wood.

== Description ==
They have a rough, anthropoid shape, are not well-carved and bear just one inscription on the front. Unlike the normal Egyptian ushabtis which are sometimes small artworks in the own right, they are not painted or further decorated.

== Date ==
Stick shabtis date to the end of the 17th Dynasty and the beginning of the 18th Dynasty (around 1550 BC).

== Function ==
Stick shabtis had a different purpose to most of the normal ushabtis. While ushabtis were most often placed into the burial chamber and had the function to work for the deceased, stick shabtis were always found in the overground cult chapel of Egyptian tombs, only at Thebes. They are often placed into roughly carved model coffins. In the inscriptions on these shabtis, the names of officials appear.

It seems that stick shabtis represented family members and friends of a deceased. The stick shabtis were placed close to the burial of a beloved family member, so that the represented people could be symbolically close to their beloved one.

== Literature ==
- Paul Whelan: Mere Scraps of Rough Wood?: 17th–18th Dynasty Stick Shabtis in the Petrie Museum and Other Collections, London 2007 ISBN 978-1-906137-00-7
