= Wilhelm Spiegelberg =

German Egyptologist (1870–1930)

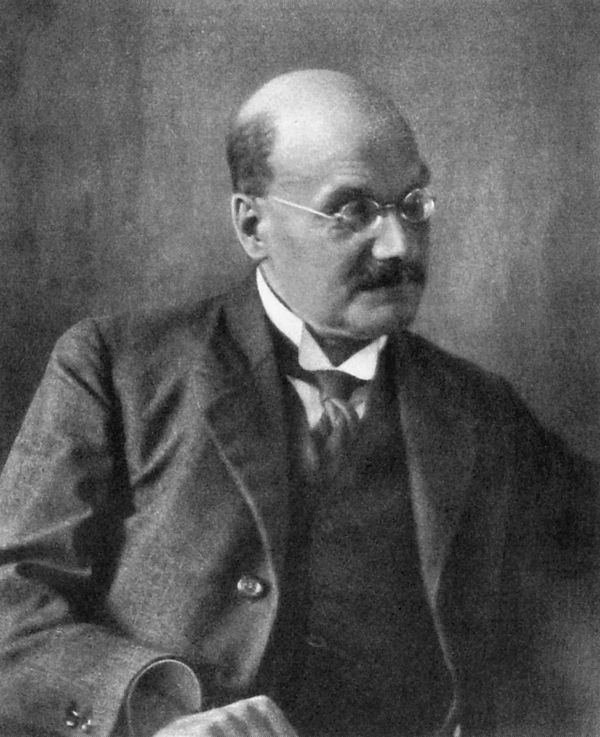
Wilhelm Spiegelberg ca. 1916/18

Wilhelm Spiegelberg (25 June 1870, Hanover – 23 December 1930, Munich) was a German Egyptologist. He specialized in analyses of Demotic and hieratic text.

Spiegelberg grew up as the second oldest of four brothers in a German Jewish family. He studied Egyptology and archaeology in Strasbourg and Berlin, obtaining his doctorate from the University of Strasbourg in 1891. As a student his influences included Johannes Dümichen, Adolf Michaelis and Adolf Erman. After graduation, he continued his education in Paris as a student of Gaston Maspero. In 1899, he became an associate professor at the University of Strasbourg, where in 1907 he obtained a full professorship. In 1919, he relocated to Heidelberg University, and four years later succeeded Friedrich Wilhelm von Bissing as chair of Egyptology at the Ludwig-Maximilians-Universität München.

Starting in 1894, he took part in excavator work in Egypt, most notably at the Necropolis of Thebes. Around 1900, he began work at the Egyptian Museum in Cairo, serving as a cataloger and editor of Demotic material. Spiegelberg made important contributions towards the deciphering of Demotic script and in the field of Demotic lexicography.

During his tenure at the Ludwig-Maximilians-Universität München, he accompanied novelist Thomas Mann to Egypt, where he provided assistance towards the drafting of Mann's Joseph tetralogy. In 1919, he became a member of the Heidelberg Academy of Sciences (a non-resident member since 1923), and from 1924, was a full member of the Bavarian Academy of Sciences.

== Selected works ==
- Studien und Materialien zum Rechtswesen des Pharaonenreiches der Dynastien XVIII–XXI, Hannover 1892 (dissertation) – Studies on the law of the Pharaohs of the dynasties XVIII–XXI.
- Geschichte der ägyptische Kunst bis zum Hellenismus, 1903 – History of Egyptian art up until the Hellenistic period.
- Der Aufenthalt Israels in Aegypten im Lichte der aegyptischen Monumente, 1904.
- Elephantine-Papyri, 1907 (with Otto Rubensohn; Wilhelm Schubart) – Elephantine papyri.
- Die Schrift und Sprache der alten Ägypter, 1907 – The script and language of the ancient Egyptians.
- Koptisches Handwörterbuch, 1921 – Coptic pocket dictionary.
- Demotische Papyri, Heidelberg 1923 – Demotic papyri.
- Demotische grammatik, 1925 – Demotic grammatics.

== Internal links ==
Merneptah Stele
