= Padiamenope =

Ancient Egyptian royal scribe

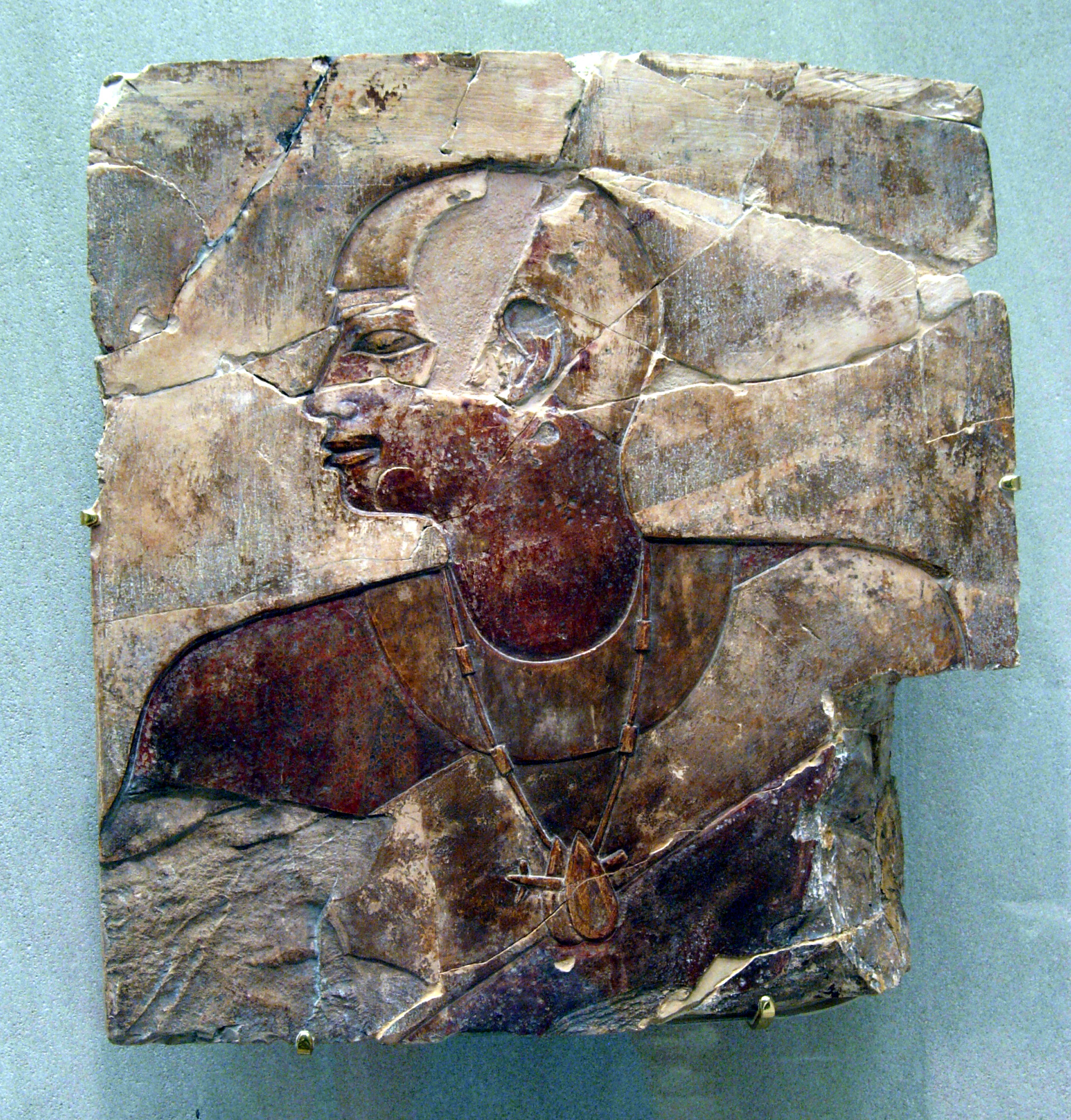
- Sunk relief believed to depict Padiamenope, now at the MET Museum.
Egyptian name
Q3 D37 M17 Y5 N35 M17 O45 X1
- Dynasty: late 25th – early 26th Dynasty
- Burial: TT33, el-Assasif, Theban Necropolis

Padiamenope (also known by the hellenised form Petamenophis) was an ancient Egyptian royal scribe and chief lector priest between the late 25th Dynasty and the early 26th Dynasty, known mainly for his immense tomb, one of the largest ever built in ancient Egypt.

== Biography ==
Despite his immense tomb and the quantity of known artifacts attributable to him, nearly nothing is known of Padiamenope's life. His titles provide only vague hints about his career, with none of these seemingly referring to any political charge. Notably, the name of the pharaoh (or pharaohs) he must have served does not appear in any of his numerous inscriptions; it has been estimated that he should have lived between the late 25th and the 26th Dynasty.

He was a "chief of the scribes of the king’s documents", but also held priestly positions such as chief ritualist priest, as well as liturgical scribe both at Thebes and Abydos. From his titles and the text written on the walls of his tomb, it has been deduced that he must have had an exceptional knowledge of both royal and sacred texts.
The tomb inscriptions also mention his mother and many maternal family members, while members of the paternal side are absent altogether; it has therefore been suggested that he may have been of Kushite origin, given the typically matrilineal tradition of that society.

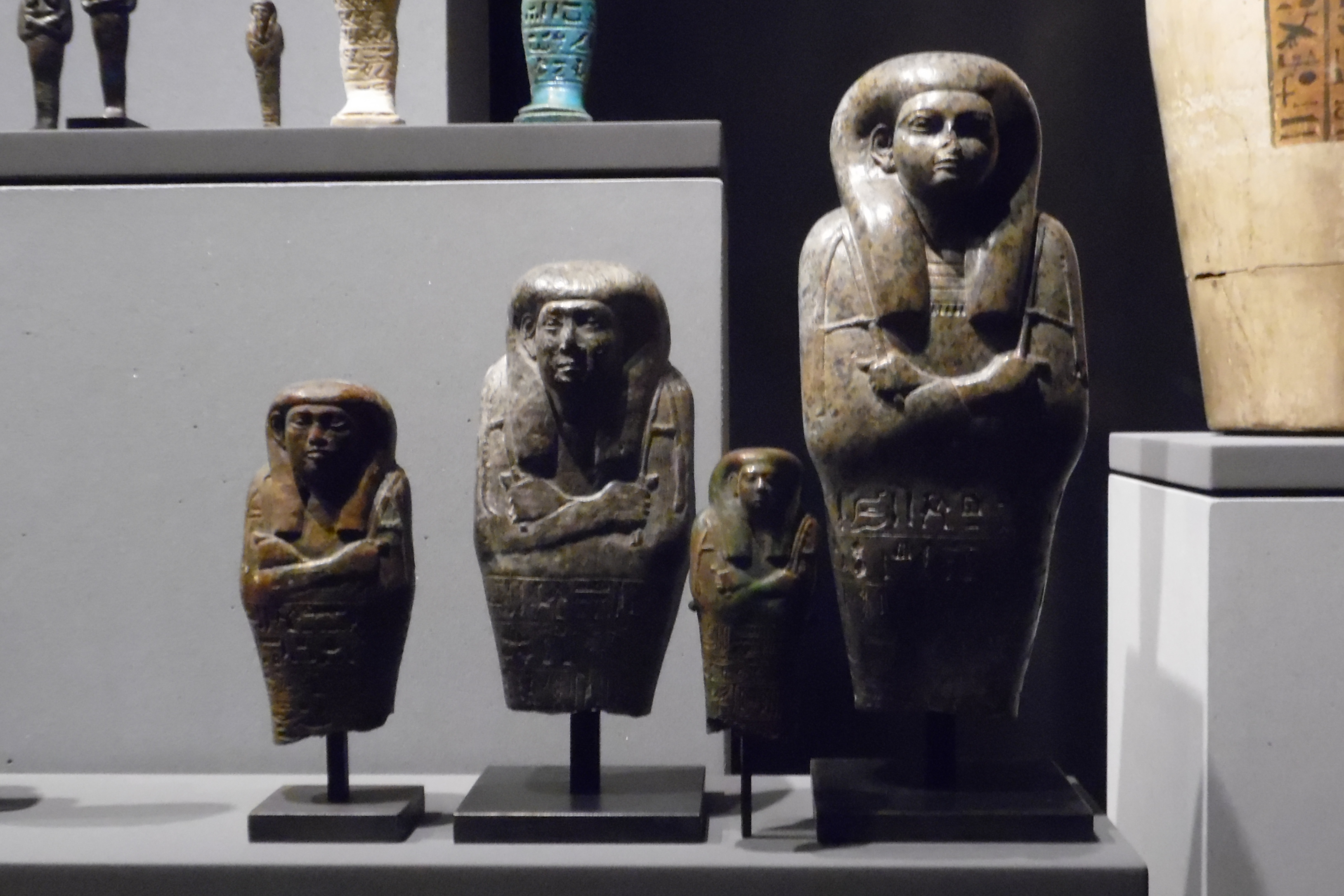
Padiamenmope's ushabtis, Staatliches Museum Ägyptischer Kunst, Munich

A quartzite statue of him, found at Karnak, is now at the Cairo Egyptian Museum. Another statue, on which he bears the title of "Scribe of the Temple of Abydos", is now in Syracuse.
Several ushabti belonging to Padiamenope are known; all of these are broken, presumably for some magical reason.

== Tomb ==
Ushabtis of Pediamenope. Museo Egizio, Turin.

Padiamenope's tomb TT33, located at el-Assasif on the west bank of the Nile, is the largest non-royal tomb in the whole Theban Necropolis, as well as one of the largest ever built in Egypt. It consists of 22 rooms, spread over four underground levels, whose walls offer over 2600m^{2} of decorations, although not always well preserved. Notably, the wall inscriptions show a collection of ancient funerary texts such as the Book of Gates, but revisited in simpler and more contemporary terms.

The tomb was discovered in the 18th century and was initially kept open, but remained closed for the entire 20th century. During 2004–2005, a team led by Claude Traunecker of the University of Strasbourg undertook a systematic exploration of the tomb.
