= TT387 =

Theban tomb

Theban tomb TT387
- Burial site of Meryptah
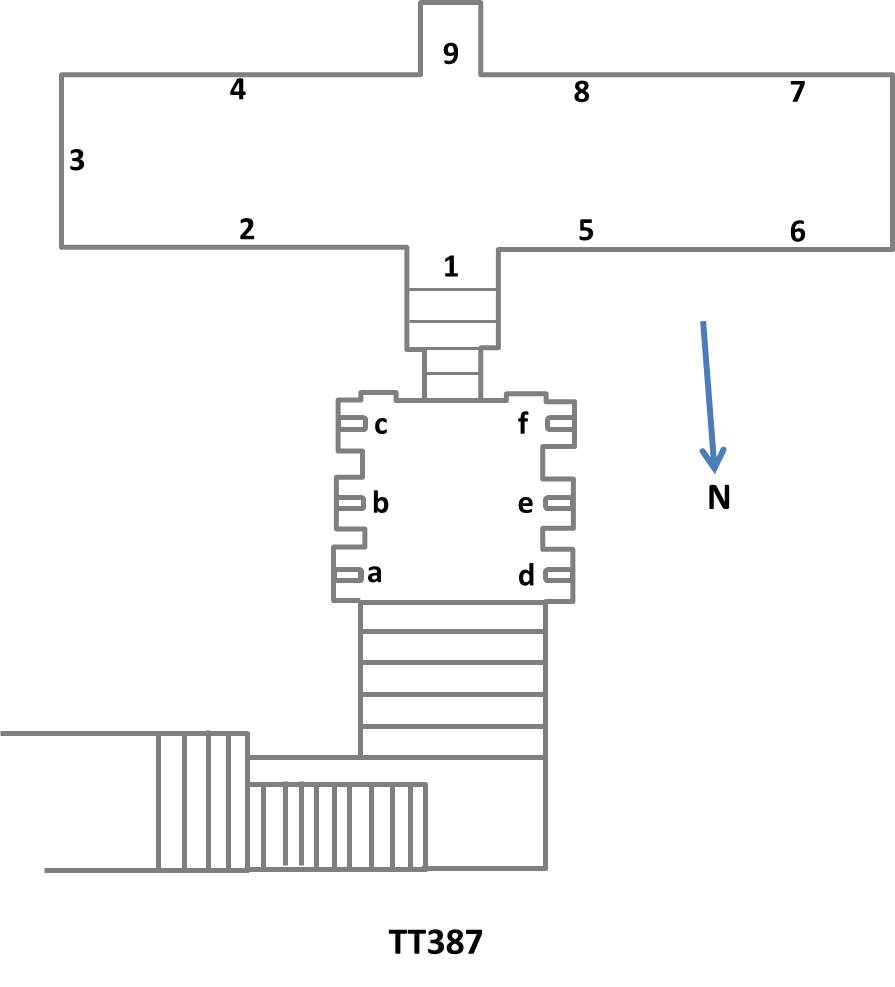

- Location within Egypt
- Location: El-Assasif, Theban Necropolis
- ← Previous; TT386 Next → TT388

p t V28 mr i i
Meryptah
in hieroglyphs
Era: New Kingdom
(1550–1069 BC)

The Theban Tomb TT387 is located in El-Assasif, part of the Theban Necropolis, on the west bank of the Nile, opposite to Luxor. It is the burial place of Meryptah, the royal scribe of the table of the Lord of the Two Lands, and the Governor of the Desert Lands for the Southern Deserts. His wife is a Lady of the House and a Chantress of Amun. Her name is Nebkhentu.

The tomb consists of a set of stairs leading to a court. This court was decorated with Osiride Royal statues, a statue of Osiris and of a Hathor-cow protecting the King. A second set of stairs leads to a hall. The walls are decorated with scenes from the Book of Gates, offering scenes, and a scene with a tree goddess.

== See also ==
- List of Theban tombs
