= TT33 (tomb) =

Ancient Egyptian tomb

Coordinates: 25.7346°N 32.6122°E

Theban tomb TT33
- Burial site of Padiamenope
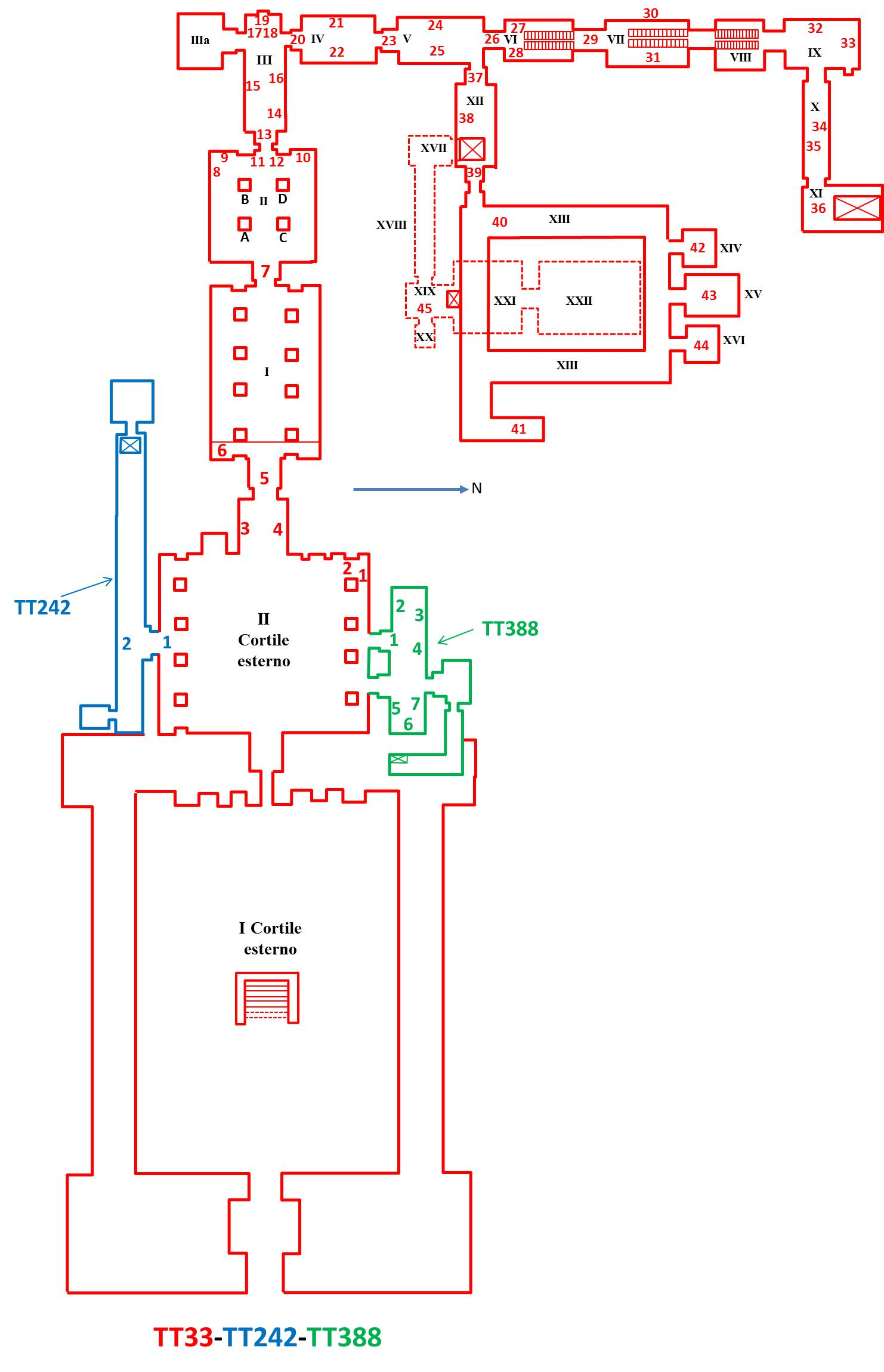

- Location within Egypt
- Location: El-Assasif, Theban Necropolis
- Discovered: Prior to 1737
- ← Previous; TT32 Next → TT34

p D37 i mn n i O45 t
Pediamenopet
in hieroglyphs
Era: New Kingdom
(1550–1069 BC)

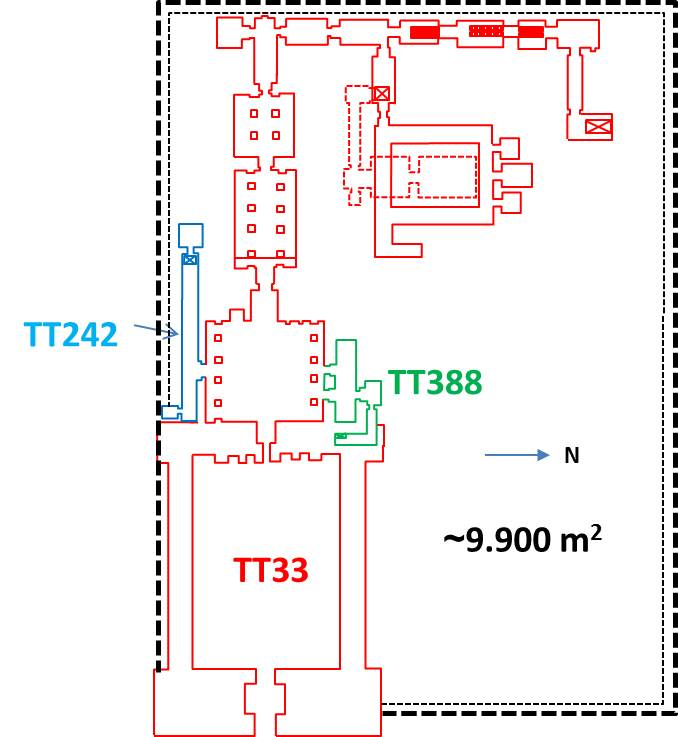
Floor plan of the area of TT33, TT242, TT388

The Theban Tomb TT33 is an ancient Egyptian tomb. Located in El-Assasif, it is part of the Theban Necropolis on the west bank of the Nile, opposite to Luxor. The tomb is the burial place of the ancient Egyptian Padiamenope, who was Prophet and Chief Lector Priest during the 26th Dynasty.

Although it was open when Richard Pocoke visited the area in 1737 (he thought it was a subterranean palace) it was more fully examined and excavated in 1881 by Johannes Dümichen from the University of Strasbourg. Located not far from Deir el-Bahari, it is larger than most of the more famous pharaohs' tombs that are found in the necropolis. It is composed of twenty-two rooms connected by long corridors and distributed on three levels extending twenty metres below the level of the ground.

The tomb owner served one or more pharaohs during the 25th to 26th Dynasty time period, and amassed enough wealth and power to build a labyrinthine tomb covered with hundreds of metres of frescoes and hieroglyphs.

The tomb was and still remains the largest known non-royal site in the necropolis as of 2008. TT33 consists of 22 rooms, reached by flights of steps, ramps and vertical shafts.

During 2004–2005, a joint team from the IFAO (French Institute of Oriental Archaeology, Cairo, Egypt) and the University of Strasbourg explored the chambers of the huge tomb. The official reopening was attended by notable officials from Egypt's Supreme Council of Antiquities and other archaeologists working in the area. Further planned work will concentrate on the cleaning, restoration and conservation of the tomb, which has been engraved with many important texts, such as Pyramid Texts, the Book of the Dead or the Great Netherworld Books (e.g. Amduat, Book of Gates and Book of Caverns.) The French Epigraphical Mission in Tomb TT 33 copies and edits the texts of the monument. It is directed by Claude Traunecker (University of Strasbourg) and Isabelle Régen (University of Montpellier 3 -\– Paul Valéry) (co-director).

Since 2018, the works of the French Archaeological Mission in Asasif (IFAO, University of Strasbourg, CNRS, under the supervision of the Egyptian Ministry of Tourism and Antiquities) revealed a significant archaeological deposit from the early 18th dynasty inside the enclosure of Padiamenope (TT 33). For example, in November of that year, 1000 ushabtis and an intact sarcophagus of a female mummy called Thuya were discovered, the latter dating to the 18th Dynasty.

In October 2019, the Ministry of Antiquities announced the discovery of 30 mummies found within the vicinity of the tomb. The mummy cache consists of 23 adult males, 5 adult females, and 2 children, all of whom are assumed to be connected to Theban priesthood. The coffins were stacked on top of each other and upon opening, the mummies were found to be well preserved with their wrappings intact. Mostafa Waziri, general secretary of Supreme Council of Antiquities, stated that the tomb is the largest cache found in a century, with previous noteworthy caches being DB320, KV35, and Bab el-Gasus.

Ushabti of Pediamenopet. Museo Egizio, Turin.

== See also ==
- List of Theban tombs
