= Claude Traunecker =

French Egyptologist and professor

- Born: 1943 (age 82–83); Mulhouse, France
- Occupations: Egyptologist, professor, researcher
- Employer(s): University of Strasbourg, CNRS
- Known for: Research on ancient Egypt, excavations at Karnak and Luxor, studies of TT33
- Notable work: The Gods of Egypt; Karnak: résurrection d'un site

Claude Traunecker (born 1943) is a French Egyptologist, professor at the University of Strasbourg and researcher at the CNRS. He has participated in numerous archaeological excavations and research on ancient Egypt.

From 1968 to 1984, Traunecker worked in Franco-Egyptian Center for the Study of Temples Karnak and Luxor. He published research in the journal Cahiers de Karnak. Claude Traunecker taught at the École du Louvre from 1985 to 1995. He was then a professor at the University of Louvain. In 1996, he was elected chair of Egyptology at the University of Strasbourg, a position he held until 2007.

During the excavation campaign of 2004–2005, he explored the many rooms of the Theban tomb TT33. Traunecker has authored many books and papers. He is the author of The Gods of Egypt, and in 1984 he published Karnak: résurrection d'un site with Jean-Claude Golvin.
