= Glossary of history =

This glossary of history is a list of definitions of terms and concepts relevant to the study of history and its related fields and sub-disciplines, including both prehistory and the period of human history.

== A ==
ab urbe condita (AUC)
absolute monarchy
A system of government headed by a monarch as the only source of power, controlling all functions of the state.
abstract
A summary of a textual source.
access rights
Information about who can access the resource or an indication of its security status.
accrual method
The method by which items are added to a collection.
accrual periodicity
The frequency with which items are added to a collection.
accrual policy
The policy governing the addition of items to a collection.
administrative history
A subdiscipline of historiography which studies the history of state administrations and bureaucracies, focusing especially on changes in administrative ideology and legal codes over time as well as the role of civil servants and the relationship between government and society.
aeon

age
Age of Discovery

The time period between approximately the late 15th century and the 17th century during which seafarers from various European polities traveled to, explored, and charted regions across the globe which had previously been unknown or unfamiliar to Europeans and, more broadly, during which previously isolated human populations became socially, politically, and/or economically aware of and connected to each other. These explorations, often commissioned and funded by state governments, were spurred by advances in cartography and maritime technology at the beginning of the early modern period, especially the introduction of sailing vessels capable of enduring extremely long trans-oceanic voyages, and so the Age of Discovery largely overlaps with the Age of Sail. The period is also associated with the emergence of colonialism and imperialism as practiced by European monarchies, particularly the colonization of the Americas and the establishment of oceanic trade routes to India and Southeast Asia, which are sometimes identified with the origins of the global economy and of globalization, as well as the exchange, intentional and unintentional, of plants, animals, diseases, technologies, and ideas between previously isolated parts of the world.
Age of Enlightenment
agent provocateur
A person who goes undercover in the ranks of the enemy during a social or political conflict with the intention of damaging or compromising the enemy from within by provoking actions that might not otherwise have taken place. Agents provocateurs have sometimes been employed by governments or businesses to provoke armed clashes between groups, to create disorder, or to incite controversies which might be used as an excuse for war or foreign intervention.
Alltagsgeschichte
alternate modernity
In postcolonialism and development studies, the theory that different parts of the world experienced the onset of modernity at different times and in their own fashion, such that to people living in certain places "modernity" means something quite specific and distinct from that experienced elsewhere.
anachronism
A chronological inconsistency, in particular the introduction of an object, linguistic term, technology, idea, or anything else into a period in time to which it does not belong.
ancient history

Annales school
A style of historiography linked to the French scholarly journal Annales d'histoire économique et sociale and broadly associated with the social history of cultural practices.
annals
Historical accounts of facts and events arranged in chronological order, year by year. The term is also used more loosely to describe any historical record.
Anno Domini (AD)
anthropology
The study of humanity, culturally and physically, in all times and places.
antiquarian

A historian who studies antiquities or things of the past, often with particular attention to artifacts, archives, manuscripts, or archaeological sites from ancient history, as opposed to more recent history. In a broader sense, an antiquarian may also be a person who is simply a collector or aficionado of such artifacts and not necessarily a professional historian.
antiquarianism
Historical study focusing on the empirical evidence of the past, including manuscripts and archives, and archaeological and historic sites and artifacts. The term is now often used in a pejorative sense to refer to an excessively narrow interest in historical trivia, to the exclusion of a sense of historical context or process.
antiquities
Objects or artifacts from ancient history, especially from the Classical civilizations and cultures of the Mediterranean region and the ancient Near East.
antiquity
See ancient history and Classical antiquity.
archaeology
The study of human history and prehistory through the excavation of sites and the analysis of physical remains.
architectural history
The study of buildings in their historical and stylistic contexts.
archival bond
The relationship that each archival record has with other records produced as part of the same transaction or activity and located within the same group.
archival research
archival science
The study and theory of building and curating archives.
archive
An accumulation of historical documents and records, or the physical repository in which they are located.
archontology
The study of historical offices and important positions in state, international, political, religious, and other organizations and societies, including chronologies, succession of officeholders, their biographies, and related records.
armiger
A person entitled to bear a coat of arms; more broadly, a gentleman or an esquire.
armory
The study of coats of armorial bearings; another name for heraldry.
arrested decay
A state or condition in which certain historic sites are preserved, where little or no significant restoration or renovation work is performed in modern times except that which is necessary to maintain basic structural integrity and prevent total deterioration of historical objects. The concept is often contrasted with conservation efforts which attempt to preserve or improve buildings or artifacts by deliberately applying techniques which may dramatically alter their appearance or material properties, particularly when these efforts are perceived as damaging their intrinsic historical value. The term is used especially when referring to immovable cultural property such as historic buildings and places such as ghost towns which have remained largely unchanged since they were last occupied, with neither demolition nor re-development having significantly altered them in the intervening time, as well as places which have been extensively damaged but which for various reasons it is undesirable or impossible to restore, such as the ruins of ancient civilizations or of battlefields intended to serve as war memorials.
art history
The study of objects of art in their historical and stylistic contexts.
artifact

Any material object associated with a culture, such as a tool, an article of clothing, or a prepared food item.
audience
A class of entity, often a specific demographic, for whom a given resource is intended or useful.
authorized biography
autobiography
An individual's account of his or her own life.
auxiliary sciences of history

The set of specialist scholarly disciplines which help evaluate and use historical sources and are often used to support historical research. These disciplines may include but are not limited to archaeology, archival science, philology, genealogy, numismatics, philately, and heraldry.
Avalonia
A separate plate in the Early Paleozoic consisting of much of what is now Northern Europe, Newfoundland, Nova Scotia, and some coastal parts of New England.

== B ==
Baltica
A separate continental plate of the Early Paleozoic composed of what is now the United Kingdom, Scandinavia, European Russia and Central Europe. It is named for the Baltic Sea.
barbarian
A Greek word adopted by the Romans to refer to any people who did not adopt the Roman way of life. It is said to have come originally from the sound "bar-bar", which, according to the Greeks, was supposed to be the noise that people made when speaking foreign languages.
Before Christ (BC)
Before the Common Era (BCE)
Bering Land Bridge

The vast tundra plain that was exposed as a land bridge between the continents of Asia and North America during the Last Glacial Maximum, about 21,000 years ago. It is theorized to have served as a migration route for people, animals, and plants for several thousand years before being once again submerged beneath rising sea levels.
bibliography
A list of written works, including books, journals, and essays, about or detailing a particular subject.
Big History
big lie
biography
An account of an individual's life, especially one written by someone other than the individual featured in the account.
Black Legend
Blitzkrieg
German for "lightning war". A military strategy used by the German Army at the beginning of World War II to achieve victory through a series of quick offensives, especially in Belgium, the Netherlands and France. The strategy involved a heavy initial bombardment, followed by the rapid mobilisation of armour and motorised infantry to break the weakest parts of the enemy line.
Bolsheviks
A small, tightly organised, revolutionary Marxist group in early 20th-century Russia which split from the Russian Socialist movement in 1903 and was led by Vladimir Lenin. In November 1917, during the so-called October Revolution, the Bolsheviks ("Majority") took control of a chaotic Russia, becoming the de facto rulers after the subsequent civil war. They then renamed themselves the Communist Party of the Soviet Union (CPSU).
book review
A critical examination of a text, usually including a summary of the work and opposing views.
bottom-up approach
An approach to historical scholarship that attempts to explain the experiences or perspectives of ordinary people, as opposed to elites or leaders. Contrast top-down approach.
bourgeoisie
The capitalist class that came to be known as the middle class, between the aristocracy and the working class. A new middle class of merchants and businessmen prospered throughout Europe from the 16th century, and especially in Britain, which Napoleon described as a "nation of shopkeepers". In modern times, the term bourgeois is often used derogatorily to describe anything considered humdrum, unimaginative and/or selfishly materialistic.
Bronze Age
In Britain, a period from about 2300 to 700 BCE when metal first began to be widely used, possibly as a result of the increase in contact with mainland Europe. However, various types of stone, particularly flint, remained very important long after metal became available. The Bronze Age saw the introduction of cremation of the dead and burials in round barrows. The later (and best-known) phases of construction at Stonehenge also date from this period.
Buranji
Written chronicles of Ahoms, a medieval kingdom of Assam, India.

== C ==
Caesar
A Roman family name best known for being used by several rulers of Ancient Rome. Contrary to popular opinion, the name "Caesar" did not originally mean "emperor", although in modern times it has come to be defined as a synonym for autocrat. When the Roman leader Gaius Julius Caesar was assassinated in 44 BCE, his nephew and successor Augustus had himself formally adopted by the dead man and so also adopted the family name Caesar. Tiberius and Caligula inherited it by adoption as well. Later Roman emperors acquired the name upon their succession or when they were formally adopted as heirs.
calendar
A descriptive list of archival documents, sometimes compiled in sufficient detail that it can be used as a substitute for the originals.
cartulary
A register of lands and privileges granted by charter, occasionally recorded on a roll of paper but more often in book form.
Cathaysian Terranes
A set of small landmasses that developed in tropical to subtropical latitudes on the eastern side of Pangaea during the Permian and Triassic, comprising what is now North China (Sino-Korea), South China (Yangtze), Eastern Qiangtang, Tarim, and Indochina.
century
A period of 100 years. Centuries are numbered ordinally (e.g. 15th, 16th, 17th) in English and many other languages.
chancery
charge
A heraldic device emblazoned on the face of a shield.
charter
A legal grant of authority or rights.
chirograph
1. An historical record that has been torn or cut into two pieces, sometimes with writing across the division, such that each piece serves to authenticate the other by exactly matching with it; an indenture.
2. Any handwritten document.
chorography
The geographical description of regions, often with reference to their history and antiquities.
chronicle
A historical account of facts and events arranged in chronological order.
chronology
The study of the sequence of past events.
classical antiquity

The period of cultural history between the 8th century BC and the 6th century AD in the geographical area centered on the Mediterranean Sea, particularly relating to the contemporaneous civilizations of ancient Greece and ancient Rome, known as the Greco-Roman world, which flourished and wielded enormous influence across much of Europe, North Africa, and Western Asia during this time. Though its boundaries are imprecise, the classical period is traditionally considered to have begun with the earliest writings of the Greek poet Homer and ended with the fall of the Western Roman Empire and the decline of classical culture during Late antiquity and the Early Middle Ages.
Cimmerian Terranes

An archipelago of small landmasses that developed in tropical and subtropical latitudes on the eastern side of Pangaea during the Triassic. Blocks that comprised it include what is now Turkey, Iran, Afghanistan, Tibet, and Malaysia.
circa

Approximately, about, around; near or in the vicinity of. A Latin term signifying approximation or uncertainty, usually by immediately preceding a date or a numerical measure. Circa is widely used in historical writing and genealogy when the dates of events are not accurately known. When used with date ranges, it or its abbreviation is applied before each approximate date, while dates without circa preceding them are generally assumed to be known with certainty.
citation
A reference to a published or unpublished source for an assertion or argument.
classical tradition
classics

The study of classical antiquity, in particular of Ancient Greek and Latin literature and their respective languages, and traditionally also Greco-Roman art, philosophy, history, mythology, and society.
cliodynamics
cliometrics
The systematic application of economic theory, econometric techniques, and other formal or mathematical methods to the study of history; a quantitative economic history.
codex

A book constructed of a number of sheets of paper, vellum, papyrus, parchment, or similar materials, especially a manuscript book with handwritten contents and formatted so that individual pages are stacked and fixed to a spine along one edge.
codicology
The study of codices or manuscript books as physical objects, specifically the materials and techniques used to make books, including writing surfaces (such as parchment or vellum), pigments, inks, bindings, handwriting, marginalia, glosses, and so on.
coherence theory of truth
A theory that regards statements as true if they are coherent within some specified set of sentences, propositions, or beliefs.
Cold War
colonialism
The practice or policy by which one people or sovereignty exerts social, political, and/or economic control over other people or geographic areas, typically by establishing a colony whose administration is distinct from that of the colonizers' home territory and generally with the aim of economic dominance. The foreign administrators rule the colony in pursuit of their own interests, often imposing their language, religion, and culture upon the colonized region while seeking to benefit from the exploitation of its people and resources. Colonialism is often associated with though is distinct from imperialism.
Common Era (CE)
comparative history
The comparison of different societies which existed during the same time period or shared similar cultural conditions.
computational history
Congo craton
A separate continental plate that rifted from the supercontinent Rodinia in the Late Precambrian. It contained a large part of what is now north-central Africa.
conjectural history
conjectural portrait
context
In archaeology, a discrete physical location, distinguishable from other contexts, which forms one of the units making up an overall archaeological site. The context in which an artifact is found provides important evidence for its interpretation.
correspondence theory of truth
A theory that regards statements as true if they correspond to the world that we know by perception.
counterfactual history
A form of historiography that seeks to explore history by extrapolating a timeline in which key events happened in ways other than the ways in which they did in fact occur.
Cretaceous Western Interior Seaway

The epicontinental sea that formed as marine waters from the north spread over North America from around 130 to 70 million years ago (Ma). At its peak in the Middle Cretaceous (~90 Ma), it extended from present-day Utah to the Appalachians and from the Arctic to the Gulf of Mexico.
cryptohistory
cultural history
The academic study of the origins and history of the culture and cultural practices (e.g. music, theater, literature, fine art) of a particular group of people.
culture

== D ==
Dark Ages
date
A specific point or period of time.
deep history
The study of the distant past of the human species, i.e. the earliest parts of human prehistory, or any other aspect of the time period during which the earliest humans existed (with "humans" usually meaning anatomically modern humans, as opposed to earlier hominid species). Deep history incorporates a wide range of methods from disciplines such as archaeology, primatology, anthropology, genetics, evolutionary biology, and linguistics with the goal of assembling a common narrative about the origins and evolution of human populations prior to the beginning of recorded history, and also of correcting a perceived scholarly bias towards the study of more recent historical periods.
demographic history
digital history
The use of digital media in the academic study of history, in order to aid historical analysis, research, or presentation, including digital archives, data visualizations, interactive maps and timelines, audio files, virtual representations of historical periods and places, etc., often in an online format. See also computational history.
diplomatics
The study and textual analysis of historical documents.
discipline
The study, or practice, of a specific subject using a specific set of methods, terms and approaches. History is a discipline, as is archaeology, chemistry, and biology.
dominant narrative
dossier
A group of documents deliberately assembled to provide information about a specific topic. The term often connotes information that has been purposefully collected from various sources, as opposed to documents that exist in an organic collection originating from a single source or resulting from routine activities.
dynasty

== E ==
early modern period
eclogue
economic determinism
The socioeconomic theory that economic relationships have been the main or sole driving force in all of human history.
economic history
The study of economies or economic phenomena of the past.
Edwardian
1. The period of British history that spanned the reign of King Edward VII (1901–1910), or more generally the period between the turn of the 20th century and the outbreak of the First World War in August 1914.
2. Of or related to this period; an adjective used to describe any person, object, event, idea, or concept characterizing or associated with the Edwardian era, either by having originated or flourished during the period or by retrospectively coming to represent it, especially in the United Kingdom but more broadly in any part of the British Empire.
effect of reality
Elizabethan
1. The period of English history that spanned the reign of Elizabeth I, Queen of England and Ireland (1558–1603). Elizabeth was the last monarch of the Tudor period, and the Elizabethan era is often depicted as a golden age in English history, an age of economic growth, naval supremacy, and national pride.
2. Of or related to this period; an adjective used to describe any person, object, event, idea, or concept characterizing or associated with the Elizabethan era, either by having originated or flourished during the period or by retrospectively coming to represent it.
empire
A type of sovereign state made up of multiple territories and peoples subject to a single and supreme ruling authority, often an emperor or empress. Empires can be composed exclusively of contiguous territories, e.g. the Russian Empire, or may include territories which are remote from the empire's home territory or metropole, as with a colonial empire. The concept of an empire is often associated with the concept of imperialism, though the latter also refers to a political policy or ideology that is not necessarily practiced by empires and can apply to many other forms of government.
end of history
Enlightenment
A cultural and intellectual movement of the late 17th to late 18th centuries that emphasized reason and individualism rather than faith and tradition, predominantly among Western European cultures but also in other parts of the world; or the time period itself during which this movement flourished.
environmental history
An approach to history that examines how nature and natural processes (i.e. plants, animals, geology, etc.) have shaped human agency and affairs, and conversely how humans have shaped nature.
eon
See aeon.
epigraphy
The study of ancient inscriptions.
episteme
The dominant mode of knowledge or understanding of a particular era, common to many or all forms of knowledge produced at the time.
epoch
An instant in time chosen (sometimes arbitrarily) as the origin or beginning of a particular calendar era, thereby serving as a reference point from which time is measured and by which historical events are temporally related.
era
Any span of time defined for the purposes of chronology or historiography. In chronology, an era is the highest level of organization for the measurement of time, as used in defining calendar eras for a given calendar and regnal eras in the history of a monarchy. The term is also used in geologic time, where an era is a subdivision of an aeon.
essentialize
To assume the existence of an inner "essence" or an essential character shared by all of the members of a group which in reality is diverse, variable, and fluid.
ethnohistory
A branch of history or an approach to historical scholarship which addresses the history of the native peoples of a particular place or region, in particular the indigenous peoples of the Americas. Ethnohistory is an interdisciplinary approach that often supplements written historical documents with methods from anthropology, folklore, oral history, and archaeology.
euhemerism
In mythology, the presumption that mythological accounts were based on or originated from real historical events or persons, having accumulated elaborations and exaggerations over many generations of retelling until reaching their present form.
Euramerica
A supercontinent that existed in the Late Silurian through Devonian, formed by the collision of Baltica, Laurentia, and Avalonia. It included what is now North America, Greenland, Scandinavia, and Europe. It is also sometimes referred to as the “Old Red Continent” for the red color of its oxidized deposits.
Eurocentrism
A worldview that is centered on Western civilization or Western culture, particularly that originating in or associated with Western Europe, to the exclusion of or in a way that is biased against non-Western cultures. The term may also apply to the whole continent of Europe or beyond to countries and cultures whose histories are strongly tied to Western Europe by immigration, colonization, or influence.

== F ==
fakelore

Inauthentic, manufactured folklore that is presented as if it were genuinely traditional. Compare invented tradition.
farm book
feudalism
The legal and social order prevailing through much of medieval Europe, in which society was structured around a set of reciprocal legal and military obligations.
fin de siècle
floruit (fl.)
Denoting a date or period during which a particular person or group is known to have been alive or active, or to which their works or contributions are dated (i.e. when they "flourished"), used especially when a person's dates of birth and death are not precisely known.
folklore
The expressive body of culture shared by a particular group of people, encompassing the oral traditions (e.g. tales, proverbs, and jokes) and the material culture as well as the customs, lore, folk beliefs, rituals, celebrations and ceremonies, holidays, and initiation rites practiced by that group, and in particular those cultural elements which are transmitted informally from one individual to another and from one generation to the next either through verbal instruction or demonstration.
fonds
In archival science, an aggregation of documents which all originate from the same source.
foreign domination

== G ==
genealogy
The study of family relationships.
geological time
golden age
Gondwana
A supercontinent that existed from the Cambrian to Jurassic, mainly composed of what is now South America, Africa, Madagascar, India, Antarctica, and Australia.
great man theory
Gregorian calendar

== H ==
hagiography
A biography of a saint or saints, or more broadly any biography in which the author is uncritical or reverential towards the subject.
hegemony
The political, economic, military, and/or cultural predominance of one state over other states, or more generally of any group or regime which exerts undue influence within a society.
heraldic badge
heraldry
The design, display, and study of armorial bearings and devices, often practiced together with the study of ceremony, rank, and pedigree.
heritage tourism
Tourism involving the exploration and appreciation of the cultural, historical, or environmental heritage of a particular place or a particular group of people. The term encompasses both tangible and intangible aspects of history, including historic sites, monuments, and artifacts as well as the traditions, customs, and practices associated with a particular culture or historical period.
hermeneutics
The theory and methodology of the interpretation of texts.
histoinformatics
histoire des mentalités
An approach to social or cultural history which attempts to describe and analyze the ways in which historical people thought about, interacted with, and classified the world around them, i.e. the mentalities, perspectives, or modes of thought through which they interpreted historical events as well as their own lives. This methodology thus aims to understand the psychology of people who lived in the past. It is often associated with the Annales school of historiography and with microhistory.
histoire totale
historian
A scholar who studies or writes about history.
historian's fallacy
historic preservation
historic recurrence
historic site
historical anthropology
historical classification
historical demography
The quantitative study of human populations of the past, concerned with measuring or estimating population size, fertility, mortality, migration, and other demographic characteristics. Sources for this information can differ greatly by the time and place being studied, from formal censuses and administrative and ecclesiastical records to archaeological inferences.
historical materialism
A branch of Marxism which takes the position that the development of history is not determined by the subjective desires or actions of specific human beings but is instead shaped by the objective facts of material existence. It sees human history unfolding as a consequence of humans attempting to alter the natural environment to suit their particular biological needs.
historical method
The collection of techniques and guidelines that historians use to research and write histories of the past. The historical method involves the historian identifying and drawing upon primary sources, secondary sources, and material evidence such as that derived from archaeology, evaluating the relative authority of these sources, and then combining their testimony appropriately in order to construct an accurate and reliable picture of past events and environments.
historical metrology
historical negationism
Falsification or distortion of the historical record, especially by the practice of denialism. The term is sometimes used interchangeably with historical revisionism but may also be considered technically distinct, in that the latter can be applied to newly evidenced, fairly reasoned reinterpretations of history. Historical negationism, by contrast, is always illegitimate in its attempts to revise the past because it is practiced without impartiality or because it uses techniques that are inadmissible in proper academic discourse, such as presenting known forgeries as if they were genuine, inventing implausible reasons for distrusting genuine historical documents, and manipulating statistical figures to support a particular point of view.
historical realism
The view that there is a continuity and correspondence between the real world and the narration of that world in historians' narratives.
historical record
Any documented, authenticated account, chronicle, or collection of information that provides evidence of past events, people, or time periods, particularly primary sources such as written documents, archival records, photographs, and artifacts but not excluding other types of historical evidence such as maps, illustrations, audio or video recordings, digital files, and ephemera, and especially those that are retained and preserved for permanent study due to their continuing value to researchers and historians. Colloquially, the term may also be used to refer to the complete body of such evidence considered collectively.
historical reenactment
historical revisionism
historical significance
historical society
An organization dedicated to preserving and promoting interest in the history of a particular place, time period, or subject, or of the study of history in general.
historical source
historical thinking
The practice of critical thinking and literacy skills in evaluating and analyzing primary source documents in order to construct a meaningful and reliable account of the past. See also historical method.
historical value
historicism
1. A mode of historical enquiry that insists that the past must be understood on its own terms, as opposed to trying to understand it from the perspectives permitted by modern knowledge, values, and beliefs, known as presentism.
2. A determinist philosophy of history which holds that the course of historical events is governed by discoverable laws or by some overarching theme or pattern to which historical trends must invariably adhere, permitting historians to predict the likely direction in which future events will unfold, generally by assuming that the trends of past events will recur in a predictable sequence or manner.
historicity
The historical actuality or authenticity of persons or events in the past; the quality of being part of history instead of being a myth, legend, or fiction. The historicity of a claim about the past is its factual status.
historiography
1. The study of the methods, sources, and theoretical approaches used by historians in developing history as an academic discipline.
2. A body of historical work on a particular topic.
3. The history of historical writing about a particular topic.
historism
history
The study of the past as it is described in written documents; events occurring before written record are generally considered prehistory. The term is also commonly used to refer to any set of events which happened earlier in time, written or otherwise. History in academic study is considered the product of our attempts to understand the past, rather than the past itself. History relates to past events as well as the memory, discovery, collection, organization, presentation, and interpretation of information about these events.
history from below
See people's history.
history of science
homily
human history
1. The complete narrative of humanity's past, generally as reckoned from the emergence of anatomically modern humans c. 300,000 years ago to the present day (though sometimes inclusive of much earlier periods in human evolution), and thereby encompassing both prehistory and written history.
2. The scientific study of this narrative, as it is understood through archaeology, anthropology, genetics, linguistics, and since the advent of writing, from primary and secondary written sources.
humanism
An intellectual movement of the Renaissance associated with the re-discovery of classical ideas.

== I ==
Iapetus Ocean
A relatively small ocean that existed between the continents of Laurentia, Baltica, and Avalonia from the Late Precambrian to the Devonian.
illuminated manuscript
A manuscript in which the text is supplemented by the addition of decoration.
imperialism
impresa

An emblem, badge, or para-heraldic device worn by nobility in the Middle Ages, usually accompanied by a motto in Latin and painted on shields or helmets in tournaments, embroidered on clothing or on equine caparisons, or embodied in standards, brooches, paintings, tapestries, or other works of art. These emblems were meant to be expressive of the character, aspirations, and achievements of a particular person, rather than an entire family or lineage, and were often designed anew for each individual occasion.
incunabulum
A book, pamphlet, broadside, or other printed document that was produced during the earliest period of printing in Europe but prior to the widespread adoption of mass production techniques, i.e. generally in the few decades between the invention of the printing press and the year 1501. In the following decades it became increasingly common and inexpensive to print many copies of the same text, such that incunabula from the period immediately preceding the beginning of the 16th century are disproportionately rare and valuable to historians. Incunabula are printed by definition, either as block books or with movable type, and thus are distinct from manuscripts, which are handwritten.
Industrial Age
information history
interdisciplinary
The study or practice of a subject which applies the methods and approaches of several disciplines. For instance, while history, literature and archaeology are separate disciplines, they may be combined in an interdisciplinary approach.
interpretation
The ensemble of procedures by which the historian–according to personal perspective, temperament, social conditioning, and conscious choice–imposes a pattern of meaning or significance on his subject; the process of selection, arrangement, accentuation, and synthesis of historical facts that establishes the personal stamp of an individual historian on an account of the past.
interregnum

A gap or discontinuity in the rule, administration, or activity of a government, organization, or social institution, especially in the rule of a monarchical dynasty; i.e. the period of time between the end of the reign of one monarch and the beginning of the reign of the next monarch, during which a monarch belonging to a different dynasty reigned, or during which no monarch reigned. The term usually refers to the temporary dissolution, usurpation, or replacement of the ruling dynasty, or of the monarchy itself, with another dynasty or a different form of government entirely, followed by the eventual restoration of the original dynasty or government, and also generally implies a period of widespread social unrest, civil wars or wars of succession, or power vacuums in which foreign invaders come to prominence.
interwar period
In the history of the 20th century, the period between the end of World War I on 11 November 1918 and the beginning of World War II on 1 September 1939; more generally, the term may refer to the period between any two successive wars.
Iron Age

== J ==
Jacobean
journal
A scholarly periodical devoted to publishing academic writings, often related to a particular historical theme.
Julian calendar

== L ==
lacuna
A gap in a manuscript, inscription, or text.
landscape history

The study of the ways in which humanity has changed the physical appearance and landscapes of the surrounding environment in the past, and how they continue to change in the present.
late modern period
Laurasia
A supercontinent that existed from the Jurassic to Early Tertiary after splitting from Pangaea. It was composed of Laurentia, Baltica, and Avalonia (what is now North America, Scandinavia, Greenland, and Western and Central Europe), and eventually fragmented into Eurasia and North America in the Tertiary with the opening of the North Atlantic Ocean.
Laurentia
A separate continental plate that existed from the Late Precambrian to Silurian, consisting of the major part of what is now North America, northwest Ireland, Scotland, Greenland, and pieces of Norway and Russia.
legend
local history
The study of the history of a small geographical area, of a local community, or of the local incidence of broader national or international trends. If undertaken with a view to casting light on larger historical questions, local history may be regarded as a branch of microhistory.
longue durée
An approach to the study of history popularized by the French Annales School which gives priority to long-term historical processes and phenomena, concentrating on all-but-permanent or slowly evolving structures from which broad patterns and trends can be interpreted, in contrast to the more traditional focus on the lives of specific individuals and specific events that occurred at specific points in time.
lore
See folklore.

== M ==
macrohistory
The study of large, long-term trends in world history, undertaken in order to uncover ultimate patterns that cut across the more specific details of diverse historical cultures.
manuscript
Any document written by hand, as opposed to one that is printed, typed, or reproduced in some other way.
manuscriptology
The study of history and literature through the use and interpretation of handwritten documents. The term is similar to codicology but is primarily used among historians of South Asia, especially India, because many of the historical manuscripts produced there are not considered codices in the strictest sense.
microhistory
The intensive historical investigation of a small and narrow unit of research (e.g. a specific event, community, or individual person, even an object or idea), generally undertaken with a view to casting light on broader historical questions. Local history may be considered a branch of microhistory.
Middle Ages

The period in the history of Europe and the Near East lasting from approximately the 5th century to the 15th century AD, usually considered to have begun with the collapse of the Western Roman Empire c. AD 476 and to have ended with the transition to the Renaissance and the discovery of the Americas in the late 1400s. The Middle Ages can be seen as part of the broader post-classical period of world history, and as the middle of the three traditional divisions of Western history, preceded by classical antiquity and followed by the modern period. The medieval period itself is often subdivided into the Early, High, and Late Middle Ages.
migration
The movement of human beings from one place to another with the intention of settling, permanently or temporarily, at a new location. Human migrations have been defining components of the history of every settled place and a major driver of economic, cultural, and linguistic exchange between populations, so historians often emphasize the importance of studying their causes, paths, and effects.
military history
The study of the history of armed conflict and its impact on society. It may range from the study of specific military actions and engagements to the much broader examination of warfare as a political tool.
modern history

modernity
1. The state of being modern, by any of various definitions of the term.
2. The historical period defined by modern history, with various starting and ending points but sometimes inclusive of the present day (i.e. contemporary history), especially when used generically to contrast the recent or current state of human civilization with previous eras.
3. The ensemble of sociocultural norms, attitudes, practices, ideas, and beliefs associated with this period, often with an emphasis on those originating in the Renaissance, the Enlightenment, the Industrial Age, and/or the early modern period.
monograph
A piece of writing, especially a book or an essay, that is the product of detailed, specialized research, often by a single author, on a particular subject or an aspect of a subject, e.g. a specific historical phenomenon, person, place, or event.
myth
mythology
The collected body of myths shared by a culture or a group of people, or the academic study of such myths.

== N ==
narrative history
The practice of writing about history in a story-like form, using literary elements commonly found in storytelling to relate the course of actual historical events, such as a central theme or narrative arc and a final climax or resolution. Real historical figures may be presented as "characters" identifiable as protagonists or antagonists.
national memory
A form of collective memory shared by the people of a particular country or nation and defined by their common experiences, history, ethnicity, society, or culture. The idea is associated with nationalism and is an integral part of national identity.
nationalism
nationalization of history
natural history
A domain of inquiry involving organisms including animals, fungi, and plants in their natural environments which leans more towards observational than experimental methods of study.
notaphily
The study and collection of paper currency and banknotes.
numismatics
The study and collection of all forms of currency, including coins, tokens, paper money, medals, and other means of payment used to resolve debts and exchange goods.

== O ==
official history
A work of history which is sponsored, authorized, or endorsed by its subject, such as an authorized biography; or a narrative which is the accepted or conventional interpretation of historical events as formally proclaimed or endorsed by a government or institution, particularly as it is distinguished from alternative narratives or interpretations.
one-place study
A type of family history, local history, or microhistory which describes and analyzes the people or events living in or associated with a single place, such as a building, road, neighborhood, village, or community, or any other geographic area, during a particular time period. This contrasts with studies united by other themes, such as a history of a specific family lineage, whose members may have been geographically dispersed, or of specific types of events which may have occurred in more than one place.
onomastics

The study of the etymology, history, and use of proper names.
oral history
1. The collection and study of historical information obtained from individuals or families via some form of oral or verbal communication (e.g. planned interviews, public speeches, or everyday conversation, or audiotapes or videotapes of these events), as opposed to information obtained from written documents or other non-verbal sources. Oral history strives to record and preserve knowledge that cannot be obtained in other ways (e.g. stories told by people who are illiterate, or passed down by cultures who do not have a writing system), particularly from people who directly participated in or observed past events first-hand. Knowledge transmitted orally is unique in that it often shares the tacit or subconscious perspectives, thoughts, and opinions of the speaker, which might otherwise be excluded from written accounts, along with nuances particular to unplanned, off-the-cuff conversation, where the speaker has not had time to prepare their responses and is unable to change them after the fact.
2. Any information gathered in this manner, or any work of history, written or otherwise, which records transcripts of orally communicated accounts.
original order
A concept in archival theory which proposes that a group of records should be maintained in the same order as they were placed by their creator.
origo gentis
In medieval studies, the origin story of a particular person or group of people as recounted and interpreted by the person or people themselves, often detailing their chronological history, sometimes by combining actual events with myths and folklore.

== P ==
paleography

The study of historic writing systems, especially very old or ancient ones, and the deciphering, dating, and authentication of historical manuscripts, with a focus on the forms, processes, and methods of writing, in particular the analysis of handwriting, rather than the textual contents of documents.
Paleo-Tethys Ocean
A large ocean that originated between eastern Gondwana, Siberia, Kazakhstan, and Baltica in the Ordovician and finally closed in the Jurassic. It was replaced by the Tethys Ocean as eastern Pangaea was assembled.
palimpsest
Pangaea

A supercontinent that existed from the end of the Permian to the Jurassic, assembled from large continents like Euramerica, Gondwana, and Siberia, as well as smaller landmasses like the Cathaysian and Cimmerian Terranes. The name Pangaea is Greek for “all lands”.
Pannotia
A supercontinent that existed in the Late Precambrian and gave rise to the continents of Gondwana, Laurentia, Siberia, and Baltica in the Cambrian.
Panthalassic Ocean

A vast ocean that existed from the Late Precambrian to the Jurassic, circling the globe and connecting to smaller oceans that developed throughout the Phanerozoic.
past
The entire set or any subset of events which happened previously in time.
people's history

1. A type of historical narrative which attempts to account for historical events from the perspective of ordinary people rather than leaders or authority figures, using a bottom-up approach that rejects elite perspectives, instead emphasizing those of the poor, the disenfranchised, the oppressed, nonconformists, social or cultural minorities, and any group that otherwise exists on the margins of society.
2. History for and about the majority of the population, especially that which is highly accessible and relevant to the people as a whole, as opposed to history that is intended for or only accessible to well-educated audiences or serious scholars.
periodization
The process or study of categorizing the past into discrete, quantified, and named periods or blocks of time, e.g. the Bronze Age, the Middle Ages, the Victorian Era, etc. This is often done to facilitate the analysis of history and the causality that might have linked specific events, resulting in descriptive abstractions that provide convenient labels for periods of time with relatively unique or stable characteristics, though the time periods represented by these labels often overlap because their beginnings and ends are imprecisely defined. In reality, history is continuous and not generalized, and therefore all systems of periodization are more or less arbitrary.
phaleristics
The study of military orders, decorations, and medals.
philately
The study of postage stamps.
philology
The study of language in oral and written historical sources, in particular literary texts, involving the establishment of their authenticity and original form and the determination of their meaning. The discipline lies at the intersection of textual criticism, literary criticism, history, and linguistics.
political history
The study of past events, ideas, movements, and leaders in politics.
popular history
post-classical history
precolonial history
prehistory

The period of human history between the use of the first stone tools by hominin apes (c. 3.3 million years ago) and the invention of the earliest forms of writing (c. 5,000 years ago), the latter of which marks the beginning of conventional history. The distinction between prehistory and history – i.e. between those events that occurred before the advent of writing and those that occurred after – is important because the scientific study of prehistoric events relies on very different methods from those used to study historic events. In the absence of written records, prehistory can only be understood through the interpretation of physical artefacts, fossils, and preserved archaeological contexts, combined with inferences based on research from other disciplines of the natural sciences, in particular anthropology, evolutionary biology, and geology. The prehistoric period also does not have a universally consistent end date, because human populations invented or adopted writing at different times in different places. See also protohistory.
presentism
The application of present-day ideas and perspectives to depictions or interpretations of the past.
primary source
Material from or directly related to the past. The term usually refers to written records and documents created during the period that is being studied, such as diaries, letters, legal documents, accounts, photographs, and news reports, but may also in the broadest sense include cultural artefacts. Contrast secondary source.
prosopography
The study of collective biography; the examination of a historical group of individuals, e.g. those in a common occupation, institution, or place, through a collective study of their lives.
protohistory
1. A period between prehistory and history during which a particular civilization or culture has not yet developed writing but during which other contemporary cultures have already noted in their own writings the existence of the pre-literate culture. For example, the cultures of ancient Celtic and Germanic tribes are considered protohistoric when they began appearing in contemporary Greek and Roman sources.
2. The transition period between the advent of literacy in a society and the earliest surviving writings of the first historians to emerge from that society.
provenance
The chronology of the ownership, custody, or location of a historical object, document, or group of records.
pseudohistory
A type of pseudoscholarship that attempts to distort or misrepresent the historical record, often using methods resembling those in legitimate historical research and frequently in service to a particular political, religious, or personal agenda. Works of pseudohistory share some features with other types of pseudoscience, such as treating myths, legends, and other unreliable sources as literal historical truth; emphasizing historical sources that appear to support the pseudohistorical thesis while ignoring or dismissing those that contradict it; and conflating possibility with actuality, assuming that if something could have happened, then it did.
psychohistory
public history
A range of activities undertaken by people with some training in the discipline of history, but who are generally working outside of specialized academic settings.

== Q ==
quantitative history
An approach to historical research that makes use of quantitative, statistical, and computer-based tools.

== R ==
radical history
History practiced as a form of social protest; i.e. history written in conscious opposition to perceived social injustice and dedicated to the furtherance of progressive political and social change. Practitioners of radical history believe that historians are morally obligated to relate their research to the struggle for positive change and to use the study of the past for the betterment of the present and the future. From their standpoint, knowledge of the past is not valuable for its own sake but only insofar as it may be used to serve some social purpose.
radiocarbon dating
recorded history
reenactment
See historical reenactment.
reference work
A text, usually in the form of a dictionary or encyclopedia, which contains facts and information but typically not discussions.
regnal year
A year of the reign of a particular sovereign or monarch, with the date considered as an ordinal rather than a cardinal number, e.g. "the third year in the reign of King Henry VIII". Regnal dating systems were widely used in historical times to date specific events and official records, including documents of parliamentary sessions in the United Kingdom until 1963, when the Gregorian calendar was instead adopted as the formal dating convention.
Renaissance
respect des fonds
An archival principle which proposes that collections of archival records should be ordered and preserved according to the administration, organization, individual, or entity by which they were created or from which they were received.
retronym
retrospective
revisionist history
Any approach to history in which a previously held interpretation of history or of an historical event is revised. In the most general usage, every original historian may be said to be a revisionist historian, because the simple act of generating a new understanding of the past necessarily challenges or re-interprets the body of historical knowledge about a subject, though the term may also refer more specifically to re-interpretations of the mainstream or "orthodox" views on a particular time period or event, a practice known as historical revisionism, or, with the much more negative connotation of distorting the historical record in service of a political agenda, to historical negationism.
revolution
Rodinia
A supercontinent that existed during the Late Precambrian before the supercontinent Pannotia, and the oldest supercontinent for which scientists have a good record. The name Rodinia is Russian for "homeland".
Romanticism
A cultural and intellectual movement of the late 18th to mid-19th centuries that emphasized emotion and sentiment rather than reason, predominantly among Western European cultures but also in other parts of the world.

== S ==
saeculum
A length of time approximately equal to the potential lifetime of a human being or, equivalently, to the time it takes to completely regenerate a human population with new individuals – that is, the duration between the moment at which an event occurs (such as the founding of a city) and the point in time at which every individual who was alive at the first moment has died.
Scientific Revolution
seal
A device for making an impression, usually in wax, clay, or lead, or the impression so formed, which historically was commonly used to authenticate documents on the rationale that a carefully crafted symbol or image would be difficult for counterfeiters to precisely replicate.
second modernity
secondary source
Material created by somebody removed from the event being studied; i.e. someone who was contemporaneous with the event but not physically present to witness it, or who was working from a period of time after the event occurred. All historical textbooks, for example, are secondary sources. Contrast primary source.
sensory history
Siberia

A separate continental plate that existed from the Latest Precambrian to the Carboniferous, composed of a large part of what is now central Russia, namely the modern region of Siberia.
sigillography
The study of the seals and symbols used to authenticate documents, variously made by impressing an image into wax, clay, lead, or another substance.
social history
A branch of history that studies human societies of the past, particularly social structures, hierarchies, and expectations and how they have changed over time, often by detailing the experiences of ordinary people in the past.
Space Age
statistics
The study of the collection, organization, and interpretation of (historical) data.
Stone Age
The first of the three periods into which prehistory is traditionally divided, during which stone was widely used by early hominins to make tools with an edge, a point, or a percussion surface. It preceded the Bronze Age and the Iron Age but spanned a period of time far longer than either of them, usually considered to have begun as early as 3.4 million years ago and to have ended with the advent of metalworking and particularly copper smelting, which were adopted at different times in different parts of the world but generally between 4000 BCE and 2000 BCE, after which bronze became widespread and supplanted stone in many uses.
stratigraphy
In archaeology, a key concept in interpreting a site through establishing the relative chronology of its separate physical contexts.
subaltern
In postcolonial studies and critical theory, the colonial populations that are socially, politically, and/or geographically excluded from the hierarchy of power of an imperial colony and from the metropolitan homeland of the colonial empire, often deliberately in order to deny their agency and voices in colonial politics.
subaltern studies

== T ==
teleology
A mode of historical interpretation that holds that events move towards a definite end state or goal.
terminus ante quem (TAQ)
The latest time at which a specific, punctual event could possibly have occurred, as indicated by placing the event relative to any other events whose dates are known with certainty. The concept establishes a limit after which an event could not have occurred based on logical expectations about the progression of a chronology, e.g. the decree of a law that is known to have been decreed by a specific monarch could not have occurred after the monarch's death.
terminus post quem (TPQ)
The earliest time at which a specific, punctual event could possibly have occurred, as indicated by placing the event relative to any other events whose dates are known with certainty. The concept establishes a limit before which an event could not have occurred based on logical expectations about the progression of a chronology, e.g. a battle in a which a specific person is known to have been killed could not have occurred before the person's date of birth (or any other securely dated event in the person's life).
Tethys Ocean
A small ocean that existed from the Triassic to the Jurassic. As Pangaea was split into Gondwana and Laurasia in the Jurassic, an arm developed westward called the Tethys Seaway or Tethys Sea.
three-age system
The periodization of human history into three time periods. The most common example is the division of prehistory into the Stone Age, Bronze Age, and Iron Age, though the concept may also refer to other tripartite divisions of historic time periods.
time
The indefinite continued progress of existence and events that occur in an apparently irreversible succession from the past, through the present, and into the future.
timeline
A list of historical events presented in chronological order, typically of a tabular or graphical design, especially in the form of a line labeled with specific dates or ranges of dates and the contemporaneous events that occurred on those dates; often the length of the line scales to the duration of time it represents, allowing viewers to quickly and easily comprehend the order of events and the relative amounts of time between them.
timeliness
The quality of punctuality and proximity to a historical event, as a means of assessing the reliability of a source. Timeliness is an important consideration in determining the reliability of historical records because records produced contemporaneously with an event are generally considered more accurate than records produced at a later time.
top-down approach
An approach to historical scholarship that emphasizes the experiences and perspectives of elites and leaders, as opposed to average people. Contrast bottom-up approach.
toponymy
The study of placenames.
transhistoricity
The quality of a concept or entity that persists throughout human history and is not governed or defined by the frame of reference of a particular time and place.
translatio imperii
translatio studii
An historiographical concept originating in the Middle Ages in which history is viewed as a linear succession of transfers of knowledge and learning from one place and time to another. For example, ancient Rome was commonly seen as having inherited the knowledge, ideas, and cultural values of the ancient Hellenistic civilizations which had preceded it.
transnational history
typescript
A document that is typewritten, i.e. produced using a typewriter or a digital computer, as opposed to a manuscript, which is handwritten.
typology
In archaeology, the classification of artifacts, buildings, and field monuments according to their physical characteristics; an important tool for managing large quantities of archaeological data.

== U ==
universal history
A work that aims to present a complete history of all mankind as a whole, coherent unit, including all times, nations, peoples, and events in recorded history, insofar as a scientific treatment of them is possible.
unwitting testimony
Unintentional evidence provided by historical sources, e.g. by authors whose writings reveal the implicit or subconscious attitudes, beliefs, or preconceptions of the author or of the society or culture to which the author belongs, even when the author did not intend to do so. The interpretation of unwitting testimony by historians acknowledges that primary sources may contain valuable information about the past which is not explicit or deliberate.
urban history

== V ==
Victorian

== W ==
warfare

Whig history
A mode of historical interpretation which presents the past as an inevitable progression towards ever greater liberty and enlightenment; or, more broadly, any teleological or goal-directed narrative that assumes the inevitability of progress in human civilization.
women's history
The study of the role that women have played in history, with particular emphasis on the growth of women's rights, individual women and groups of women of historical significance, and the effects that historical events have had on women. Inherent in the discipline is the belief that more traditional approaches to history have minimized or ignored the contributions of women and the impacts of political, social, and technological change on women's lives; in this respect, women's history is often practiced as a form of historical revisionism, seeking to challenge the orthodox historical consensus and make it more inclusive.
world history
written history

== Y ==
yuga

== See also ==
- Index of history articles
- Outline of history
