= Outline of history =

Overview of and topical guide to History

The following outline is provided as an overview of and topical guide to history:

History – discovery, collection, organization, and presentation of information about past events. History can also mean the period of time after writing was invented (the beginning of recorded history).

== Nature of history ==
History can be described as all of the following:

- Academic discipline – body of knowledge given to – or received by – a disciple (student); a branch or sphere of knowledge, or field of study, that an individual has chosen to specialise in.
  - one of the humanities – academic discipline that study the human condition, using methods that are primarily analytical, critical, or speculative, as distinguished from the mainly empirical approaches of the natural sciences.
- Field of science – widely recognized category of specialized expertise within science, and typically embodies its own terminology and nomenclature. Such a field will usually be represented by one or more scientific journals, where peer-reviewed research is published. There are many sociology-related scientific journals.
  - Social science – field of academic scholarship that explores aspects of human society.

=== Essence of history ===
- Chronology – science of arranging events in their order of occurrence in time, such as in historical timelines.
- Past – totality of events which occurred before a given point in time. The past is contrasted with and defined by the present and the future. The concept of the past is derived from the linear fashion in which human observers experience time, and is accessed through memory and recollection. The past is the domain of history.
- Time – measure in which events can be ordered from the past through the present into the future, and also the measure of durations of events and the intervals between them. Time is often referred to as the fourth dimension, along with the three spatial dimensions. History describes what happened where, but also when (in time) those events took place.

== Historical disciplines ==
- Archaeology – study of past human cultures through the recovery, documentation and analysis of material remains and environmental data
- Archontology – study of historical offices and important positions in state, international, political, religious and other organizations and societies
- Art history – study of changes in and social context of art
- Chronology – locating events in time
- Cultural history – study of culture in the past
- Diplomatic history – study of the historical foreign policy and diplomacy of states
- History of science – study of the emergence and development of scientific inquiry
- Economic history – the study of economics in the past
- Environmental history – study of natural history and the human relationship with the natural world
- Futurology – study of the future: researches the medium to long-term future of societies and of the physical world
- Historiography – both the study of the methodology of historians and development of history as a discipline, and also to a body of historical work on a particular subject. The historiography of a specific topic covers how historians have studied that topic using particular sources, techniques, and theoretical approaches.
- History painting – painting of works of art having historical motifs or depicting great events
- Intellectual history
- LGBTQ history – study of LGBTQ people and their culture around the world
- Local history – study of history in a geographically local context
- Military history – study of warfare and wars in history
- Naval history – branch of military history devoted to warfare at sea or in bodies of water
- Paleography – study of ancient texts
- Philosophy of history – philosophical study of history and its discipline.
- Political history – study of past political events, ideas, movements, and leaders
- Public history – presentation of history to public audiences and other areas typically outside academia
- Psychohistory – study of the psychological motivations of historical events
- Social history – study of societies and social trends in the past
- Universal history – study of trends and dynamics in world history
- Urban history – historical nature of cities and towns, and the process of urbanization
- Women's history – study of the roles of women throughout history
- World history – study of global or transnational historical patterns

=== Auxiliary sciences of history ===
Auxiliary sciences of history – scholarly disciplines which help evaluate and use historical sources and are seen as auxiliary for historical research. Auxiliary sciences of history include, but are not limited to:

- Archaeology – study of ancient and historic sites and artifacts
- Chronology – study of the sequence of past events
- Cliometrics – systematic application of economic theory, econometric techniques, and other formal or mathematical methods to the study of history
- Codicology – study of books as physical objects
- Diplomatics – study and textual analysis of historical documents
- Epigraphy – study of ancient inscriptions
- Faleristics – study of military orders, decorations and medals
- Genealogy – study of family relationships
- Heraldry – study of armorial devices
- Numismatics – study of coins
- Onomastics – study of proper names
- Paleography – study of old handwriting
- Philately – study of postage stamps
- Philology – study of the language of historical sources
- Prosopography – investigation of a historical group of individuals through a collective study of their lives
- Radiocarbon dating – assignation of dates to artefacts from the distant past
- Sigillography – study of seals
- Statistics – study of the collection, organization, and interpretation of (historical) data
- Toponymy – study of place-names

== History by period ==
- History of Earth
- Human history
- List of decades, centuries, and millennia
- News

=== History by chronology ===
- Chronology of the Universe
- Formation and evolution of the Solar System
- Geological history of Earth
- Evolutionary history of life
- Human history
- Universal history
  - Ancient history
    - Prehistory
    - Classical antiquity
  - Post-classical history
    - Early Middle Ages
    - High Middle Ages
    - Late Middle Ages
  - Modern history
    - Early modern period
    - Late modern period
    - Contemporary history
- Pre-Columbian
  - Mesoamerican chronology
- Renaissance
- Future history

=== Ages of history ===
==== Prehistoric Ages ====
- Stone Age
  - Paleolithic
    - Lower Paleolithic – (Homo, Stone tools, spread of Homo Erectus to Eurasia, control of fire, and later spears, pigments, constructed shelter)
    - Middle Paleolithic – (Recent African origin of modern humans, Homo sapiens, Homo neanderthalensis; clothing, beads, burial, bedding, bone tools)
    - Upper Paleolithic – (behavioral modernity, atlatl, domestication of dogs)
  - Mesolithic – (microliths, bow, canoes)
  - Neolithic – (domestication, nomadic pastoralism, agriculture, proto-cities)
    - Stone Age Levant
      - Tell Halaf
      - Ubaid period
    - Neolithic Europe – (Linear Pottery, Vinča culture)
    - Neolithic China
    - Neolithic South Asia
      - Mehrgarh
    - Paleo-Indians (Americas)
  - Chalcolithic (Copper Age) – (Yamna culture, Corded Ware)
    - Uruk period
    - Europe – (Metallurgy in pre-Columbian Mesoamerica)

==== Historic Ages ====
- Ancient Age
  - Bronze Age
  - Iron Age
- Postclassical Age (Middle Ages)
  - Early Middle Ages
  - High Middle Ages
  - Late Middle Ages
- Modern Age
  - Early modern Age
  - Late Modern Age
  - Contemporary Age

==== Other Ages ====
- Axial Age
- Dark Age
- Viking Age
- Age of Discovery
- Age of Reason
- Age of Enlightenment
- Industrial Age
- Atomic Age
- Information Age
- Space Age

== Regional histories ==
Regional history

- Ancient Egypt
- Babylonia
- India
- Classics
  - Ancient Greece
  - Ancient Rome
- Ancient China
- Mesoamerica

=== History by continent and country ===
- List of histories by country
- List of former sovereign states
- Timeline of country and capital changes since 1001 CE
- Timeline of ancient country changes before 1001 CE

=== Eras by region ===
Era

- Chinese Eras
- Japanese Eras
- Korean Eras
- Vietnamese Eras

== History by field ==
=== History of art ===
- History of art
  - History of the performing arts
    - History of dance
    - History of film
    - History of music
    - History of opera
    - History of theatre
  - History of visual arts
    - History of architecture (timeline)
    - History of design
    - History of drawing
    - History of film
    - History of painting
    - History of photography
    - History of sculpture

=== History of culture ===
- Cultural history
  - History of archaeology (timeline)
  - History of banking
  - History of cooking
  - History of games
    - History of chess
  - History of journalism
  - History of literature
  - History of money
  - History of poetry
  - History of rape
  - History of sport

=== History of mathematics ===
- History of mathematics (timeline)
  - History of algebra
  - History of arithmetic
  - History of calculus
  - History of geometry
  - History of trigonometry
  - History of logic
  - History of statistics

=== History of philosophy ===
- History of philosophy (timeline)
  - History of ethics
    - History of normative ethics
    - History of meta-ethics
  - History of humanism
  - History of logic
  - History of metaphysics
  - History of transhumanism
  - History of Western philosophy

=== History of religions ===
- History of religions (timeline)
  - Axial Age
  - Evolutionary origin of religions
  - The Bible and history
  - History of Buddhism (timeline)
  - History of Christianity (timeline)
    - Historical Jesus
    - History of the Catholic Church
    - History of Protestantism
      - History of the Puritans
  - History of creationism
  - History of Hinduism
  - History of Islam (timeline)
  - History of Judaism
  - History of Taoism
  - History of Wicca

=== History of science ===
- History of science
  - History of science in general
    - History of scientific method
    - Theories/sociology of science
    - Historiography
    - History of pseudoscience
  - By era
    - History of science in early cultures
    - History of science in Classical Antiquity
    - History of science in the Middle Ages
    - History of science in the Renaissance
    - Scientific Revolution
  - History of natural science
    - History of biology
      - History of biochemistry
    - History of physical science
      - History of nature
      - History of astronomy (timeline)
      - History of chemistry
      - History of ecology
      - History of geography
      - History of geology (timeline)
      - History of meteorology (timeline)
        - History of tornado research
      - History of oceanography
      - History of physics

=== History of social sciences ===
- History of the social sciences
  - Business history
  - Historiography
  - History of anthropology
  - History of archaeology (timeline)
  - History of criminal justice
  - History of economic thought
  - History of education
  - History of geography
  - History of linguistics
  - History of management
  - History of marketing
  - History of political science
  - History of psychology (timeline)
  - History of science and technology
  - History of scientific method
  - History of sociology (timeline)
  - Legal history (history of law)

=== History of technology ===
- History of technology
  - Aviation history
  - History of agricultural science
  - History of agriculture
  - History of architecture (timeline)
  - History of artificial intelligence
  - History of biotechnology
  - History of cartography
  - History of communication
  - History of computer science
    - History of programming languages (timeline)
    - History of software engineering
  - History of electromagnetism
  - History of engineering
    - History of chemical engineering
    - History of electrical engineering
  - History of materials science
  - History of measurement
  - History of medicine
  - History of transport
  - Industrial history
  - Military history
    - List of battles
    - List of wars
  - Timeline of historic inventions

=== History of interdisciplinary fields ===
- Classics
- History of ideas

== Methods and tools ==
- Prosopography – a methodological tool for the collection of all known information about individuals within a given period
- Historical revisionism – traditionally used in a completely neutral sense to describe the work or ideas of a historian who has revised a previously accepted view of a particular topic
- Historiography – study of historical methodology

== General concepts ==
- Annals
- Big History
- Centuries
- Chronicle
- Chronology
- Decades
- Era
- Human evolution
- Family history
- Future
- Future history
- Genealogy
- Historian
- Historical classification
- Historical thinking – scholastic reasoning skills applied to historical content, including chronological thinking, historical comprehension, historical analysis and interpretation, historical research capabilities, and historical issues analysis and decision making.
- History is written by the victors
- History of science and technology
  - Timeline of historic inventions
  - Timeline of electromagnetism and classical optics
  - Timeline of mathematics
  - Timeline of atomic and subatomic physics
- Identity
- Landscape history
- List of time periods
- Marxist historiography
- Millennium
- Mythology
- Narrative
- Oral tradition
- Oral history
- Palaeography
- Past
- Periodization
- Political history
- Prehistory
- Present
- Pseudohistory
- Social history
- Social change
- Virtual history

== Historians ==
- Antiquity
  - Greco-Roman world
  - China
- Middle Ages
  - Byzantine sphere
  - Latin sphere
  - Islamic world
  - East Asia
  - India
- Renaissance to early modern
  - Renaissance Europe
  - Early modern period
  - Middle East and Islamic Empires
  - East Asia
- Modern historians
  - Historians flourishing post-1815, born post-1770
  - Historians born in the 19th century
  - Historians born in the 20th century

== Lists ==
- Index of history articles
- Outline of archaeology
- Outline of classical studies
- Outline of medieval history
- Outline of the Renaissance
- List of historians
- List of timelines
