= List of historical classifications =

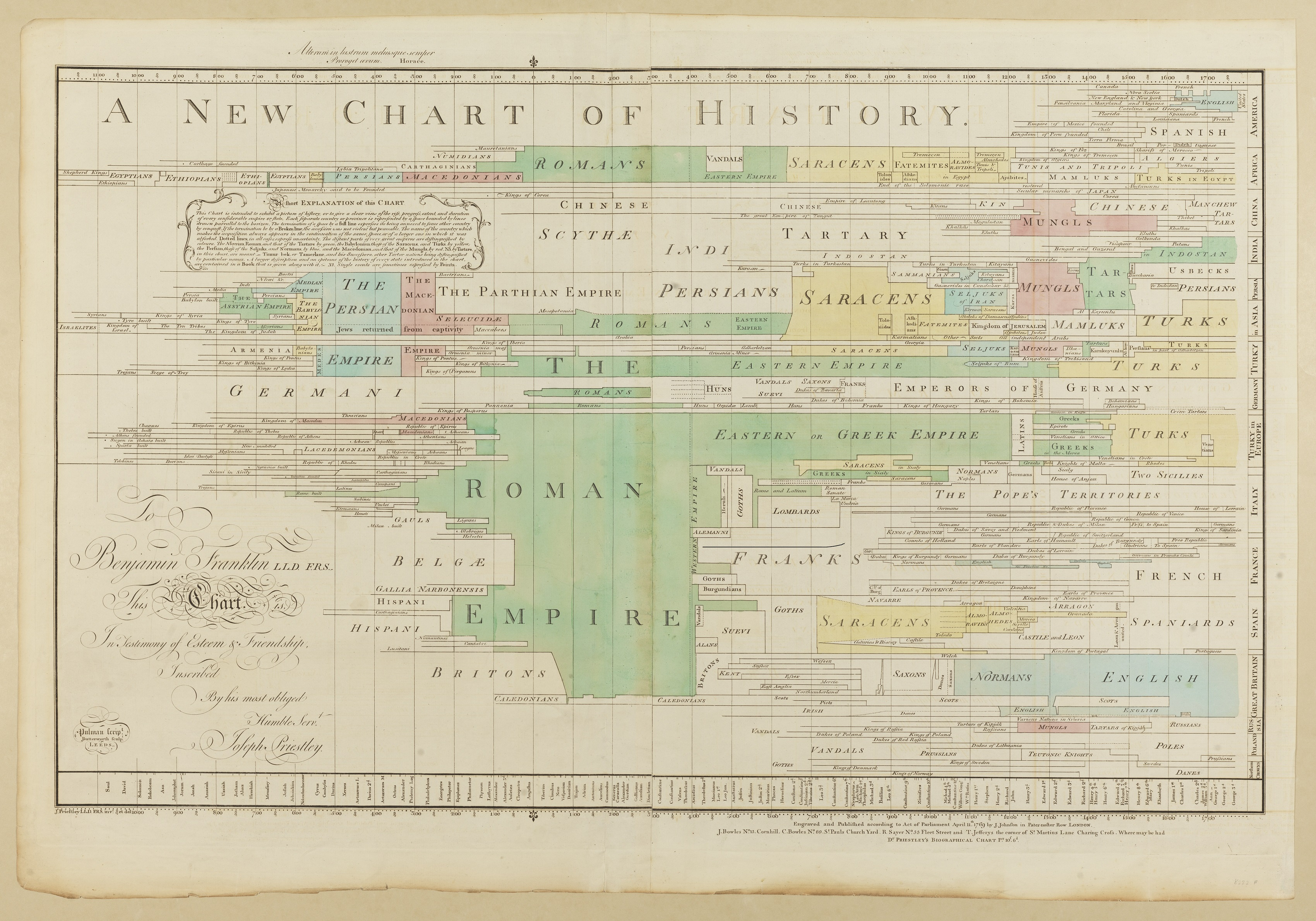
A chart of the relationship of historic cultures to time and territory (1769).

Historical classification groups the various history topics into different categories according to subject matter as shown below.

== Meta-history ==
- Philosophy of history

== By geographic region ==
- World
- Africa
- Americas
- Asia
- Europe
- Oceania
- Antarctica

== By geographic subregion ==
- North America
- South America
- Latin America
- Central America
  - Pre-Columbian
  - Mesoamerica
- Caribbean
- Eurasia
- History of Europe
  - Prehistoric Europe
  - Classical antiquity
  - Late Antiquity
  - Middle Ages
  - Early modern period
  - Modern Europe
- Central Asia
- South Asia
- East Asia
- Southeast Asia
- Middle East
  - Ancient Near East
- Australasia (Australia, New Guinea, Micronesia, Melanesia, Polynesia)
- Pacific Islands

== By times ==
- Centuries
- Decades
- Periodization
- List of named time periods
- List of timelines

== By general time period ==
- Prehistory
- Ancient history
- Modern world

See also Periodization.

== By religion ==
- History of Hinduism
- History of religion
- History of Christianity
- History of Islam
- Jewish history
- History of Buddhism

== By nation ==
- History of extinct nations and states

== By topic, miscellaneous ==
- Cultural movements
- Diaspora studies
- Family history
- Environmental history
- Local history
- Maritime history
- Microhistory
- Confederation
- Social History
- Urban History

=== Mathematics and the natural sciences ===
- History of mathematics
- History of science and technology
- History of astronomy
- History of physics
- History of chemistry
- History of geology
- History of biology
- History of medicine
- History of mental illness

=== Social sciences ===
- History of art
- History of astrology
- History of cinema
- History of economic thought/Economic history
- History of ideas
- History of literature
- History of music
- History of philosophy
- History of sexuality
- History of theatre
- Intellectual history
- Legal history
- Microhistory
- Military history

== By ideological classification (historiography) ==
Although there is arguably some intrinsic bias in history studies (with national bias perhaps being the most significant), history can also be studied from ideological perspectives, such as:

- Marxist historiography
- Feminist history

A type of historical speculation known commonly as counterfactual history has also been adopted by some historians as a means of assessing and exploring the possible outcomes if certain events had not occurred or had occurred in a different manner. This is somewhat similar to the alternate history genre of fiction.

Lists of false or dubious historical resources and historical myths that were once popular and widespread, or have become so, have also been prepared.
