= History =

Study of the past

History is the systematic study of the past, focusing primarily on the human past. As an academic discipline, it analyses and interprets evidence to construct narratives about what happened and explain why it happened. Some theorists categorize history as a social science, while others see it as part of the humanities or consider it a hybrid discipline. Similar debates surround the purpose of history—for example, whether its main aim is theoretical, to uncover the truth, or practical, to learn lessons from the past. In a more general sense, the term history refers not to an academic field but to the past itself, times in the past, or to individual texts about the past.

Historical research relies on primary and secondary sources to reconstruct past events and validate interpretations. Source criticism is used to evaluate these sources, assessing their authenticity, content, and reliability. Historians strive to integrate the perspectives of several sources to develop a coherent narrative. Different schools of thought, such as positivism, the Annales school, Marxism, and postmodernism, have distinct methodological approaches.

History is a broad discipline encompassing many branches. Some focus on specific time periods, such as ancient history, while others concentrate on particular geographic regions, such as the history of Africa. Thematic categorizations include political history, military history, social history, and economic history. Branches associated with specific research methods and sources include quantitative history, comparative history, and oral history.

History emerged as a field of inquiry in antiquity to replace myth-infused narratives, with influential early traditions originating in Greece, China, and later in the Islamic world. Historical writing evolved throughout the ages and became increasingly professional, particularly during the 19th century, when a rigorous methodology and various academic institutions were established. History is related to many fields, including historiography, philosophy, education, politics, and archaeology.

== Definition ==
As an academic discipline, history is the study of the past with the main focus on the human past. It conceptualizes and describes what happened by collecting and analysing evidence to construct narratives. These narratives cover not only how events developed over time but also why they happened and in which contexts, providing an explanation of relevant background conditions and causal mechanisms. History further examines the meaning of historical events and the underlying human motives driving them.

In a slightly different sense, history refers to the past events themselves. Under this interpretation, history is what happened rather than the academic field studying what happened. When used as a countable noun, a history is a representation of the past in the form of a history text. History texts are cultural products involving active interpretation and reconstruction. The narratives presented in them can change as historians discover new evidence or reinterpret already-known sources. The past itself, by contrast, is static and unchangeable. Some historians focus on the interpretative and explanatory aspects to distinguish histories from chronicles, arguing that chronicles only catalogue events in chronological order, whereas histories aim at a comprehensive understanding of their causes, contexts, and consequences. (Note: Some authors restrict the term history to the factual series of past events and use the term historiography for the study of those events. Others use the term history for the study and representation of the past. They characterize historiography as a metatheory studying the methods and historical development of this academic discipline.)

History has been primarily concerned with written documents. It focused on recorded history since the invention of writing, leaving prehistory (Note: Some theorists identify protohistory as a distinct period after prehistory that spans from the invention of writing to the first attempts to record history.) to other fields, such as archaeology. Its scope broadened in the 20th century as historians became interested in the human past before the invention of writing. (Note: Big History, formulated by the historian David Christian in the late 1980s, reaches back even further to the Big Bang, covering the cosmological development of the universe and the biological evolution of life in addition to human history.)

Historians debate whether history is a social science or forms part of the humanities. Like social scientists, historians formulate hypotheses, gather objective evidence, and present arguments based on this evidence. At the same time, history aligns closely with the humanities because of its reliance on subjective aspects associated with interpretation, storytelling, human experience, and cultural heritage. Some historians strongly support one or the other classification while others characterize history as a hybrid discipline that does not belong to one category at the exclusion of the other. History contrasts with pseudohistory, a label used to describe practices that deviate from historiographical standards by relying on disputed historical evidence, selectively ignoring genuine evidence, or using other means to distort the historical record. Often motivated by specific ideological agendas, pseudohistorical practices mimic historical methodology to promote biased, misleading narratives that lack rigorous analysis and scholarly consensus.

=== Purpose ===
Various suggestions about the purpose or value of history have been made. Some historians propose that its primary function is the pure discovery of truth about the past. This view emphasizes the disinterested pursuit of truth as an end in itself, whereas external purposes, associated with ideology or politics, threaten to undermine the accuracy of historical research by distorting the past. In this role, history also challenges traditional myths lacking factual support. (Note: Early historians, such as Herodotus and Thucydides, already criticized the accounts of Homer and other poets as fantastic and inaccurate.)

A different perspective suggests that the main value of history lies in the lessons it teaches for the present. This view stems from the idea that an understanding of the past can guide decision-making, for example, to avoid repeating previous mistakes. A related perspective focuses on a general understanding of the human condition, making people aware of the diversity of human behaviour across different contexts—similar to what one can learn by visiting foreign countries. History can also foster social cohesion by providing people with a collective identity through a shared past, helping to preserve and cultivate cultural heritage and values across generations. For some scholars, including Whig historians and the Marxist scholar E. H. Carr, history is a key to understanding the present and, in Carr's case, shaping the future. (Note: Similarly, Neil MacGregor suggests: "What is very remarkable about German history as a whole is that the Germans use their history to think about the future, where the British tend to use their history to comfort themselves.")

Politicians and ideologues have sometimes used history for political or ideological purposes, for instance, to justify the status quo by emphasizing the respectability of certain traditions or to promote change by highlighting past injustices. In extreme forms, evidence is intentionally ignored or misinterpreted to construct misleading narratives, which can result in pseudohistory or historical denialism. (Note: Historical revisionism, a related outlook, seeks to overturn established perspectives on history. This can take a variety of forms, from the introduction of new evidence and methods which counter current thinking, to criticizing the value or significance of historical events or actors. Some theorists use the term revisionism in a neutral sense for any rejection or reinterpretation of mainstream views. Others associate revisionism with practices that disregard genuine evidence and incorporate intensely sceptical and relativist views to justify pseudohistorical perspectives, attempting to discredit established knowledge of historical events through epistemic criticism.) Influential examples of denialism of historical events include Holocaust denial, Armenian genocide denial, Nanjing Massacre denial, and Holodomor denial.

=== Etymology ===
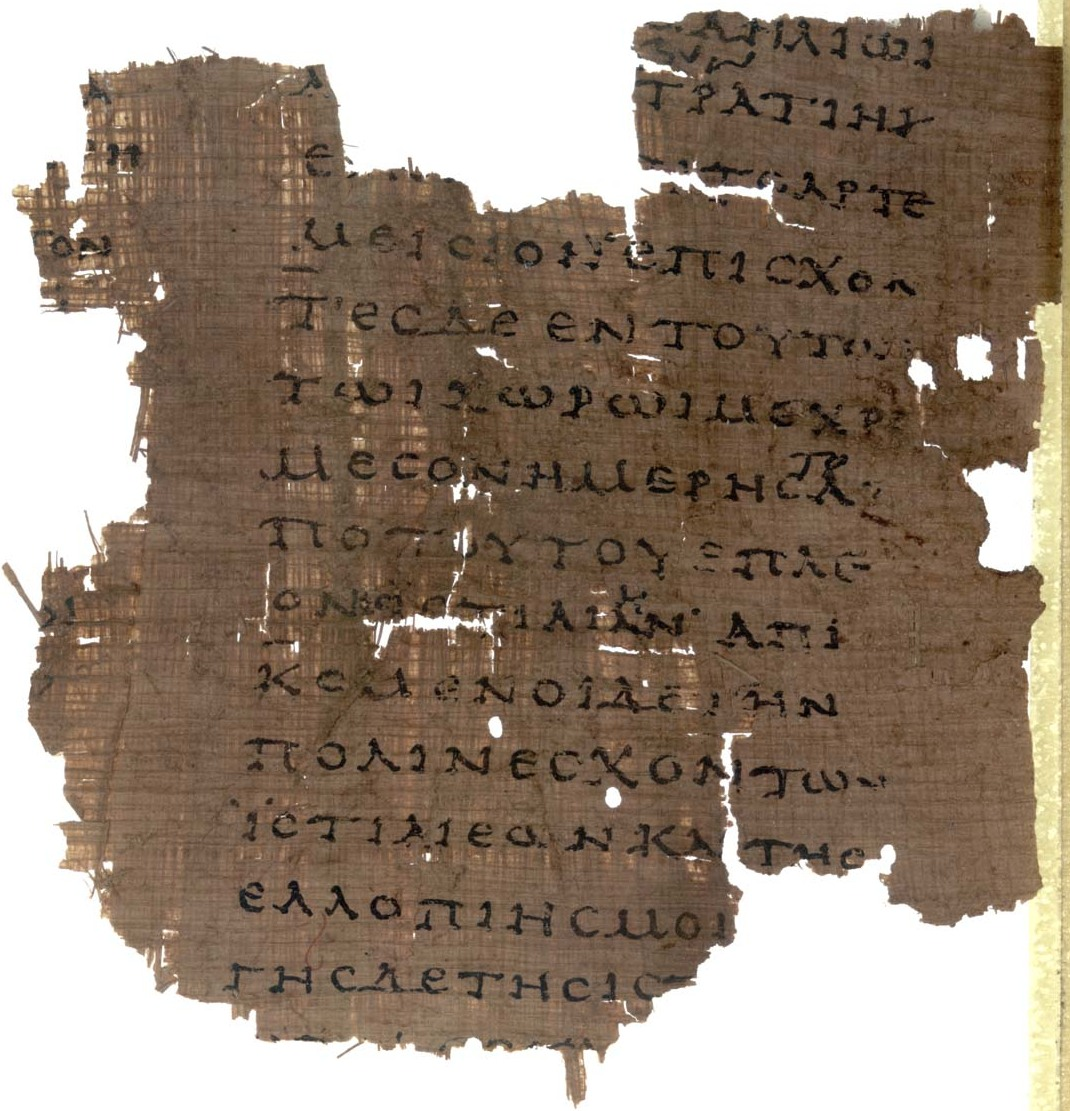
Fragment of the Histories by Herodotus, an Ancient Greek historical text

The English-language word history comes from the Ancient Greek term ἵστωρ (histōr), meaning 'learned, wise man'. This gave rise to the Ancient Greek word ἱστορία (historiā), which had a wide meaning associated with inquiry in general and giving testimony. Classical Latin later adopted ἱστορία into Classical Latin as historia. In Hellenistic and Roman times, the meaning of the term shifted, placing more emphasis on narrative aspects and on the art of presentation rather than focusing on investigation and testimony.

The word entered Middle English in the 14th century via the Old French term histoire. At this time, it meant 'story, tale', encompassing both factual and fictional narratives. In the 15th century, its meaning shifted to cover the branch of knowledge studying the past in addition to narratives about the past. In the 18th and 19th centuries, the word history became more closely associated with factual accounts and with evidence-based inquiry, coinciding with the professionalization of historical inquiry; this meaning still dominates in contemporary usage. The dual meaning, referring to both mere stories and factual accounts of the past, is present in the terms for "history" in many other European languages. They include the French histoire, the Italian storia, and the German Geschichte.

== Methods ==
The historical method is a set of techniques historians use to research and interpret the past, covering the processes of collecting, evaluating, and synthesizing evidence. (Note: Understood in a narrow sense, the historical method is sometimes limited to the evaluation or criticism of sources.) It seeks to ensure scholarly rigour, accuracy, and reliability in how historical evidence is chosen, analysed, and interpreted. Historical research often starts with a research question to define the scope of the inquiry. Some research questions focus on a simple description of what happened. Others aim to explain why a particular event occurred, refute an existing theory, or confirm a new hypothesis.

=== Sources and source criticism ===
To answer research questions, historians rely on various types of evidence to reconstruct the past and support their conclusions. Historical evidence is usually divided into primary and secondary sources. A primary source is a source that originated during the period that is studied. Primary sources can take various forms, such as official documents, letters, diaries, eyewitness accounts, photographs, and audio or video recordings. They also include historical remains examined in archaeology, geology, and the medical sciences, such as artefacts and fossils unearthed from excavations. Primary sources offer the most direct evidence of historical events.

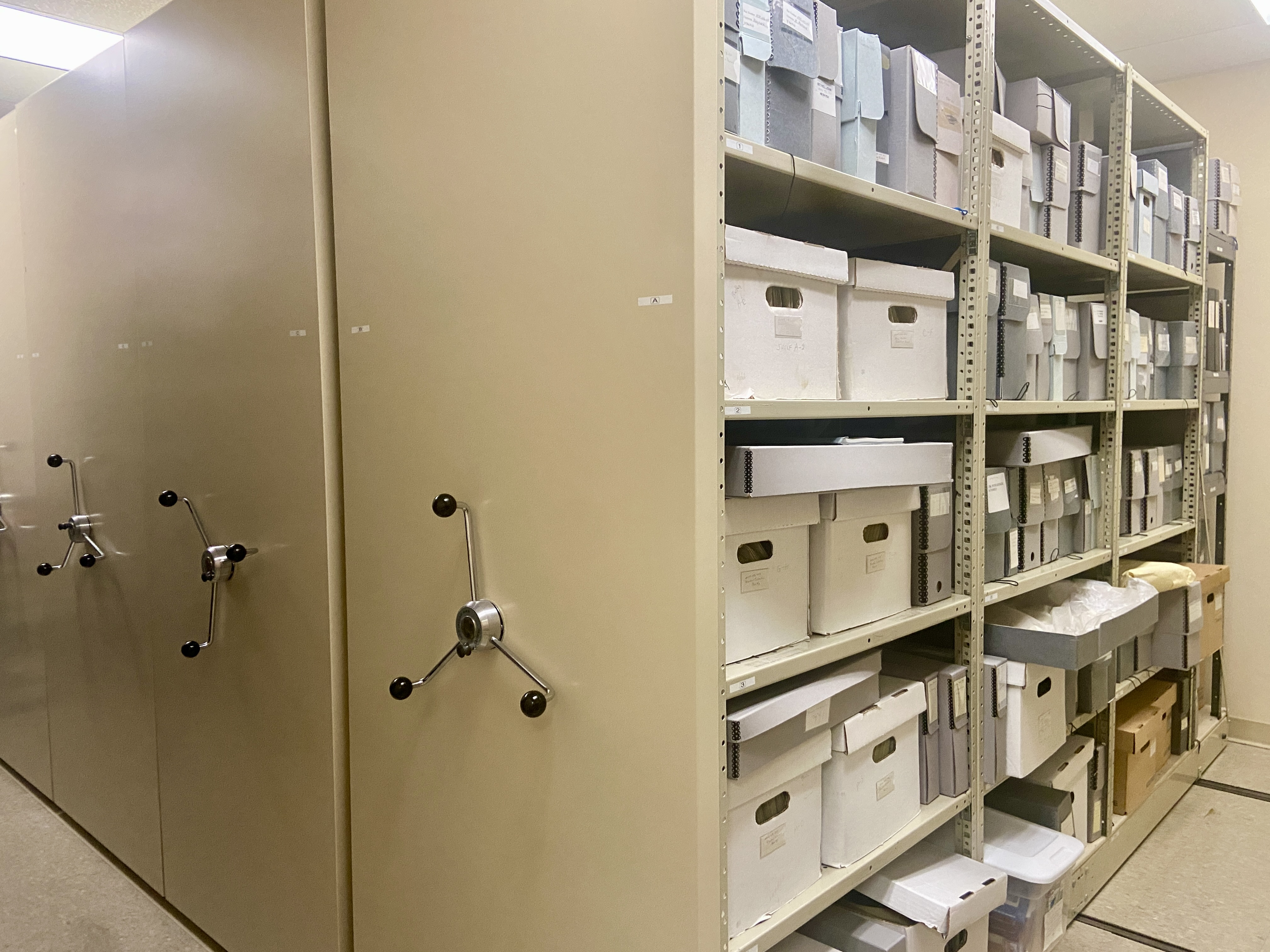
Archives preserve large quantities of original sources for researchers to access.

A secondary source is a source that analyses or interprets information found in other sources. Whether a document is a primary or a secondary source depends not only on the document itself but also on the purpose for which it is used. For example, if a historian writes a text about slavery based on an analysis of historical documents, then the text is a secondary source on slavery and a primary source on the historian's opinion. (Note: The exact definitions of primary source and secondary source are disputed, and there is not always consensus on how a particular source should be categorized. For example, if a person was not present at a riot but reports on it shortly after it happened, some historians consider this report a primary source while others see it as a secondary source.) Consistency with available sources is one of the main standards of historical works. For instance, the discovery of new sources may lead historians to revise or dismiss previously accepted narratives. To find and access primary and secondary sources, historians consult archives, libraries, and museums. Archives play a central role by preserving countless original sources and making them available to researchers in a systematic and accessible manner. Thanks to technological advances, historians increasingly rely on online resources, which offer vast digital databases with methods to search and access specific documents.

Source criticism is the process of analysing and evaluating the information a source provides. (Note: Leopold von Ranke's emphasis on source evaluation significantly influenced the practice of historical research.) Typically, this process begins with external criticism, which evaluates the authenticity of a source. It addresses the questions of when and where the source was created and seeks to identify the author, understand their reasons for producing the source, and determine if it has undergone some type of modification since its creation. Additionally, the process involves distinguishing between original works, copies, and deceptive forgeries.

Internal criticism evaluates the content of a source, typically beginning with the clarification of the meaning within the source. This involves disambiguating individual terms that could be misunderstood but may also require a general translation if the source is written in an unfamiliar language. (Note: Historians consider the context and time of the document to understand the meanings of the terms it uses. For example, if a document uses the word awful, they have to decide whether it expresses the modern meaning 'terrible' or the historical meaning 'worthy of awe'.) Once the information content of a source is understood, internal criticism is specifically interested in determining accuracy. Critics ask whether the information is reliable or misrepresents the topic and further question whether the source is comprehensive or omits important details. One way to make these assessments is to evaluate whether the author was able, in principle, to provide a faithful presentation of the studied event. Other approaches include the assessment of the influences of the author's intentions and prejudices, and cross-referencing information with other credible sources. Being aware of the inadequacies of a source helps historians decide whether and which aspects of it to trust, and how to use it to construct a narrative.

=== Synthesis and schools of thought ===
The selection, analysis, and criticism of sources result in the validation of a large collection of mostly isolated statements about the past. As a next step, sometimes termed historical synthesis, historians examine how the individual pieces of evidence fit together to form part of a larger story. (Note: This becomes particularly challenging if different sources provide seemingly contradictory information.) Constructing this broader perspective is crucial for a comprehensive understanding of the topic as a whole. It is a creative aspect (Note: The creativity and imagination needed for this step is one of the reasons why some theorists understand history as an art rather than a science.) of historical writing that reconstructs, interprets, and explains what happened by showing how different events are connected. In this way, historians address not only which events occurred but also why they occurred and what consequences they had. While there are no universally accepted techniques for this synthesis, historians rely on various interpretative tools and approaches in this process.

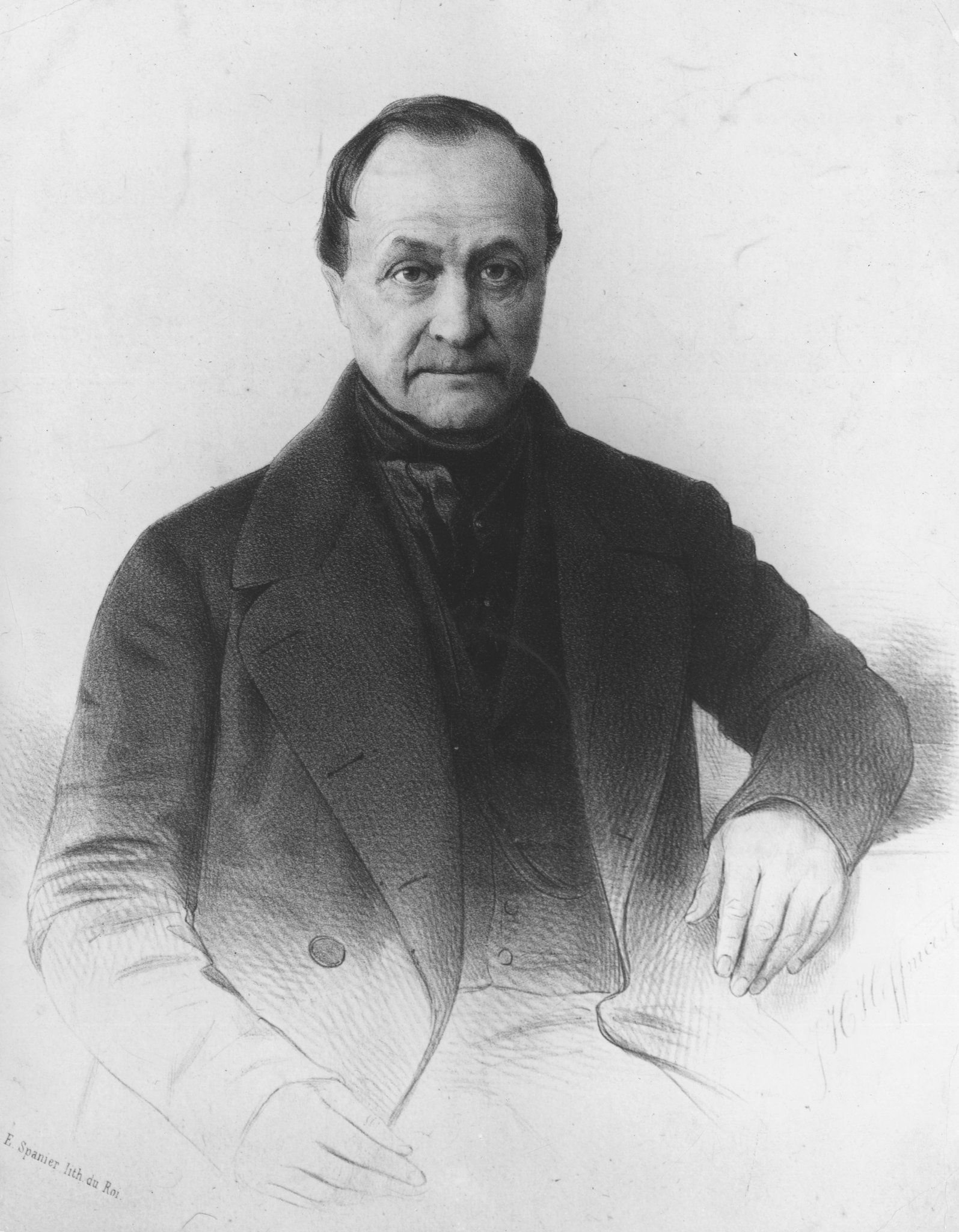
Auguste Comte articulated positivism, advocating a science-based approach to history.

One tool to provide an accessible overview of complex developments is the use of periodization, which divides a timeframe into different periods, each organized around central themes or developments that shaped the period. For example, the three-age system is traditionally used to divide early human history into Stone Age, Bronze Age, and Iron Age based on the predominant materials and technologies during these periods. Another methodological tool is the examination of silences, gaps or omissions in the historical record of events that occurred but did not leave significant evidential traces. Silences can happen when contemporaries find information too obvious to document but may also occur if there are specific reasons to withhold or destroy information. (Note: For example, Martha Washington burned all private letters between her and her husband George Washington, leaving decades worth of silences on their relationship. Another cause of silences, the existence of a taboo, such as a taboo against homosexuality, can have the effect that little information on the topic is recorded. The practice of erasing names of deceased people considered enemies from public record is known as damnatio memoriae.) Conversely, when large datasets are available, quantitative approaches can be used. For instance, economic and social historians commonly employ statistical analysis to identify patterns and trends associated with large groups.

Different schools of thought often come with their own methodological implications for how to write history. Positivists emphasize the scientific nature of historical inquiry, focusing on empirical evidence to discover objective truths. In contrast, postmodernists reject grand narratives that claim to offer a single, objective truth. Instead, they highlight the subjective nature of historical interpretation, which leads to a multiplicity of divergent perspectives. Marxists interpret historical developments as expressions of economic forces and class struggles. The Annales school highlights long-term social and economic trends while relying on quantitative and interdisciplinary methods. Feminist historians study the role of gender in history, with a particular interest in analysing the experiences of women to challenge patriarchal perspectives.

== Areas of study ==
History is a wide field of inquiry encompassing many branches. Some branches focus on a specific time period, while others concentrate on a particular geographic region or a distinct theme. Specializations of different types can usually be combined; for example, a work on economic history in ancient Egypt merges temporal, regional, and thematic perspectives. For topics with a broad scope, the amount of primary sources is often too extensive for an individual historian to review, forcing them to either narrow the scope of their topic or also rely on secondary sources to arrive at a wide overview.

=== By period ===
Chronological division is a common approach to organizing the vast expanse of history into more manageable segments. Different periods are often defined based on dominant themes that characterize a specific time frame and significant events that initiated these developments or brought them to an end. Depending on the selected context and level of detail, a period may be as short as a decade or longer than several centuries. A traditionally influential approach divides human history into prehistory, ancient history, post-classical history, early modern history, and modern history. (Note: There are disagreements about when exactly each period starts and ends. Alternative subdivisions may use overlapping or radically different time frames.) Depending on the region and theme, the time frames covered by these periods can vary, and historians may use entirely different periodizations. For example, traditional periodizations of Chinese history follow the main dynasties, and the division into pre-Columbian, colonial, and post-colonial periods plays a central role in the history of the Americas.

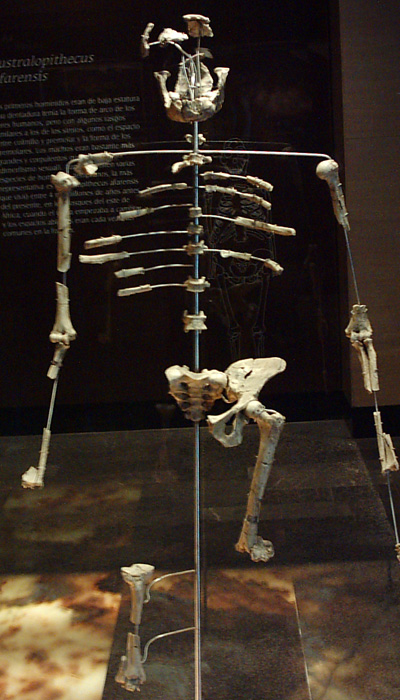
Historians draw on evidence from various fields to examine prehistory, including fossils like Lucy.

The study of prehistory includes the examination of the evolution of human-like species several million years ago, leading to the emergence of anatomically modern humans about 200,000 years ago. Subsequently, humans migrated out of Africa to populate most of the Earth. Towards the end of prehistory, technological advances in the form of new and improved tools led many groups to give up their established nomadic lifestyle, based on hunting and gathering, in favour of a sedentary lifestyle supported by early forms of agriculture. The absence of written documents from this period presents researchers with unique challenges. It results in an interdisciplinary approach relying on other forms of evidence from fields such as archaeology, anthropology, palaeontology, and geology.

Historians studying the ancient period examine the emergence of the first major civilizations in regions such as Mesopotamia, Egypt, the Indus Valley, China, and Peru, beginning approximately 3500 BCE in some regions. The new social, economic, and political complexities necessitated the development of writing systems. Thanks to advancements in agriculture, surplus food allowed these civilizations to support larger populations, leading to urbanization, the establishment of trade networks, and the emergence of regional empires. In the later part of the ancient period, sometimes termed the classical period, societies in China, India, Persia, and the Mediterranean expanded further, reaching new cultural, scientific, and political heights. Meanwhile, influential religious systems and philosophical ideas were first formulated, such as Hinduism, Buddhism, Confucianism, Judaism, and Greek philosophy.

In the study of post-classical or medieval history, which began around 500 CE, historians note the growing influence of major religions. Missionary religions, like Buddhism, Christianity, and Islam, spread rapidly and established themselves as world religions, marking a cultural shift as they gradually replaced other belief systems. Meanwhile, inter-regional trade networks flourished, leading to increased technological and cultural exchange. Conquering many territories in Asia and Europe, the Mongol Empire became a dominant force during the 13th and 14th centuries.

Historians focused on early modern history, which started roughly in 1500 CE, commonly highlight how European states rose to global power. As gunpowder empires, they explored and colonized large parts of the world. As a result, the Americas were integrated into the global network, triggering a vast biological exchange of plants, animals, people, and diseases. (Note: New diseases and European military aggression and exploitation had severe consequences in the form of a drastic loss of life and cultural disruption among Indigenous communities in the Americas.) The Scientific Revolution prompted major discoveries and accelerated technological progress. It was accompanied by other intellectual developments, such as humanism and the Enlightenment, which ushered in secularization.

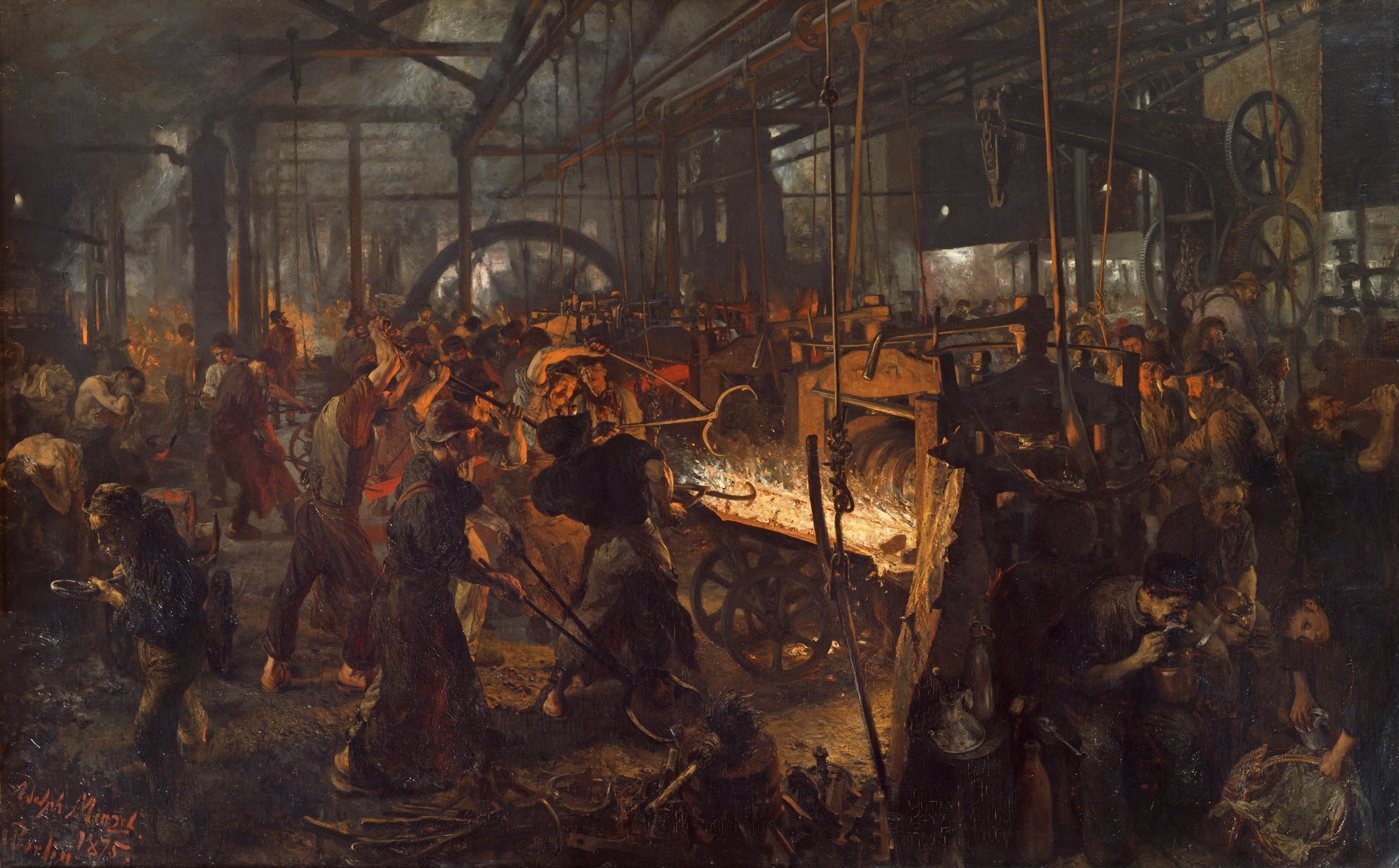
The Industrial Revolution had a profound impact on economic and social life, marking the transition from agrarian to industrial societies.

In the study of modern history, which began at the end of the 18th century, historians are interested in how the Industrial Revolution transformed economies by introducing more efficient modes of production. Western powers established vast colonial empires, gaining superiority through industrialized military technology. The increased international exchange of goods, ideas, and people marked the beginning of globalization. Various social revolutions challenged autocratic and colonial regimes, paving the way for democracies. Many developments in fields like science, technology, economy, living standards, and human population accelerated at unprecedented rates. This happened despite the widespread destruction caused by two world wars, which rebalanced international power relations by undermining European dominance.

=== By geographic location ===
Areas of historical study can also be categorized by the geographic locations they examine. Geography plays a central role in history through its influence on food production, natural resources, economic activities, political boundaries, and cultural interactions. (Note: Emphasizing the central relation between geography and history, Jules Michelet wrote in the 1869 preface of his Histoire de France: "without geographical basis, the people, the makers of history, seem to be walking on air".) Some historical works limit their scope to small regions, such as a village or a settlement. Others focus on broad territories that encompass entire continents, like the histories of Africa, Asia, Europe, the Americas, and Oceania.

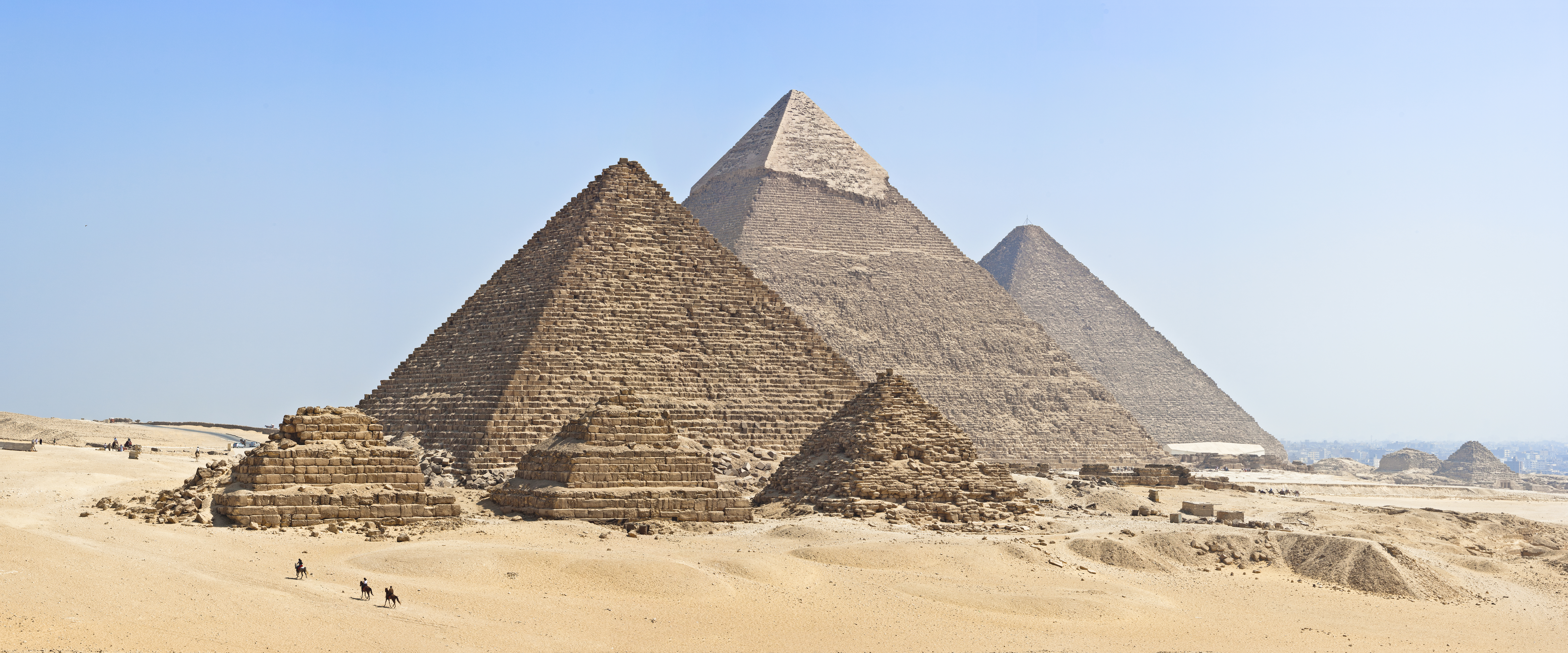
The Pyramids of Giza showcase the lasting heritage of the ancient Egyptian civilization.

The history of Africa begins with the examination of the evolution of anatomically modern humans. Ancient historians describe how the invention of writing and the establishment of civilization happened in ancient Egypt in the 4th millennium BCE. Over the next millennia, other notable civilizations and kingdoms formed in Nubia, Axum, Carthage, Ghana, Mali, and Songhay. Islam began spreading across North Africa in the 7th century CE and became the dominant faith in many empires. Meanwhile, trade along the trans-Saharan route intensified. Beginning in the 15th century, millions of Africans were enslaved and forcibly transported to the Americas as part of the Atlantic slave trade. Most of the continent was colonized by European powers in the late 19th and early 20th centuries. Amid rising nationalism, African states gradually gained independence in the aftermath of World War II, a period that saw economic progress, rapid population growth, and struggles for political stability.

Historians studying the history of Asia note the arrival of anatomically modern humans around 100,000 years ago. They explore Asia's role as one of the cradles of civilization, with the emergence of some of the first ancient civilizations in Mesopotamia, the Indus Valley, and China beginning in the 4th and 3rd millennia BCE. In the following millennia, civilizations on the Asian continent gave birth to all major world religions and several influential philosophical traditions, such as Hinduism, Buddhism, Confucianism, Taoism, Christianity, and Islam. Other developments were the establishment of the Silk Road, which facilitated trade and cultural exchange across Eurasia, and the formation of powerful empires, such as the Mongol Empire. European influence grew over the following centuries, ushering in the modern era. It culminated in the 19th and early 20th centuries when many parts of Asia came under direct colonial control until the end of World War II. The post-independence period was characterized by modernization, economic growth, and a steep increase in population.

Due to its influence on Western culture and philosophy, Ancient Greece is an important area of study for historians of Europe.

In the study of the history of Europe, historians describe the arrival of the first anatomically modern humans about 45,000 years ago. They explore how in the first millennium BCE the Ancient Greeks contributed key elements to the culture, philosophy, and politics associated with the Western world, and how their cultural heritage influenced the Roman and Byzantine Empires. The medieval period began with the fall of the Western Roman Empire in the 5th century CE and was marked by the spread of Christianity. Starting in the 15th century, European exploration and colonization interconnected the globe, while cultural, intellectual, and scientific developments transformed Western societies. From the late 18th to the early 20th centuries, European global dominance was further solidified by the Industrial Revolution and the establishment of large overseas colonies. It came to an end because of the devastating effects of two world wars. In the following Cold War era, the continent was divided into a Western and an Eastern bloc. They pursued political and economic integration in the aftermath of the Cold War.

Historians examining the history of the Americas document the arrival of the first humans around 20,000 to 15,000 years ago. The Americas were home to some of the earliest civilizations, like the Norte Chico civilization in South America and the Maya and Olmec civilizations in Central America. Over the next millennia, major empires arose beside them, such as the Teotihuacan, Aztec, and Inca empires. Following the arrival of the Europeans from the late 15th century onwards, the spread of newly introduced diseases drastically reduced the local population. Together with colonization, it led to the collapse of major empires as demographic and cultural landscapes were reshaped. Independence movements in the 18th and 19th centuries led to the formation of new nations across the Americas. In the 20th century, the United States emerged as a dominant global power and a key player in the Cold War.

In the study of the history of Oceania, historians note the arrival of humans about 60,000 to 50,000 years ago. They explore the establishment of diverse regional societies and cultures, first in Australia and Papua New Guinea and later also on other Pacific Islands. The arrival of the Europeans in the 16th century prompted significant transformations, and by the end of the 19th century, most of the region had come under Western control. Oceania became involved in various conflicts during the world wars and experienced decolonization in the post-war period.

=== By theme ===
Historians often limit their inquiry to a specific theme. Some propose a general subdivision into three major themes: political history, economic history, and social history. However, the boundaries between these branches are vague and their relation to other thematic branches, such as intellectual history, is not always clear.

Political history studies the organization of power in society, examining how power structures arise, develop, and interact. Throughout most of recorded history, states or state-like structures have been central to this field of study. It explores how a state was organized internally, like factions, parties, leaders, and other political institutions. It also examines which policies were implemented and how the state interacted with other states. Political history has been studied since antiquity by historians such as Herodotus and Thucydides, making it one of the oldest branches of history, while other major subfields have only become established branches in the past century.

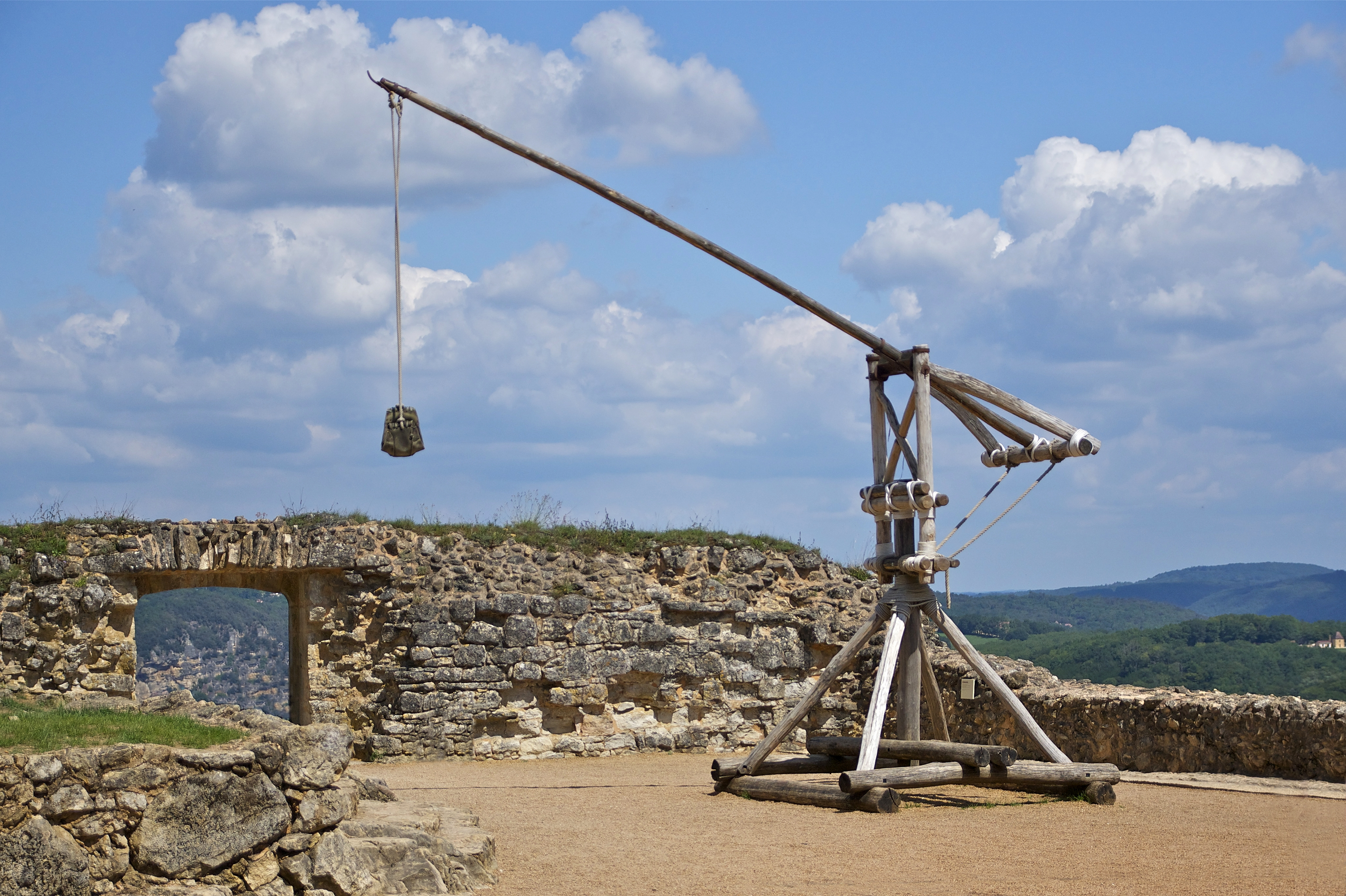
Military history studies armed conflicts, including advancements in military technology, like trebuchets.

Diplomatic and military history are associated with political history. Diplomatic history examines international relations between states. It covers foreign policy topics such as negotiations, strategic considerations, treaties, and conflicts between nations, as well as the role of international organizations in these processes. Military history studies the impact and development of armed conflicts in human history. This includes the examination of specific events, like the analysis of a particular battle and the discussion of the different causes of a war. It also involves more general considerations about the evolution of warfare, including advancements in military technology, strategies, tactics, logistics, and institutions.

Economic history examines how commodities are produced, exchanged, and consumed. It covers economic aspects such as the use of land, labour, and capital, the supply and demand of goods, the costs and means of production, and the distribution of income and wealth. Economic historians typically focus on general trends in the form of impersonal forces, such as inflation, rather than the actions and decisions of individuals. If enough data is available, they rely on quantitative methods, like statistical analysis. For periods before the modern era, available data is often limited, forcing economic historians to rely on scarce sources and extrapolate information from them.

Social history is a broad field investigating social phenomena, but its precise definition is disputed. Some theorists understand it as the study of everyday life outside the domains of politics and economics, including cultural practices, family structures, community interactions, and education. A closely related approach focuses on experience rather than activities, examining how members of particular social groups, like social classes, races, genders, or age groups, experienced their world. Other definitions see social history as the study of social problems, like poverty, disease, and crime, or take a broader perspective by examining how whole societies developed. Closely related fields include cultural history, gender history, and religious history.

Intellectual history is the history of ideas and studies how concepts, philosophies, and ideologies have evolved. It is particularly interested in academic fields but is not limited to them, including the study of the beliefs and prejudices of ordinary people. In addition to studying intellectual movements themselves, it also examines the cultural and social contexts that shaped them and their influence on other historical developments. As closely related fields, the history of philosophy investigates the development of philosophical thought while the history of science studies the evolution of scientific theories and practices, such as the scientific contributions of Charles Darwin and Albert Einstein. Art history, another connected discipline, examines historical works of art and the development of artistic activities, styles, and movements. It includes a discussion of the cultural, social, and political contexts of art production.

Environmental history studies the relation between humans and their environment. It seeks to understand how humans and the rest of nature have affected each other in the course of history. Other thematic branches include constitutional history, legal history, urban history, business history, history of technology, medical history, history of education, and people's history.

=== Others ===
Some branches of history are characterized by the methods they employ, such as quantitative history and digital history, which rely on quantitative methods and digital media. Comparative history compares historical phenomena from distinct times, regions, or cultures to examine their similarities and differences. Unlike most other branches, oral history relies on oral reports rather than written documents, encompassing eyewitness accounts, hearsay, and communal legends. It reflects the personal experiences, interpretations, and memories of common people, showcasing how people subjectively remember the past. Counterfactual history uses counterfactual thinking to examine alternative courses of history, exploring what could have happened under different circumstances. Certain branches of history are distinguished by their theoretical outlook, such as Marxist and feminist history.

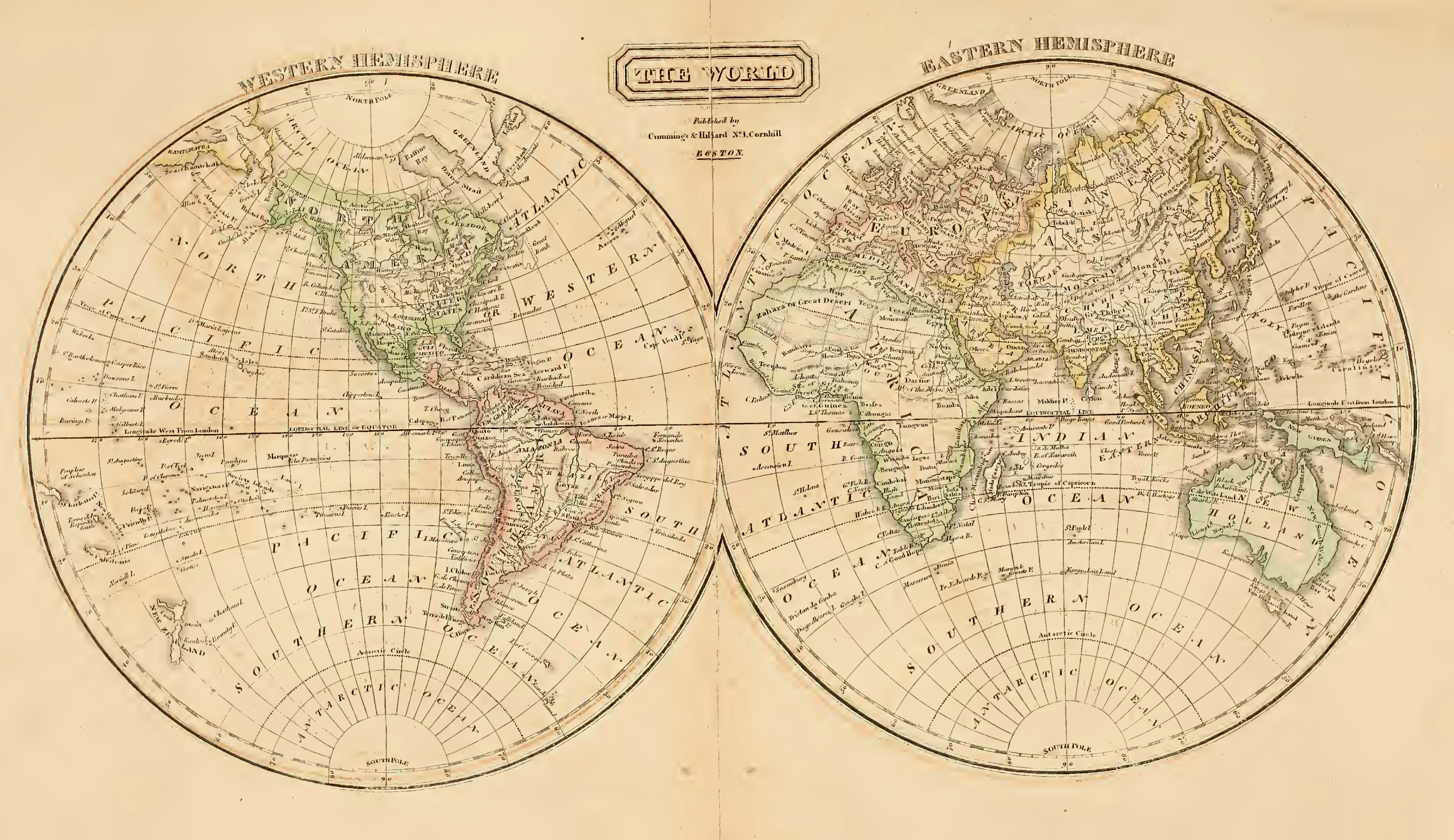
World history examines history on a global level, incorporating the whole of human history.

Some distinctions focus on the scope of the studied topic. Big History is the branch with the broadest scope, covering everything from the Big Bang to the present, incorporating elements of cosmology, geology, biology, and anthropology. World history is another branch with a wide scope. It examines human history as a whole, starting with the evolution of human-like species. The terms macrohistory, mesohistory, and microhistory refer to different scales of analysis, ranging from large-scale patterns that affect the whole globe to detailed studies of local contexts, small communities, family histories, particular individuals, or specific events. Closely related to microhistory is the genre of historical biography, which recounts an individual's life in its historical context and the legacy it left.

Public history involves activities that present history to the general public. It usually happens outside the traditional academic settings in contexts like museums, historical sites, heritage tourism, and popular media.

== Evolution of the discipline ==
Before the invention of writing, the preservation and transmission of historical knowledge were limited to oral traditions. Early forms of historical writing mixed facts with mythological elements, such as the Epic of Gilgamesh from ancient Mesopotamia and the Odyssey, an ancient Greek text attributed to Homer. Published in the 5th century BCE, the Histories by Herodotus (Note: Herodotus is traditionally considered the "father of history" but has also been called the "father of lies" because not all of his accounts were reliable.) was one of the foundational texts of the Western historical tradition, putting more emphasis on rational and evidence-based inquiry than the stories of Homer and other poets. Thucydides followed and further refined Herodotus's approach but focused more on particular political and military developments in contrast to the wide scope and ethnographic elements of Herodotus's work. Roman historiography was heavily influenced by Greek traditions. It often included not only historical facts but also moral judgements of historical figures. (Note: This aspect is also found to some degree in works of Greek historians, including Herodotus and Polybius.) Early Roman historians used an annalistic style, arranging past events by year with little commentary, while later ones preferred a more narrative and analytical approach.

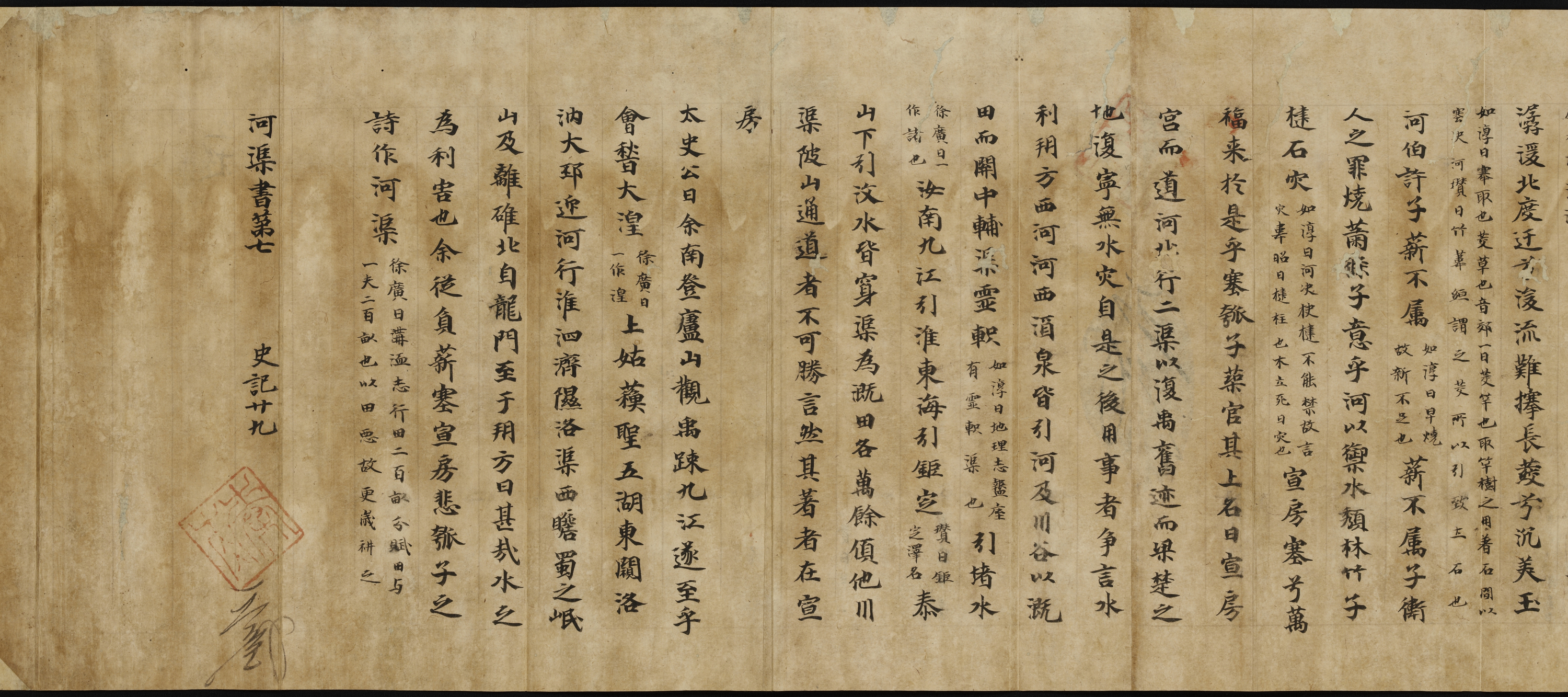
Sima Qian's Shiji or Records of the Grand Historian was a foundational work in Chinese historiography.

Another complex tradition of historical writing emerged in ancient China, with early precursors starting in the late 2nd millennium BCE. It considered annals the highest form of historical writing and emphasized verification through sources. This tradition was associated with Confucian philosophy and closely tied to the government in the form of the ruling dynasty, each responsible for writing the official history of its predecessor. Chinese historians established a coherent and systematic method for recording historical events earlier than other traditions. Of particular influence was the work of Sima Qian, whose meticulous research method and inclusion of alternative viewpoints shaped subsequent historiographical standards. In ancient India, historical narratives were closely associated with religion. They often mixed factual accounts with supernatural elements, as seen in works like the Mahabharata.

In Europe during the medieval period, history was primarily documented by the clergy in the form of chronicles. Christian historians drew from Greco-Roman and Jewish traditions and reinterpreted the past from a religious perspective as a narrative highlighting God's divine plan. Influential contributions shaping this tradition were made by the historians Eusebius of Caesarea and Bede and by the theologian Augustine of Hippo. In the Islamic world, historical writing was similarly influenced by religion, interpreting the past from a Muslim perspective. It placed great importance on the chain of transmission to preserve the authority of historical accounts. Al-Tabari wrote a comprehensive history, spanning from the creation of the world to his present day. Ibn Khaldun reflected on philosophical issues underlying the practice of historians, such as universal patterns shaping historical changes and the limits of historical truth.

With the emergence of the Tang dynasty (618–907 CE) in China, historical writing became increasingly institutionalized as a bureau for the writing of history was established in 629 CE. The bureau oversaw the establishment of Veritable Records, a comprehensive compilation serving as the basis of the standard national history. Tang dynasty historians emphasized the difference between actual events that occurred in the past and the way these events are documented in historical texts. Historical writing in the Song dynasty (960–1279 CE) happened in a variety of historical genres, including encyclopaedias, biographies, and historical novels, while history became a standard subject in the Chinese educational system. Influenced by the Chinese model, a tradition of historical writing emerged in Japan in the 8th century CE. Like in China, historical writing was closely related to the imperial household, but Japanese historians placed less importance on critical source evaluation than their Chinese counterparts.

During the Renaissance and the early modern period (approximately 1500 to 1800), the different historical traditions came increasingly into contact with each other. Starting in 14th-century Europe, the Renaissance led to a shift away from medieval religious outlooks towards a renewed interest in the earlier classical tradition of Greece and Rome. Renaissance humanists used sophisticated text criticism to scrutinize earlier religious historical works, which contributed to the secularization of historical writing. During the 15th to 17th centuries, historians placed greater emphasis on the didactic role of history, using it to promote the established order or argue for a return to an idealized vision of the past. As the invention of the printing press made written documents more accessible and affordable, interest in history expanded outside the clergy and nobility. At the same time, empiricist thought associated with the Scientific Revolution questioned the possibility of arriving at universal historical truths. During the Age of Enlightenment in the 18th century, historical writing was influenced by rationalism and scepticism. Aiming to challenge traditional authority and dogma through reason and empirical methods, historians tried to uncover deeper patterns and meaning in the past, while the scope of historical inquiry expanded with an increased focus on societal and economic topics as well as comparisons between different cultures.

In China during the Ming dynasty (1368–1644), public interest in historical writings and their availability also increased. In addition to the continuation of the Veritable Records by official governmental historians, non-official works by private scholars flourished. These scholars tended to use a more creative style and sometimes challenged orthodox accounts. In the Islamic world, new traditions of historical writings emerged in the Safavid, Mughal, and Ottoman Empires. Meanwhile, in the Americas, European explorers recorded and interpreted indigenous narratives, which had been passed down through oral and pictographic practices. These views sometimes contested traditional European perspectives.

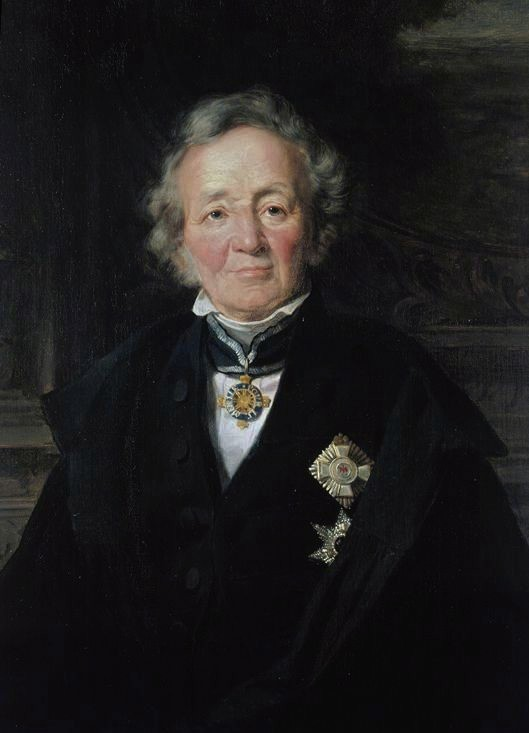
Leopold von Ranke revolutionized the standards of historical scholarship by introducing a thorough evaluation of primary sources.

Historical writing was transformed in the 19th century as it became more professional and science-oriented. Following the work of Leopold von Ranke, a systematic method of source criticism was widely accepted while academic institutions dedicated to history were established in the form of university departments, professional associations, and journals. In tune with this scientific outlook, Auguste Comte formulated the school of positivism and aimed to discover general laws of history, similar to the laws of nature studied by physicists. Building on the philosophy of Georg Wilhelm Friedrich Hegel, Karl Marx proposed one such general law in his theory of historical materialism, arguing that economic forces and class struggle are the fundamental drivers of historical change. Another influential development was the spread of European historiographical methods, which became the dominant approach to the academic study of the past worldwide.

In the 20th century, traditional historical assumptions and practices were challenged while the scope of historical research broadened. The Annales school used insights from sociology, psychology, and economics to study long-term developments. Authoritarian regimes, like Nazi Germany, the Soviet Union, and China, manipulated historical narratives for ideological purposes. Various historians covered unconventional perspectives, focusing on the experiences of marginalized groups through approaches such as history from below, microhistory, oral history, and feminist history. Postcolonialism aimed to undermine the hegemony of the Western approach, and postmodernism rejected the claim to a single universal truth in history. Intellectual historians examined the historical development of ideas. In the second half of the century, renewed attempts to write histories of the world as a whole gained momentum, while technological advances fostered the growth of quantitative and digital history.

== Related fields ==
=== Historiography ===
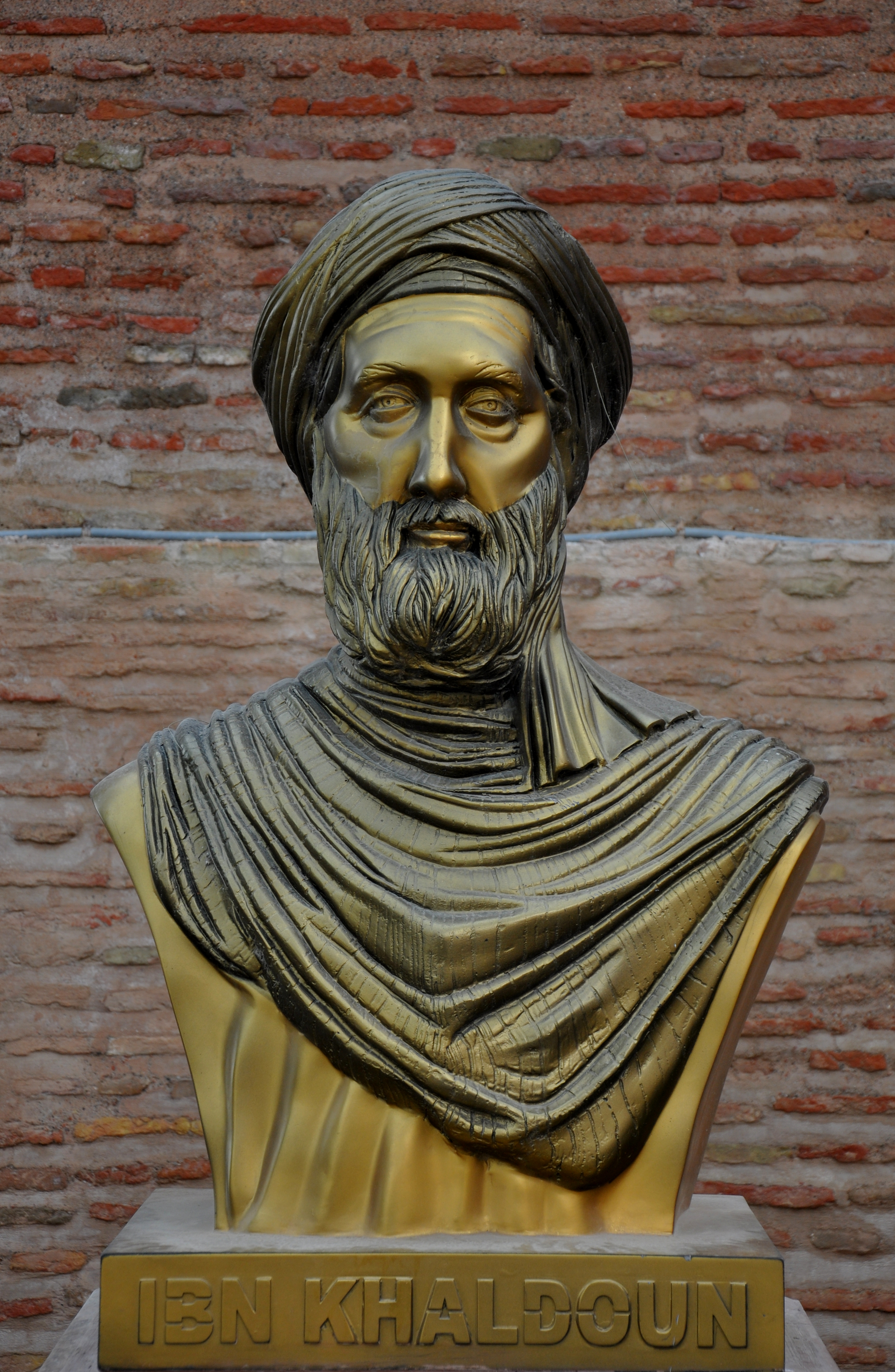
Ibn Khaldun was an influential figure in Islamic historiography.

Historiography is the study of the methods and development of historical research. Historiographers examine what historians do, resulting in a metatheory in the form of a history of history. Some theorists use the term historiography in a different sense to refer to written accounts of the past.

A central topic in historiography as a metatheory focuses on the standards of evidence and reasoning in historical inquiry. Historiographers examine and codify how historians use sources to construct narratives about the past, including the analysis of the interpretative assumptions from which they proceed. Closely related issues include the style and rhetorical presentation of works of history.

By comparing the works of different historians, historiographers identify schools of thought based on shared research methods, assumptions, and styles. For example, they examine the characteristics of the Annales school, like its use of quantitative data from various disciplines and its interest in economic and social developments taking place over extended periods. Comparisons also extend to whole eras from ancient to modern times. This way, historiography traces the development of history as an academic discipline, highlighting how the dominant methods, themes, and research goals have changed over time.

=== Philosophy of history ===
The philosophy of history (Note: Historical theory is a closely related term sometimes used as a synonym.) investigates the theoretical foundations of history. It is interested both in the past itself as a series of interconnected events and in the academic field studying this process. Insights and approaches from various branches of philosophy are relevant to this endeavour, such as metaphysics, epistemology, hermeneutics, and ethics.

In examining history as a process, philosophers explore the basic entities that make up historical phenomena. Some approaches rely primarily on the beliefs and actions of individual humans, while others include collective and other general entities, such as civilizations, institutions, ideologies, and social forces. A related topic concerns the nature of causal mechanisms connecting historic events with their causes and consequences. One view holds that there are general laws of history that determine the course of events, similar to the laws of nature studied in the natural sciences. According to another perspective, causal relations between historic events are unique and shaped by contingent factors. Historically, some philosophers have suggested that the general direction of the course of history follows large patterns. According to one proposal, history is cyclic, meaning that on a sufficiently large scale, individual events or general trends repeat. Another such theory asserts that history is a linear, teleological process moving towards a predetermined goal. (Note: Some philosophers have followed Francis Fukuyama in arguing that the "end of history" has already arrived based on the claim that the ideological evolution of humanity has reached its endpoint.)

The topics of philosophy of history and historiography overlap as both are interested in the standards of historical reasoning. Historiographers typically focus more on describing specific methods and developments encountered in the study of history. Philosophers of history, by contrast, tend to explore more general patterns, including evaluative questions about which methods and assumptions are correct. Historical reasoning is sometimes used in philosophy and other disciplines as a method to explain phenomena. This approach, known as historicism, argues that understanding something requires knowledge of its unique history or how it evolved. For instance, historicism about truth states that truth depends on historical circumstances, meaning that there are no transhistorical truths. Historicism contrasts with approaches that seek a timeless and universal understanding of their subject matter.

==== Historical objectivity ====
Diverse debates in the philosophy of history focus on the possibility of an objective account of history. Various theorists argue that this ideal is not achievable, pointing to the subjective nature of interpretation, the narrative aspect of history, and the influence of personal values and biases on the perspective and actions of both historical individuals and historians. According to one view, some particular facts are objective, for example, facts about when a drought occurred or which army was defeated. However, this view does not ensure general objectivity since historians have to interpret and synthesize facts to arrive at an overall narrative describing large trends and developments. As a result, some historians, such as G. M. Trevelyan and Keith Jenkins, assert that all history is biased, arguing that historical narratives are never free of subjective presuppositions and value judgements.

Some outlooks associated with realism, empiricism, and reconstructionism, conceptualize history as the search for truth or knowledge, which they see as recoverable through rigorous evaluation and careful interpretation of evidence. (Note: The German historian Leopold von Ranke was among the most important proponents of this scientific approach in the 19th century. Key modern scholars taking this view include Sir Geoffrey Elton, Arthur Marwick and E. P. Thompson.) Other scholars critique this view, emphasizing the subjective and partial nature of historical knowledge. (Note: These critiques rest on arguments including that: it is impossible to recover the totality of the past; as events have already passed, accounts cannot be verified against events but against other accounts; historical writing is mediated and constructed by the historian and the process of narrative construction involves interpretation and selective readings; and evidence itself is necessarily subjective as its content is mediated through its maker and its survival through processes of selection. From this viewpoint, hindsight and modern theorizing also allow historians to piece together evidence and put forward interpretations that are only visible after the fact and do so from a biased perspective, meaning that history as the known past is a human creation.) Perspectivists claim that historical perspectives are inherently subjective, as they require selecting particular sources and inquiries, and ascertaining what information can be regarded as historical fact. They argue that statements can only be objective within or relative to one of several competing historical perspectives. A stronger scepticist or relativist outlook states that no historical knowledge can be proven objective. (Note: Among the proponents of the more relativist viewpoint was E. H. Carr, whose What Is History? (1961) examined how historical and social contexts impact the way historians choose and analyse facts.) This emphasis on subjectivities has been extended by postmodernist theories that suggest that it is impossible to know the past objectively, adding that meaning is created through human-made texts, the language of which "constitute[s] our world as we perceive it". (Note: Some scholars argue that recognising the subjective nature of historical sources has the benefit of opening up new areas of research and new ways of engaging with historical subjects; it also provides new approaches for analysing sources, critiquing dominant narratives, and allowing historians to engage with different concepts.) Neo-realists have responded to this trend by reemphasizing the centrality of empiricist methodologies to historical analysis. They acknowledge the influence of subjective evaluations but contend that historical truth is reachable nonetheless. (Note: Scholars advocating for this view include Richard J. Evans.)

=== Education ===
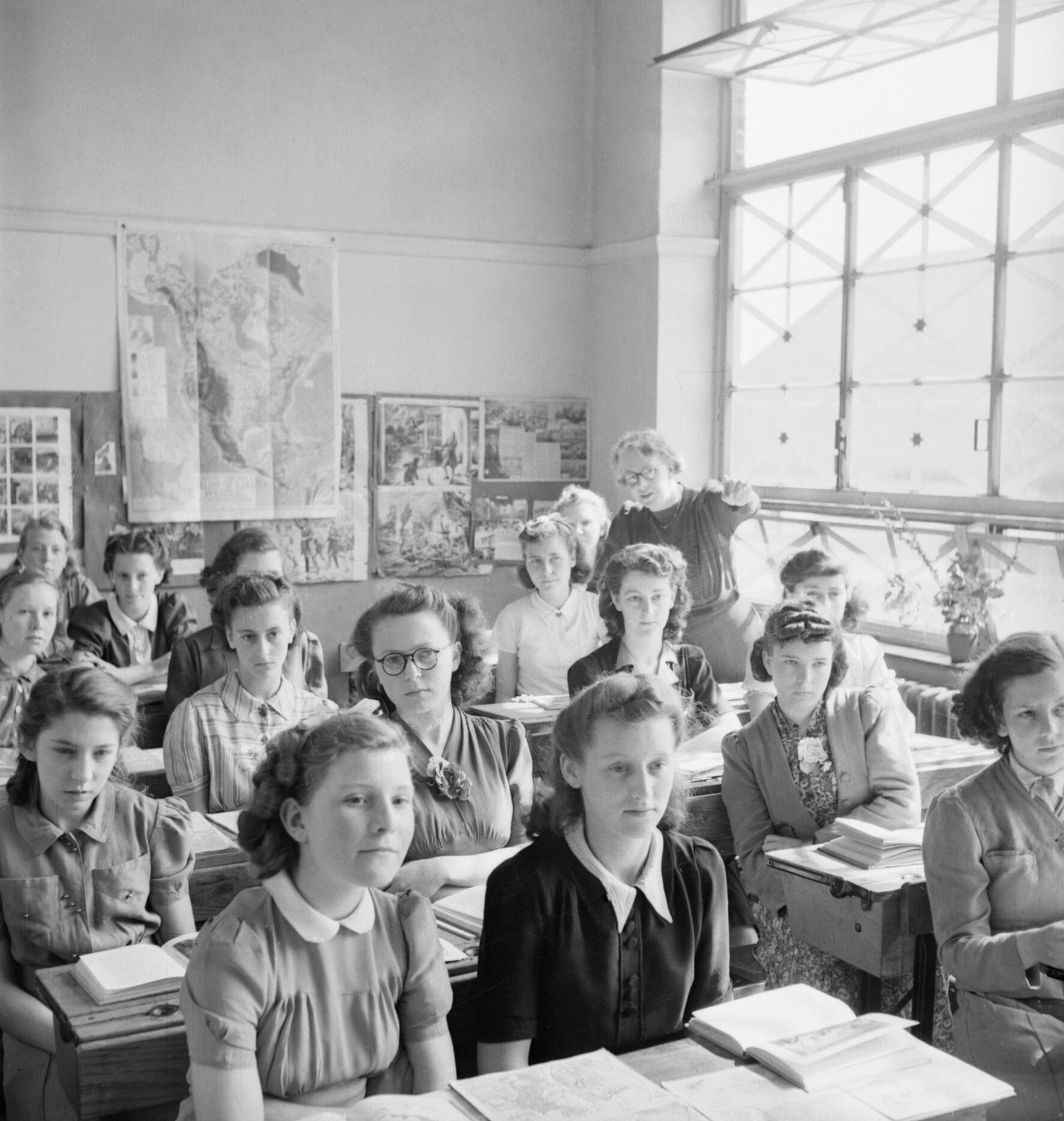
History is a standard school subject in most countries.

History is part of the public school curriculum in most countries. Early history education aims to make students interested in the past and familiarize them with fundamental concepts of historical thought. By fostering a basic historical awareness, it seeks to instill a sense of identity by helping them understand their cultural roots. It often takes a narrative form by presenting children with simple stories, which may focus on historical individuals or the origins of local holidays, festivals, and food. More advanced history education encountered in secondary school covers a broader spectrum of topics, ranging from ancient to modern history, at both local and global levels. It further aims to acquaint students with historical research methodologies, including the ability to interpret and critically evaluate historical claims. History is part of the social science or humanities curriculum at most universities. In addition to teaching students, faculty typically have research roles.

History teachers employ a variety of teaching methods. They include narrative presentations of historical developments, questions to engage students and prompt critical thinking, and discussions on historical topics. Students work with historical sources directly to learn how to analyse and interpret evidence, both individually and in group activities. They engage in historical writing to develop the skills of articulating their thoughts clearly and persuasively. Assessment through oral or written tests aims to ensure that learning goals are reached. Traditional methodologies in history education often present numerous facts, like dates of significant events and names of historical figures, which students are expected to memorize. Some modern approaches, by contrast, seek to foster a more active engagement and a deeper interdisciplinary understanding of general patterns, focusing not only on what happened but also on why it happened and its lasting historical significance.

History education in state schools serves a variety of purposes. A key skill is historical literacy, the ability to comprehend, critically analyse, and respond to historical claims. By making students aware of significant developments in the past, they can become familiar with various contexts of human life, helping them understand the present and its diverse cultures. At the same time, history education can foster a sense of cultural identity by connecting students with their heritage, traditions, and practices, for example, by introducing them to iconic elements ranging from national landmarks and monuments to historical figures and traditional festivities. Knowledge of a shared past and cultural heritage can contribute to the formation of a national identity and prepare students for active citizenship. This political aspect of history education may spark disputes about which topics school textbooks should cover. In various regions, it has resulted in so-called history wars over the curriculum. It can lead to a biased treatment of controversial topics in an attempt to present their national heritage in a favourable light. (Note: For example, some Japanese high school history textbooks have faced various criticisms for downplaying Japan's colonial and wartime activities.)

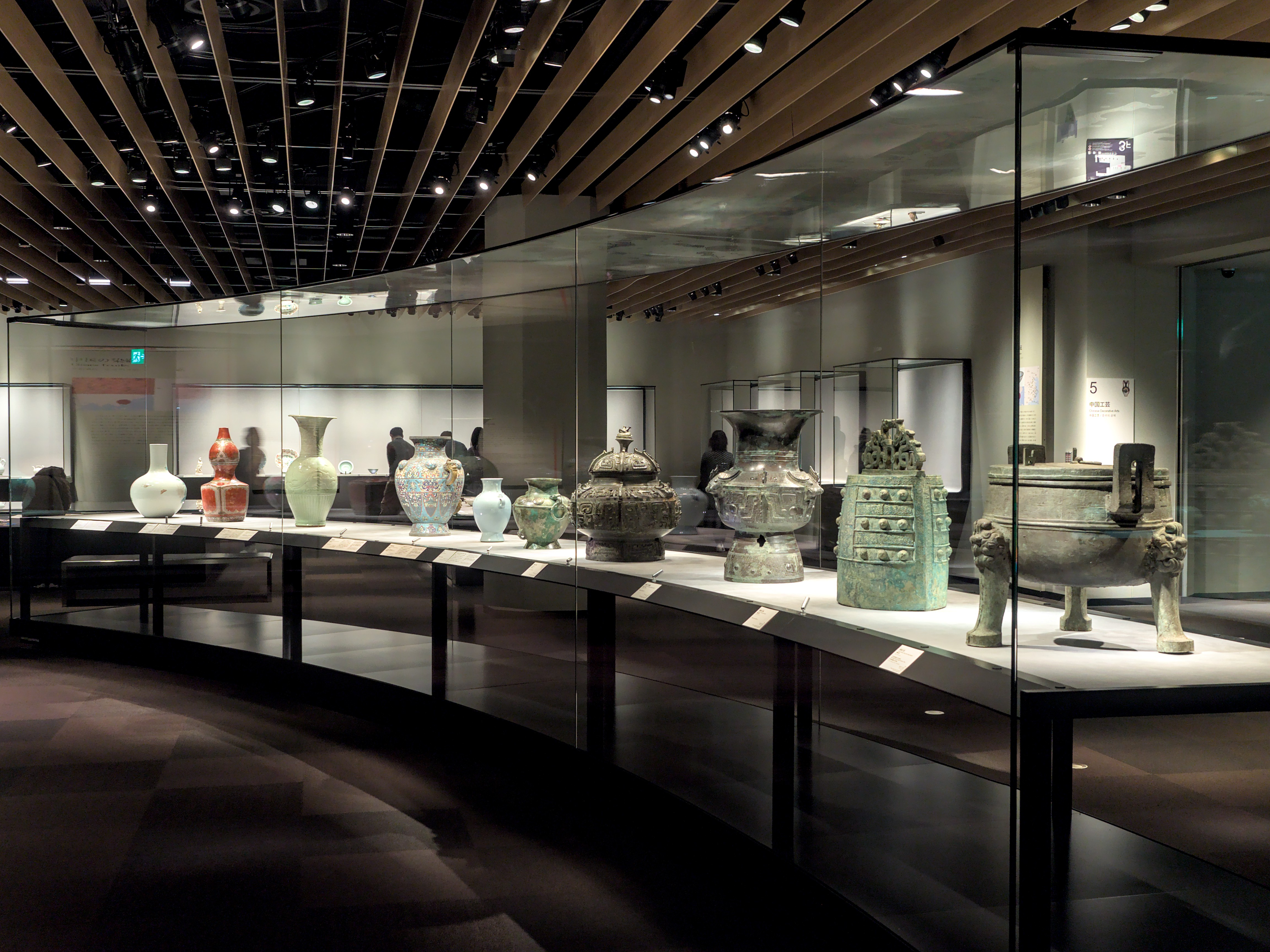
Informal education provided by exhibitions of historic artefacts in museums is part of public history.

In addition to the formal education provided in public schools, history is also taught in informal settings outside the classroom. Public history takes place in locations like museums and memorial sites, where selected artefacts are often used to tell specific stories. It includes popular history, which aims to make the past accessible and appealing to a wide audience of non-specialists in media such as books, television programmes, and online content. Informal history education also happens in oral traditions as narratives about the past are transmitted across generations.

=== Other fields ===
History employs an interdisciplinary methodology, drawing on findings from fields such as archaeology, geology, genetics, anthropology, and linguistics. (Note: They are sometimes grouped under the label auxiliary sciences of history.) Archaeologists study human-made historical artefacts and other forms of material culture. Their findings provide crucial insights into past human activities and cultural developments. The interpretation of archaeological evidence presents challenges that differ from standard historical work with written documents. At the same time, it offers new possibilities by presenting information that was not recorded, allowing historians to access the past of non-literate societies and marginalized groups within literate societies by studying the remains of their material culture. Before the advent of modern archaeology in the 19th century, antiquarianism laid the groundwork for this discipline and played a vital role in preserving historical artefacts.

Geology and other earth sciences help historians understand the environmental contexts and physical processes that affected past societies, including climate conditions, landscapes, and natural events. Genetics provides key information about the evolutionary origins of humans as a species, human migration, ancestry, and demographic changes. Anthropologists investigate human culture and behaviour, such as social structures, belief systems, and ritual practices. This knowledge offers contexts for the interpretation of historical events. Historical linguistics studies the development of languages over time, which can be crucial for the interpretation of ancient documents and can also provide information about migration patterns and cultural exchanges. Historians further rely on evidence from various other fields belonging to the physical, biological, and social sciences as well as the humanities.

In virtue of its relation to ideology and national identity, history is closely connected to politics, and historical theories can directly impact political decisions. For example, irredentist attempts by one state to annex the territory of another state often rely on historical theories claiming that the disputed territory belonged to the first state in the past. History also plays a central role in so-called historical religions, which base some of their core doctrines on historical events. For instance, Christianity is often categorized as a historical religion because it is centred around historical events surrounding Jesus Christ. History is relevant to many fields through the study of their past, including the history of science, mathematics, philosophy, and art.

== See also ==
- Glossary of history
- Outline of history
