= Quantitative history =

Method of historical research

Quantitative history is a method of historical research that uses quantitative, statistical and computer resources. It is a type of the social science history and has four major journals: Historical Methods (1967– ), Journal of Interdisciplinary History (1968– ), the Social Science History (1976– ), and Cliodynamics: The Journal of Quantitative History and Cultural Evolution (2010– ).

Quantitative historians use databases as their main sources of information. Large quantities of political, economic and demographic data are available in print or manuscript format, such as census information on individuals, and election returns. Large quantities have been converted into computer databases. The largest repository presently is the Inter-university Consortium for Political and Social Research (ICPSR) of the University of Michigan, which provides access to an extensive collection of downloadable political and social data for the United States and the world. Quantitative historians use statistical methods to find patterns of human behavior covering all sectors of society, not just the elites who create documents preserved in traditional archive.

== Data bases ==
Content analysis is a technique borrowed from journalism research whereby text from newspapers, magazines or similar sources are coded numerically according to a standardized list of topics.

== Economic history ==
Economic historians use major data sets, especially those collected by governments since the 1920s. Historians of slavery have used census data, sales receipts and price information to reconstruct the economic history of slavery.

== Political history ==
Quantifiers study topics like voting behavior of groups in elections, the roll call behavior of legislators, public opinion distribution, and the occurrence rate of wars and legislation. Collective biography uses standardized information for a large group to deduce patterns of thought and behavior.

== Social history ==
Social historians using quantitative methods (sometimes termed "new social historians", as they were "new" during the 1960s) use census data and other data sets to study entire populations. Topics include demographic issues such as population growth rates, rates of birth, death, marriage and disease, occupational and education distributions, genealogy and migrations and population changes.

A challenging technique is that of associating occurrences of the name of a given person ("nominal record linkage") whose information appears in multiple sources such as censuses, city directories, employment files and voting registration lists.

Cliodynamics is the application of scientific method to the study of history, combining insights from cultural evolution, macrosociology, and economic history/cliometrics to produce and analyse large quantitative datasets and identify general principles about the evolutionary dynamics and functioning of historical societies.

== See also ==
- Cliodynamics
- Demographic history
- Digital history
- H-Net
- Historiometrics
- Modifiable temporal unit problem
- New economic history
- Qualitative geography
- Quantitative geography
- Time geography

== Bibliography ==
- Aydelotte, William O., Allan G. Bogue, and Robert William Fogel, eds. The Dimensions of Quantitative Research in History (Princeton UP, 1972). Essays by leading pioneers with case studies in the social, political, and economic development of the United States, France, and Great Britain.
- Campbell, D'Ann, and Richard Jensen. "Community and Family History at the Newberry Library: Some Solutions to a National Need." The History Teacher 11.1 (1977): 47-54. online
- Clubb, Jerome M., Erik W. Austin, and Gordon W. Kirk, Jr. The Process of Historical Inquiry: Everyday Lives of Working Americans (Columbia University Press, 1989). Uses case study of American textile workers in 1888-90
- Clubb, J. M., and E. K. Scheuch (eds.) Historical Sozial Research: The Use of Historical and Process-Produced Data, Stuttgart 1980, European emphasis
- Crymble, Adam Technology and the Historian: Transformations in the Digital Age (U of Illinois Press, 2021)
- Dollar, Charles, and Richard Jensen. Historian's Guide to Statistics, (Holt, 1971; Krieger 1973); detailed textbook of quantitative political and social history with bibliography
- Erickson, Charlotte. "Quantitative history." American Historical Review 80.2 (1975): 351-365.
- Floud, Roderick. "Quantitative history: Evolution of methods and techniques." Journal of the Society of Archivists 5.7 (1977): 407-417.
- Fogel, Robert William. "The limits of quantitative methods in history." American Historical Review 80.2 (1975): 329-350. Focus on economic history.
- Fogel, Robert William and G. R. Elton, Which Road to the Past: Two Views of History (Yale University Press, 1983). Debate over merits.
- Furet, François. "Quantitative history." Daedalus (1971): 151-167. The uses in France.
- Haskins, Loren and Kirk Jeffrey. Understanding Quantitative History (M.I.T. Press, 1990). textbook
- Hollingsworth, T.H. Historical Demography. Hodder & Stoughton, London 1969
- Hudson, Pat. History by Numbers: An Introduction to Quantitative Approaches (Arnold, 2000). Comprehensive textbook; examples drawn mainly from British sources.
- Jarausch, Konrad H. "The International Dimension of Quantitative History: Some Introductory Reflections." Social Science History 8.2 (1984): 123-132.
- Jarausch, Konrad H. and Kenneth A. Hardy, Quantitative Methods for Historians: A Guide to Research, Data, and Statistics (University of North Carolina Press, 1991). textbook
- Jensen, Richard. "The Accomplishments of the Newberry Library Family and Community History Programs: An Interview with Richard Jensen." The Public Historian 5.4 (1983): 49-61. online
- Kimberly A. Neuendorf. The Content Analysis Guidebook (2002)
- Kousser, J.M., "History QUASSHed: quantitative social scientific history." American Behavioral Scientist 23(1980), p. 885-904
- Lorwin, Val R. and. J. M. Price, ed. The Dimensions of the Past: Materials, Problems and Opportunities for Quantitative Work in History, Yale UP 1972
- Monkkonen, Eric H. "The challenge of quantitative history." Historical Methods: A Journal of Quantitative and Interdisciplinary History 17.3 (1984): 86-94.
- Rowney, D.K., (ed.) Quantitative History: Selected Readings in the Quantitative Analysis of Historical Data, 1969
- Swierenga, Robert P., ed. Quantification in American History: Theory and Research (Atheneum, 1970). Early essays on methodology, and examples of political, economic, and social history.
- Wrigley, E.A. (ed.) Identifying People in the Past. Edward Arnold, 1973. Using demographic and census data

== Other sources ==
- Grinin, L. 2007. Periodization of History: A theoretic-mathematical analysis. In: History & Mathematics: Analyzing and Modeling Global Development. Edited by Leonid Grinin, Victor C. de Munck, and Andrey Korotayev. Moscow: KomKniga, 2006. P.10-38. ISBN 978-5-484-01001-1.
- Kimberly A. Neuendorf. (2002). The Content Analysis Guidebook. Los Angeles: Sage.
- Moyal, J.E. (1949) The distribution of wars in time. Journal of the Royal Statistical Society, 112, 446-458.
- Richardson, L. F. (1960). Statistics of deadly quarrels. Pacific Grove, CA: Boxwood Press.
- Silver, N. C. & Hittner, J. B. (1998). Guidebook of statistical software for the social and behavioral sciences. Boston, MA: Allyn & Bacon.
- Turchin, P., et al., eds. (2007). History & Mathematics: Historical Dynamics and Development of Complex Societies. Moscow: KomKniga. ISBN 5-484-01002-0
- Turchin, Peter (2018). "Fitting Dynamic Regression Models to Seshat Data". Cliodynamics. 9 (1): 25–58. doi:10.21237/C7clio9137696.
- Wilkinson, D. (1980). Deadly Quarrels: Lewis F. Richardson and the Statistical Study of War. Berkeley, CA: University of California Press.
- Wright, Q. (1965). A Study of War. 2nd ed. Chicago: University of Chicago Press.
