= Arthur Marwick =

British social historian

Arthur John Brereton Marwick FRHistS (29 February 1936 – 27 September 2006) was a British social historian, who served for many years as Professor of History at the Open University. His research interests lay primarily in the history of Britain in the twentieth century, and the relationship between war and social change. He is probably best known, however, for his more theoretical book The Nature of History (1970; revised editions 1981 and 1989), and its greatly reworked and expanded version The New Nature of History (2001). In the latter work he defended an empirical and source-based approach towards the writing of history, and argued against the turn towards postmodernism. He believed firmly that history was "of central importance to society".

== Early life and education ==
Marwick was born on 29 February 1936 in Edinburgh, the younger son of William Hutton Marwick (1894–1982), an economic historian, and his wife, Maeve Cluna, née Brereton. His parents were Quakers. He was educated at George Heriot's School, Edinburgh, and at the University of Edinburgh, before undertaking postgraduate research at Balliol College, Oxford. His Oxford thesis, on the Independent Labour Party, was awarded a BLitt, but not a doctorate.

== Career ==
Marwick worked as an assistant lecturer in history at the University of Aberdeen in 1959–60, before becoming a lecturer in history at the University of Edinburgh in 1960. In 1969 he was appointed the first professor of history at the newly established Open University, where he remained until his retirement in 2001. From 1978 until 1984 he served as dean and director of studies in arts at the Open University. He also held brief visiting professorships at the State University of New York at Buffalo, Stanford University, Rhodes College, the University of Perugia and the École des Hautes Études en Sciences Sociales in Paris.

From 1995 to 1998 he served as co-editor of the Journal of Contemporary History.

== Scholarship ==
Marwick was a left-wing social and cultural historian, but critical of Marxism and other approaches to history that he believed stressed the importance of metanarrative over archival research. He was also a critic of postmodernism.

=== Taxonomy of sources ===
Particularly in his books The Nature of History (1970), and its expanded version The New Nature of History (2001), Marwick analysed at length different types of historical evidence, distinguishing between "facts" and sources, primary and secondary sources, and different varieties of primary source. He also distinguished between "witting" and "unwitting" testimony; that is, between the overt and intentional message of a document or source, and the unintentional evidence that it also contains.

=== War and social change ===
One of Marwick's most influential books, The Deluge (1965), dealt with the transformations in British society brought about by the First World War. Its main thesis was that the war had brought about positive and lasting social changes (in the rôle of women, in the acceptability of state intervention for social reasons, and so on). Despite its terrible tragedies, Marwick believed that the sum result of the war was that Britain was a better place to live in the 1920s than in the period before the war.

He analysed the social changes that result from total war in terms of four different "modes", or dimensions:

- The destructive and disruptive aspects of war, which may nonetheless provide "an impetus to social construction on an entirely new scale".
- War as a challenge to, and test of, a country's social and political institutions, which may prompt the destruction of inefficient institutions and the improved efficiency of others.
- The improved opportunities for participation in social, political and economic life of previously disadvantaged sectors of society (for example, women and the working classes).
- The emotional and psychological impact of war that may in some cases stimulate creativity, and a greater willingness to adopt new ways of thinking.

=== Beauty ===
Marwick published two books on historical perceptions of human beauty – Beauty in History (1988) and It: a History of Human Beauty (2004) – in which he attacked the feminist argument that beauty is merely a social construct. His first book was heavily criticised by feminists, including Angela Carter, who sarcastically proposed as a subtitle: "Women I have fancied throughout the ages with additional notes on some of the men I think I might have fancied if I were a woman."

== Personal life ==
Marwick had a flamboyant and outgoing personality. A. W. Purdue described him as "alternatively, wonderful, outrageous and dangerous to know. Kind and supportive to colleagues, he was an heroic drinker but not always fun after the first few drinks." Jonathan Meades called him "the very picture of baba-cool, with his daringly arty shirt, negligently loose foulard and his beardy grin for which the only word is that late Sixties shocker 'mellow'". His colleague Clive Emsley, however, recalled a more complex character:

He could be a prickly individual. He took criticism badly and remembered those who had made it. But the sixties' persona also concealed a shy and in many ways an insecure man. Most of those who were taught by him found him inspirational. Most of those who worked alongside him, while recognizing that, at times, he could be hurtful and embarrassing, would agree that much more often he was kind and generous.

He had many girlfriends and lovers, but never married. He had one daughter, Louise.

His ashes were interred in 2007 on the eastern side of Highgate Cemetery.

== Principal works ==
- The Explosion of British Society 1914–62 (1963); revised as The Explosion of British Society 1914–1970 (1971)
- Clifford Allen: the open conspirator (1964)
- The Deluge: British Society and the First World War (1965)
- Britain in the Century of Total War: war, peace and social change, 1900–1967 (1968)
- The Nature of History (1970)
- Social Change in Britain, 1920–1970 (1970)
- War and Social Change in the Twentieth Century: a comparative study of Britain, France, Germany, Russia and the United States (1974)
- The Home Front: the British and the Second World War (1976)
- The Unemployed (1976)
- Women At War, 1914–1918 (1977)
- Class: Image and Reality in Britain, France and the USA since 1930 (1980)
- The Illustrated Dictionary of British History, with Christopher Harvie, Charles Kightly, & Keith Wrightson (1980)
- British Society since 1945 (1982)
- Britain in Our Century: images and controversies (1984)
- Class in the Twentieth Century (1986)
- Beauty in History: society, politics and personal appearance c.1500 to the present (1988)
- The Arts, Literature and Society (ed.) (1990)
- Europe on the Eve of War, 1900–1914 (1990)
- Culture in Britain since 1945 (1991)
- The Sixties: Cultural Revolution in Britain, France, Italy, and the United States, c.1958–c.1974 (1998)
- Windows on the Sixties with A. Aldgate and J. Chapman (2000)
- A History of the Modern British Isles, 1914–1999: circumstances, events and outcomes (2000)
- The New Nature of History: knowledge, evidence, language (2001)
- Total War and Historical Change, Europe 1914–1955, edited with Clive Emsley and Wendy Simpson (2001)
- The Arts in the West since 1945 (2002)
- It: a History of Human Beauty (2004)

== Sources ==
- Anon. (4 October 2006). "Professor Arthur Marwick (obituary)". The Telegraph.
- Emsley, Clive (4 October 2006). "Professor Arthur Marwick: Open University founding father (obituary)". The Independent.
- Emsley, Clive (2007). "Obituary: Arthur Marwick 1936–2006". Journal of Contemporary History. 42 (2): 181–184. doi:10.1177/0022009407076298. JSTOR 30036440. S2CID 159997265.
- Emsley, Clive (2011) [2010]. "Marwick, Arthur John Brereton (1936–2006)". Oxford Dictionary of National Biography (online ed.). Oxford University Press. doi:10.1093/ref:odnb/97471. (Subscription or UK public library membership required.)
- Purdue, A. W. (7 October 2006). "Arthur Marwick (obituary)". The Guardian.
