= Source criticism =

Process of evaluating an information source

Source criticism (or information evaluation) is the process of evaluating an information source, i.e.: a document, a person, a speech, a fingerprint, a photo, an observation, or anything used in order to obtain knowledge. In relation to a given purpose, a given information source may be more or less valid, reliable or relevant. Broadly, "source criticism" is the interdisciplinary study of how information sources are evaluated for given tasks.

== Meaning ==
Problems in translation: The Danish word kildekritik, like the Norwegian word kildekritikk and the Swedish word källkritik, derived from the German Quellenkritik and is closely associated with the German historian Leopold von Ranke (1795–1886). Historian Wolfgang Hardtwig wrote:

His [Ranke's] first work Geschichte der romanischen und germanischen Völker von 1494–1514 (History of the Latin and Teutonic Nations from 1494 to 1514) (1824) was a great success. It already showed some of the basic characteristics of his conception of Europe, and was of historiographical importance particularly because Ranke made an exemplary critical analysis of his sources in a separate volume, Zur Kritik neuerer Geschichtsschreiber (On the Critical Methods of Recent Historians). In this work he raised the method of textual criticism used in the late eighteenth century, particularly in classical philology to the standard method of scientific historical writing. (Hardtwig, 2001, p. 12739)

Historical theorist Chris Lorenz wrote:

The larger part of the nineteenth and twentieth centuries would be dominated by the research-oriented conception of historical method of the so-called Historical School in Germany, led by historians as Leopold Ranke and Berthold Niebuhr. Their conception of history, long been regarded as the beginning of modern, 'scientific' history, harked back to the 'narrow' conception of historical method, limiting the methodical character of history to source criticism. (Lorenz, 2001)

In the early 21st century, source criticism is a growing field in, among other fields, library and information science. In this context source criticism is studied from a broader perspective than just, for example, history, classical philology, or biblical studies (but there, too, it has more recently received new attention).

== Principles ==
The following principles are from two Scandinavian textbooks on source criticism, written by the historians Olden-Jørgensen (1998) and Thurén (1997):

- Human sources may be relics (e.g. a fingerprint) or narratives (e.g. a statement or a letter). Relics are more credible sources than narratives.
- A given source may be forged or corrupted; strong indications of the originality of the source increases its reliability.
- The closer a source is to the event which it purports to describe, the more one can trust it to give an accurate description of what really happened
- A primary source is more reliable than a secondary source, which in turn is more reliable than a tertiary source and so on.
- If a number of independent sources contain the same message, the credibility of the message is strongly increased.
- The tendency of a source is its motivation for providing some kind of bias. Tendencies should be minimized or supplemented with opposite motivations.
- If it can be demonstrated that the witness (or source) has no direct interest in creating bias, the credibility of the message is increased.

Two other principles are:

- Knowledge of source criticism cannot substitute for subject knowledge:

"Because each source teaches you more and more about your subject, you will be able to judge with ever-increasing precision the usefulness and value of any prospective source. In other words, the more you know about the subject, the more precisely you can identify what you must still find out". (Bazerman, 1995, p. 304).

- The reliability of a given source is relative to the questions put to it.

"The empirical case study showed that most people find it difficult to assess questions of cognitive authority and media credibility in a general sense, for example, by comparing the overall credibility of newspapers and the Internet. Thus these assessments tend to be situationally sensitive. Newspapers, television and the Internet were frequently used as sources of orienting information, but their credibility varied depending on the actual topic at hand" (Savolainen, 2007).

The following questions are often good ones to ask about any source according to the American Library Association (1994) and Engeldinger (1988):

1. How was the source located?
2. What type of source is it?
3. Who is the author and what are the qualifications of the author in regard to the topic that is discussed?
4. When was the information published?
5. In which country was it published?
6. What is the reputation of the publisher?
7. Does the source show a particular cultural or political bias?

For literary sources complementing criteria are:

1. Does the source contain a bibliography?
2. Has the material been reviewed by a group of peers, or has it been edited?
3. How does the article/book compare with similar articles/books?

== Levels of generality ==
Some principles of source criticism are universal, other principles are specific for certain kinds of information sources.

There is today no consensus about the similarities and differences between source criticism in the natural science and humanities. Logical positivism claimed that all fields of knowledge were based on the same principles. Much of the criticism of logical positivism claimed that positivism is the basis of the sciences, whereas hermeneutics is the basis of the humanities. This was, for example, the position of Jürgen Habermas. A newer position, in accordance with, among others, Hans-Georg Gadamer and Thomas Kuhn, understands both science and humanities as determined by researchers' preunderstanding and paradigms. Hermeneutics is thus a universal theory. The difference is, however, that the sources of the humanities are themselves products of human interests and preunderstanding, whereas the sources of the natural sciences are not. Humanities are thus "doubly hermeneutic".

Natural scientists, however, are also using human products (such as scientific papers) which are products of preunderstanding (and can lead to, for example, academic fraud).

== Contributing fields ==
=== Epistemology ===
Epistemological theories are the basic theories about how knowledge is obtained and are thus the most general theories about how to evaluate information sources.

- Empiricism evaluates sources by considering the observations (or sensations) on which they are based. Sources without basis in experience are not seen as valid.
- Rationalism provides low priority to sources based on observations. In order to be meaningful, observations must be explained by clear ideas or concepts. It is the logical structure and the well definedness that is in focus in evaluating information sources from the rationalist point of view.
- Historicism evaluates information sources on the basis of their reflection of their sociocultural context and their theoretical development.
- Pragmatism evaluate sources on the basis of how their values and usefulness to accomplish certain outcomes. Pragmatism is skeptical about claimed neutral information sources.

The evaluation of knowledge or information sources cannot be more certain than is the construction of knowledge. If one accepts the principle of fallibilism then one also has to accept that source criticism can never 100% verify knowledge claims. As discussed in the next section, source criticism is intimately linked to scientific methods.

The presence of fallacies of argument in sources is another kind of philosophical criterion for evaluating sources. Fallacies are presented by Walton (1998). Among the fallacies are the ad hominem fallacy (the use of personal attack to try to undermine or refute a person's argument) and the straw man fallacy (when one arguer misrepresents another's position to make it appear less plausible than it really is, in order more easily to criticize or refute it.)

=== Research methodology ===
Research methods are methods used to produce scholarly knowledge. The methods that are relevant for producing knowledge are also relevant for evaluating knowledge. An example of a book that turns methodology upside-down and uses it to evaluate produced knowledge is Katzer; Cook & Crouch (1998).

=== Science studies ===
Studies of quality evaluation processes such as peer review, book reviews and of the normative criteria used in evaluation of scientific and scholarly research. Another field is the study of scientific misconduct.

Harris (1979) provides a case study of how a famous experiment in psychology, Little Albert, has been distorted throughout the history of psychology, starting with the author (Watson) himself, general textbook authors, behavior therapists, and a prominent learning theorist. Harris proposes possible causes for these distortions and analyzes the Albert study as an example of myth making in the history of psychology. Studies of this kind may be regarded a special kind of reception history (how Watson's paper was received). It may also be regarded as a kind of critical history (opposed to ceremonial history of psychology, cf. Harris, 1980). Such studies are important for source criticism in revealing the bias introduced by referring to classical studies.

=== Textual criticism ===
Textual criticism (or broader: text philology) is a part of philology, which is not just devoted to the study of texts, but also to edit and produce "scientific editions", "scholarly editions", "standard editions", "historical editions", "reliable editions", "reliable texts", "text editions" or "critical editions", which are editions in which careful scholarship has been employed to ensure that the information contained within is as close to the author's/composer's original intentions as possible (and which allows the user to compare and judge changes in editions published under influence by the author/composer). The relation between these kinds of works and the concept "source criticism" is evident in Danish, where they may be termed "kildekritisk udgave" (directly translated "source critical edition").

In other words, it is assumed that most editions of a given works is filled with noise and errors provided by publishers, why it is important to produce "scholarly editions". The work provided by text philology is an important part of source criticism in the humanities.

=== Psychology ===
The study of eyewitness testimony is an important field of study used, among other purposes, to evaluate testimony in courts. The basics of eyewitness fallibility includes factors such as poor viewing conditions, brief exposure, and stress. More subtle factors, such as expectations, biases, and personal stereotypes can intervene to create erroneous reports. Loftus (1996) discuss all such factors and also shows that eyewitness memory is chronically inaccurate in surprising ways. An ingenious series of experiments reveals that memory can be radically altered by the way an eyewitness is questioned after the fact. New memories can be implanted and old ones unconsciously altered under interrogation.

Anderson (1978) and Anderson & Pichert (1977) reported an elegant experiment demonstrating how change in perspective affected people's ability to recall information that was unrecallable from another perspective.

In psychoanalysis the concept of defence mechanism is important and may be considered a contribution to the theory of source criticism because it explains psychological mechanisms, which distort the reliability of human information sources.

=== Library and information science (LIS) ===
In schools of library and information science (LIS), source criticism is taught as part of the growing field of information literacy.

Issues such as relevance, quality indicators for documents, kinds of documents and their qualities (e.g. scholarly editions) are studied in LIS and are relevant for source criticism. Bibliometrics is often used to find the most influential journal, authors, countries and institutions. Librarians study book reviews and their function in evaluating books.

In library and information science the checklist approach has often been used. A criticism of this approach is given by Meola (2004): "Chucking the checklist".

Libraries sometimes provide advice on how their users may evaluate sources.

The Library of Congress has a "Teaching with Primary Sources" (TPS) program.

=== Ethics ===
Source criticism is also about ethical behavior and culture. It is about a free press and an open society, including the protecting information sources from being persecuted (cf., Whistleblower).

== In specific domains ==
=== Photos ===
Photos are often manipulated during wars and for political purposes. One well known example is Joseph Stalin's manipulation of a photograph from May 5, 1920, on which Stalin's predecessor Lenin held a speech for Soviet troops that Leon Trotsky attended. Stalin had later Trotsky retouched out of this photograph. (cf. King, 1997). A recent example is reported by Healy (2008) about North Korean leader Kim Jong Il.

=== Internet sources ===
Much interest in evaluating Internet sources (such as Wikipedia) is reflected in the scholarly literature of library and information science and in other fields. Mintz (2002) is an edited volume about this issue. Examples of literature examining Internet sources include Chesney (2006), Fritch & Cromwell (2001), Leth & Thurén (2000) and Wilkinson, Bennett, & Oliver (1997).

=== Archaeology and history ===
"In history, the term historical method was first introduced in a systematic way in the sixteenth century by Jean Bodin in his treatise of source criticism, Methodus ad facilem historiarium cognitionem (1566). Characteristically, Bodin's treatise intended to establish the ways by which reliable knowledge of the past could be established by checking sources against one another and by so assessing the reliability of the information conveyed by them, relating them to the interests involved" (Lorenz, 2001, p. 6870).

As written above, modern source criticism in history is closely associated with the German historian Leopold von Ranke (1795–1886), who influenced historical methods on both sides of the Atlantic Ocean, although in rather different ways. American history developed in a more empirist and antiphilosophical way (cf., Novick, 1988).

Two of the best-known rule books from the 19th century are Bernheim (1889) and Langlois & Seignobos (1898). These books provided a seven-step procedure (here quoted from Howell & Prevenier, 2001, p. 70–71):

1. If the sources all agree about an event, historians can consider the event proved.
2. However, majority does not rule; even if most sources relate events in one way, that version will not prevail unless it passes the test of critical textual analysis.
3. The source whose account can be confirmed by reference to outside authorities in some of its parts can be trusted in its entirety if it is impossible similarly to confirm the entire text.
4. When two sources disagree on a particular point, the historian will prefer the source with most "authority"—i.e. the source created by the expert or by the eyewitness.
5. Eyewitnesses are, in general, to be preferred, especially in circumstances where the ordinary observer could have accurately reported what transpired and, more specifically, when they deal with facts known by most contemporaries.
6. If two independently created sources agree on a matter, the reliability of each is measureably enhanced.
7. When two sources disagree (and there is no other means of evaluation), then historians take the source which seems to accord best with common sense.

Gudmundsson (2007, p. 38) wrote: "Source criticism should not totally dominate later courses. Other important perspectives, for example, philosophy of history/view of history, should not suffer by being neglected" (Translated by BH). This quote makes a distinction between source criticism on the one hand and historical philosophy on the other hand. However, different views of history and different specific theories about the field being studied may have important consequences for how sources are selected, interpreted and used. Feminist scholars may, for example, select sources made by women and may interpret sources from a feminist perspective. Epistemology should thus be considered a part of source criticism. It is in particular related to "tendency analysis".

In archaeology, radiocarbon dating is an important technique to establish the age of information sources. Methods of this kind were the ideal when history established itself as both a scientific discipline and as a profession based on "scientific" principles in the last part of the 1880s (although radiocarbon dating is a more recent example of such methods). The empiricist movement in history brought along both "source criticism" as a research method and also in many countries large scale publishing efforts to make valid editions of "source materials" such as important letters and official documents (e.g. as facsimiles or transcriptions).

Historiography and historical method include the study of the reliability of the sources used, in terms of, for example, authorship, credibility of the author, and the authenticity or corruption of the text.

=== Biblical studies ===
Source criticism, as the term is used in biblical criticism, refers to the attempt to establish the sources used by the author and/or redactor of the final text. The term "literary criticism" is occasionally used as a synonym.

Biblical source criticism originated in the 18th century with the work of Jean Astruc, who adapted the methods already developed for investigating the texts of classical antiquity (Homer's Iliad in particular) to his own investigation into the sources of the Book of Genesis. It was subsequently considerably developed by German scholars in what was known as "the higher criticism", a term no longer in widespread use. The ultimate aim of these scholars was to reconstruct the history of the biblical text, as well as the religious history of ancient Israel.

Related to source criticism is redaction criticism which seeks to determine how and why the redactor (editor) put the sources together the way he did. Also related is form criticism and tradition history which try to reconstruct the oral prehistory behind the identified written sources.

=== Journalism ===
Journalists often work with strong time pressure and have access to only a limited number of information sources such as news bureaus, persons which may be interviewed, newspapers, journals and so on (see journalism sourcing). Journalists' possibility for conducting serious source criticism is thus limited compared to, for example, historians' possibilities.

=== Legal studies ===
The most important legal sources are created by parliaments, governments, courts, and legal researchers. They may be written or informal and based on established practices. Views concerning the quality of sources differ among legal philosophies: Legal positivism is the view that the text of the law should be considered in isolation, while legal realism, interpretivism (legal), critical legal studies and feminist legal criticism interprets the law on a broader cultural basis.

== See also ==
- Argumentation theory
- Bias
- Critical thinking
- Deception
- Fabrication (science)
- Exegesis
- Fraud
- Plagiarism
- Psychological warfare
- Q source
- Scholarly method
- Source credibility
