= Julie Walker =

Julia or Julie Walker may refer to:

- Julia Walker (climate scientist) (born 1950), English meteorologist
- Julie White Walker, American state librarian of Georgia
- Julie Ann Walker, American romantic suspense novelist

== Characters ==
- Julia Walker (Brothers & Sisters), television character played by Sarah Jane Morris
- Dr. Julia Walker, played by Kyra Zagorsky on the 2014 television series Helix
