= Unwitting testimony =

Unintentional evidence from historical sources

Unwitting testimony is the unintentional evidence provided by historical sources. It may reflect the attitudes and preconceptions of an author, or the culture to which he or she belongs. The recognition and interpretation of unwitting testimony by historians acknowledges that primary sources may contain flaws as well as several layers of evidence, and that there are messages that are not explicit.

== Origin ==
The phrase "unwitting testimony" was coined by the British historian Arthur Marwick of the Open University. Marwick acknowledged, however, that he had adopted and developed the concept from some earlier remarks made by the American historian of science, Henry Guerlac. Marwick defined it as a feature of historical evidence to be distinguished from "witting testimony", which is the message of the primary source consciously intended to be conveyed by the author. Witting and unwitting testimonies can be applied both to the primary source itself or the historian who is constructing a secondary source.

Unwitting testimony has been employed by historians to establish the beliefs and customs of past societies particularly in their interpretation of words and phrases, which tend to change meaning over time. It does not refer to the testimony itself but the intention of the writer, author or creator of the historical source. The unwitting nature of the testimony include culture-bound views of the observer on events, which some scholars say can lead to a failure in understanding historical texts if ignored. Aside from the author's intent, reader utility is also considered an important factor in unwitting testimony. The concept was also applied to film by Karsten Fledelius, referring to the incidental aspects of reality that slipped into the camera that were unwittingly recorded.
