= Argument from silence =

Argument based on lack of statements

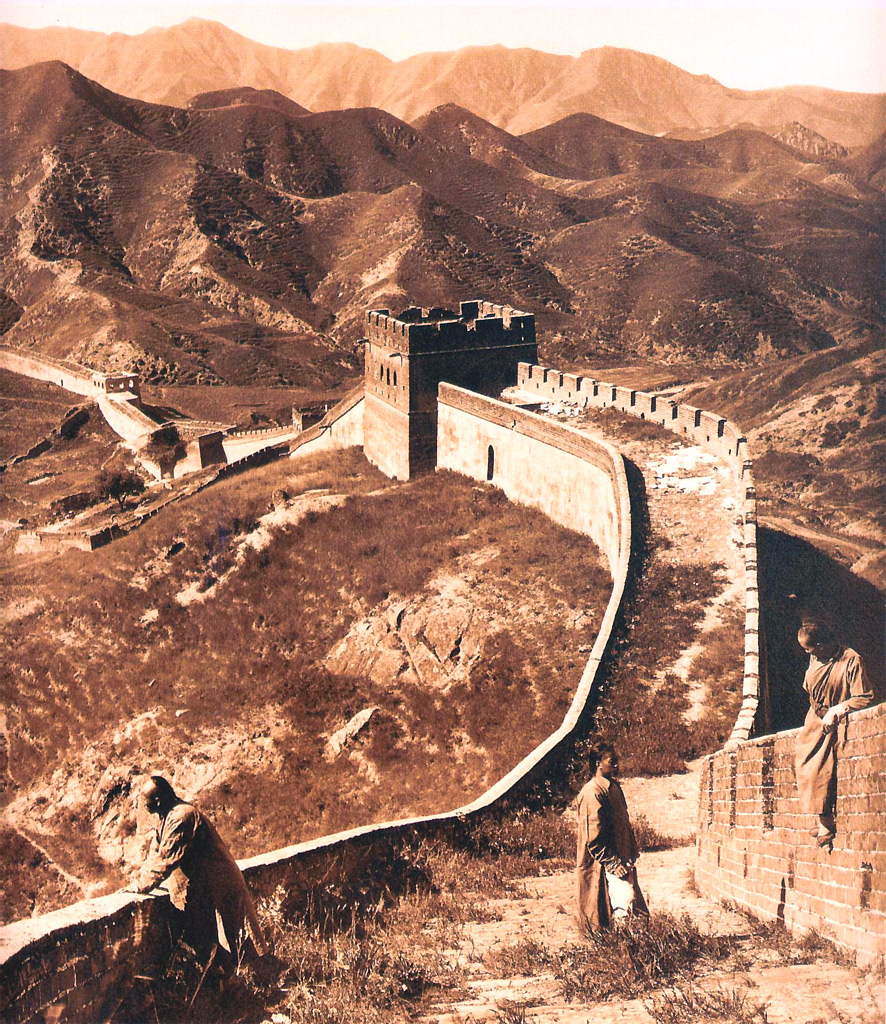
Marco Polo's travel journals are silent on the Great Wall of China, which some believe (against the historical consensus) is evidence of him never visiting the country, or rather exemplifies his gift in diplomatic mindfulness.

To make an argument from silence (Latin: argumentum ex silentio) is to express a conclusion that is based on the absence of statements in historical documents, rather than their presence. In the field of classical studies, it often refers to the assertion that an author is ignorant of a subject, based on the lack of references to it in the author's available writings. Thus, in historical analysis with an argument from silence, the absence of a reference to an event or a document is used to cast doubt on the event not mentioned. A variant of this is the assertion that silence demonstrates universal knowledge and acceptance in the author's time and society, so there was no need to speak. While most historical approaches rely on what an author's works contain, an argument from silence relies on what the book or document does not contain. This approach thus uses what an author "should have said" rather than what is available in the author's extant writings.

An argument from silence may apply to a document only if the author was expected to have the information, was intending to give a complete account of the situation, and the item was important enough and interesting enough to deserve to be mentioned at the time. Arguments from silence, based on a writer's failure to mention an event, are distinct from arguments from ignorance which rely on a total "absence of evidence" and are widely considered unreliable; however arguments from silence themselves are also generally viewed as rather weak in many cases; or considered as fallacies.

== Historical analysis ==
=== Structure of the argument ===
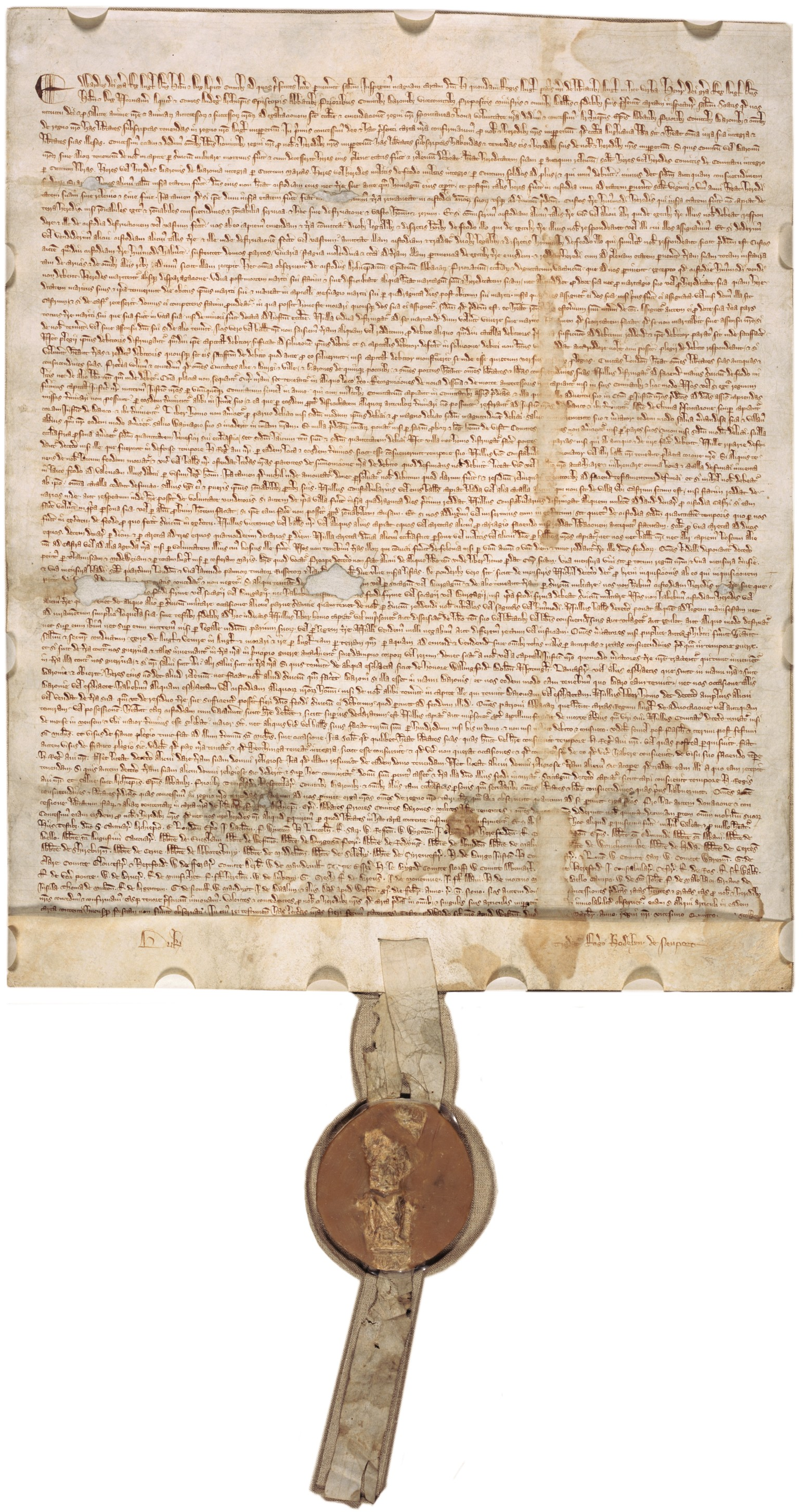
A copy of Magna Carta, 1287

John Lange provided the basic structure for the analysis of arguments from silence based on three components:

- An extant document D in which no reference to an event E appears.
- It is known that the intention of the author of document D was to provide an exhaustive list of all the events in the class of events to which E belongs
- Event E is assumed to be a type of event which the author of D would not have overlooked, had the event taken place.

The applicability of these three conditions is decided on a case-by-case basis, and there are no general dialectical rules for them, except the historian's expertise in evaluating the situation. In Lange's analysis, an argument from silence is only suggestive and never logically conclusive.

Professors of history Martha Howell and Walter Prevenier thus state that an argument from silence can act as presumptive evidence only if the person failing to mention the information was in a position to have the information, and was purporting to be giving a complete account of the story in question. Howell and Prevenier state that arguments from silence face the difficulty that a historian can not just assume that an author would have recorded the fact in question; for if the fact did not seem important enough to an author it would have been excluded.

Professor of English Michael Duncan states that there are very few scholarly analyses of arguments from silence; but these typically view it as fallacious. Duncan adds that arguments from silence are not mentioned in Aristotle's Sophistical Refutations or Hamblin's book Fallacies, but both of these texts discuss the somewhat similar case of argument from ignorance. Errietta Bissa, professor of Classics at University of Wales, flatly states that arguments from silence are not valid. David Henige states that, although risky, such arguments can at times shed light on historical events.

=== Author's interest ===
The importance of an event to a contemporary author plays a role in the decision to mention it, and historian Krishnaji Chitnis states that for an argument from silence to apply, it must be of interest and significance to the person expected to be recording it, else it may be ignored; e.g. while later historians have lauded Magna Carta as a great national document, contemporary authors did not even record a word about its greatness; to them it was a feudal document of low significance, among several other seemingly similar items.

Classicist Timothy Barnes notes that the low level of interest in and awareness of Christians within the Roman Empire at the turn of the first century resulted in the lack of any discernible mention of them by Roman authors such as Martial and Juvenal, although Christians had been present in Rome since the reign of Claudius (41 to 54 AD) and both authors referred to Judaism. Theologian Peter Lampe states that during the first two centuries, the silence of Roman sources on Christians in Rome may be partly due to the fact that Christians often kept to themselves and did not reveal their identities.

=== Examples ===
==== Convincing applications ====
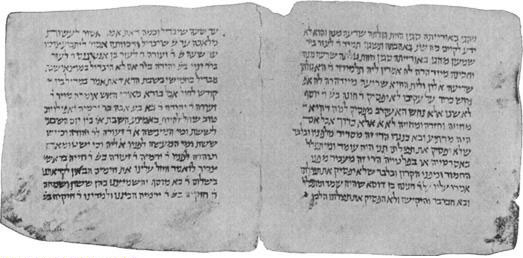
A page of a medieval Talmud

An example of a convincing application is that while the editors of the Jerusalem and Babylonian talmuds mention the other community, most scholars believe these documents were written independently; and Louis Jacobs writes, "If the editors of either had had access to an actual text of the other, it is inconceivable that they would not have mentioned this. Here the argument from silence is very convincing."

Sometimes the silence of multiple sources may have a probative value that sheds light on the historical circumstance, for instance Jacob Neusner states that an argument from silence regarding the absence of an Exilarch sheds light on the relationship between Jews and the Parthian administration in Babylonia.

An example of a convincing application is the silence of Cicero on works of oratory by Cato; the argument gaining its strength from the fact that Cato was such an important figure in Cicero's Brutus and he would have likely been cited if possible. Although Cicero's silence on Cato is a convincing argument from silence, the same strength does not apply to Cicero's silence on the quaestorship of Caelius, Michael Alexander stating that a number of factors may have precluded Cicero from mentioning it.

==== Failed applications ====
Yifa has pointed out the perils of arguments from silence, in that the lack of references to a compilation of a set of monastic codes by contemporaries or even by disciples does not mean that it never existed. This is well illustrated by the case of Changlu Zongze's "Rules of purity" which he wrote for the Chan monastery in 1103. One of his contemporaries wrote a preface to a collection of his writings neglecting to mention his code. And none of his biographies nor the documents of the Transmission of the Lamp, nor the Pure Land documents (which exalt him) refer to Zongze's collection of a monastic code. However a copy of the code in which the author identifies himself exists.

Historian Pierre Briant points out that the recent discovery of a customs memorandum from Egypt which dates to the time of Xerxes and records the registration and taxation of ships overrides previous reasonings about the type of commercial prosperity associated with Sidon based on the relative silence in texts about roads and is a reminder of the dangers of any argument from silence.

Frances Wood based her controversial book Did Marco Polo go to China? on arguments from silence. Wood argued that Marco Polo never went to China and fabricated his accounts because he failed to mention elements from the visual landscape such as tea, did not record the Great Wall and neglected to record practices such as foot-binding. She argued that no outsider could spend 15 years in China and not observe and record these elements. Most historians disagree with Wood's reasoning.

Professors of philosophy Sven Bernecker and Duncan Pritchard state that arguments from silence are generally weak and can go astray in many cases, and point to examples such as Marco Polo's neglect of the Wall of China, and Pliny the Younger's silence on the destruction of Pompeii and Herculaneum when he discusses the 79 AD eruption of Vesuvius in detail in his letters.

==== Use with caution ====
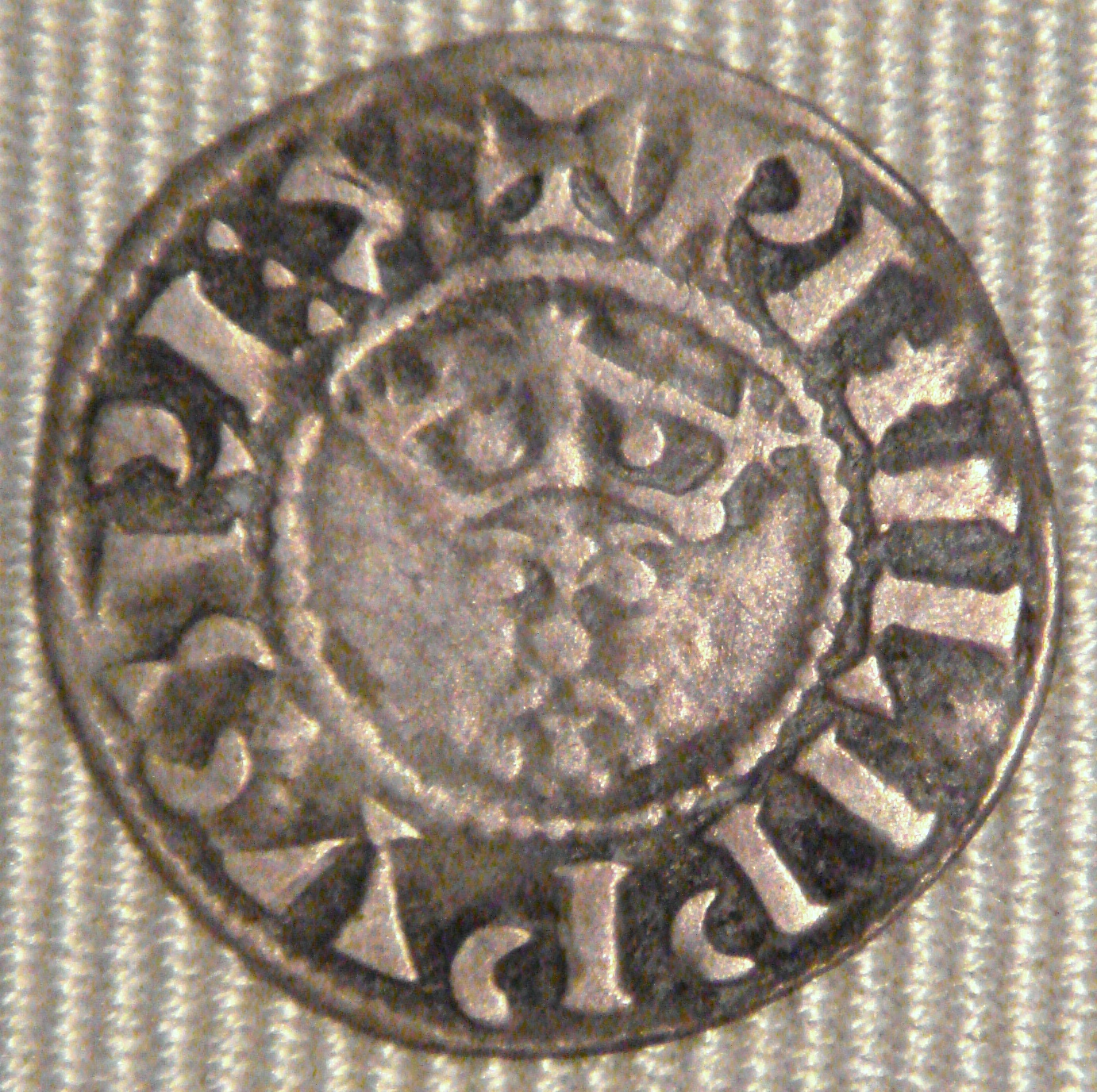
A denier from Bourges, 1180

Some historians note the general dangers of arguing from silence, but use them in specific cases as indications of levels of professional activity within medieval communities, e.g. historian John E. Law states that while arguing from silence is always dangerous, one may use it as an indication of the low level of local military employment in Camerino for the Da Varano in the Middle Ages. Similarly, historian Patricia Skinner states that after accounting for the dangers of arguments from silence they may provide an indication of the scarcity of females within the medical profession in medieval southern Italy. Historian James Amelang has pointed out that although the autobiographies of early medieval artisans are surprisingly silent on issues regarding their trade and craft, arguing from silence includes hazards in that historians may be assigning weight to past significance in view of modern emphasis.

Barrie J. Cook, the British Museum European coin curator, notes the risks of arguing from silence, yet states that they may shed light on the medieval propensity of the usage of the French denier from Le Mans versus the Angevine.

Greg Walker, professor of rhetoric and English, states that during the reign of Henry VIII, the lack of references to named plays by Nicholas Udall (e.g. the Respublica) do not necessarily support their not having been performed at court; given other evidence such as payment warrants issued to Udall for performance masks.

== Legal aspects ==
Jed Rubenfeld, professor of Law at Yale Law School, has shown an example of the difficulty in applying arguments from silence in constitutional law, stating that although arguments from silence can be used to draw conclusions about the intent of the Framers of the US Constitution, their application can lead to two different conclusions and hence they can not be used to settle the issues.

In the context of Morocco's Truth Commission of 1999 regarding torture and secret detentions, Wu and Livescu state that the fact that someone remained silent is no proof of their ignorance about a specific piece of information. They point out that the absence of records about the torture of prisoners under the secret detention program is no proof that such detentions did not involve torture, or that some detentions did not take place.

== See also ==
- Argument from ignorance
- Damnatio memoriae
- Evidence of absence
- Philosophic burden of proof
- Philosophic burden of proof § Proving a negative
- Right to silence in England and Wales § Adverse inferences from silence
