= Politics of translation =

Translation is political process, and the reception of translations involves the target language's cultural and political context. Translations transform the source text. The politics of translation is the subject of ongoing debate in the field of translation studies.
