= UNISIST model =

The UNISIST model of information dissemination was proposed in 1971 by the United Nations. UNISIST (United Nations International Scientific Information System) is a model of the social system of communication, which consists of knowledge producers, intermediaries, and users. These groups of people (or actors) are different kinds of professionals. The social system also contains institutes such as research institutes, publishers, and libraries. The actors and institutions perform information services such as writing, publishing, storing and retrieving documents and information. The actors are communicating in both formal and informal ways and they are producing different kinds of documents such as journal articles, books, book reviews, proceedings, bibliographies and catalogues, dictionaries, handbooks, encyclopedias and review articles.

The UNISIST model can be used to define relations between various kinds of scientific and scholarly documents and to compare various domains and their discursive practices. It provides a classification of documents and information services into primary, secondary and tertiary services and products.

The original UNISIST model has been updated. The two most important reasons for the updated version have been:

1. to emphasize differences between different knowledge domains and their structures of communication
2. to reflect the changes in scientific and scholarly communication facilitated by the Internet and information technologies

== See also ==
- Primary source
- Secondary source
- Tertiary source
- Source literature
