= Historical source =

Sources of history

A historical source encompasses "every kind of evidence that human beings have left of their past activities — the written word and spoken word, the shape of the landscape and the material artefact, the fine arts as well as photography and film."

While the range of potential historical sources has expanded to include many non-documentary sources, nevertheless "the study of history has nearly always been based squarely on what the historian can read in documents or hear from informants".

Historical sources are usually divided into primary and secondary, though some historians also refer to tertiary sources.

== Types ==
=== Primary source ===
In the study of history as an academic discipline, a "primary source" (also called an "original source") is a first hand account of events by someone who lived through them. "Primary sources were made during the historical period that is being investigated."

=== Secondary source ===
In scholarship, a secondary source is a document or recording that relates or discusses information originally presented elsewhere.

A secondary source is one that gives information about a primary source. In a secondary source, the original information is selected, modified and arranged in a suitable format. Secondary sources involve generalization, analysis, interpretation, or evaluation of the original information.

=== Tertiary source ===
A tertiary source is an index or textual consolidation of already published primary and secondary sources that does not provide additional interpretations or analysis of the sources. Some tertiary sources can be used as an aid to find key (seminal) sources, key terms, general common knowledge and established mainstream science on a topic. The exact definition of tertiary varies by academic field.

== See also ==
- Archive
