= Charles-Victor Langlois =

French historian and paleographer

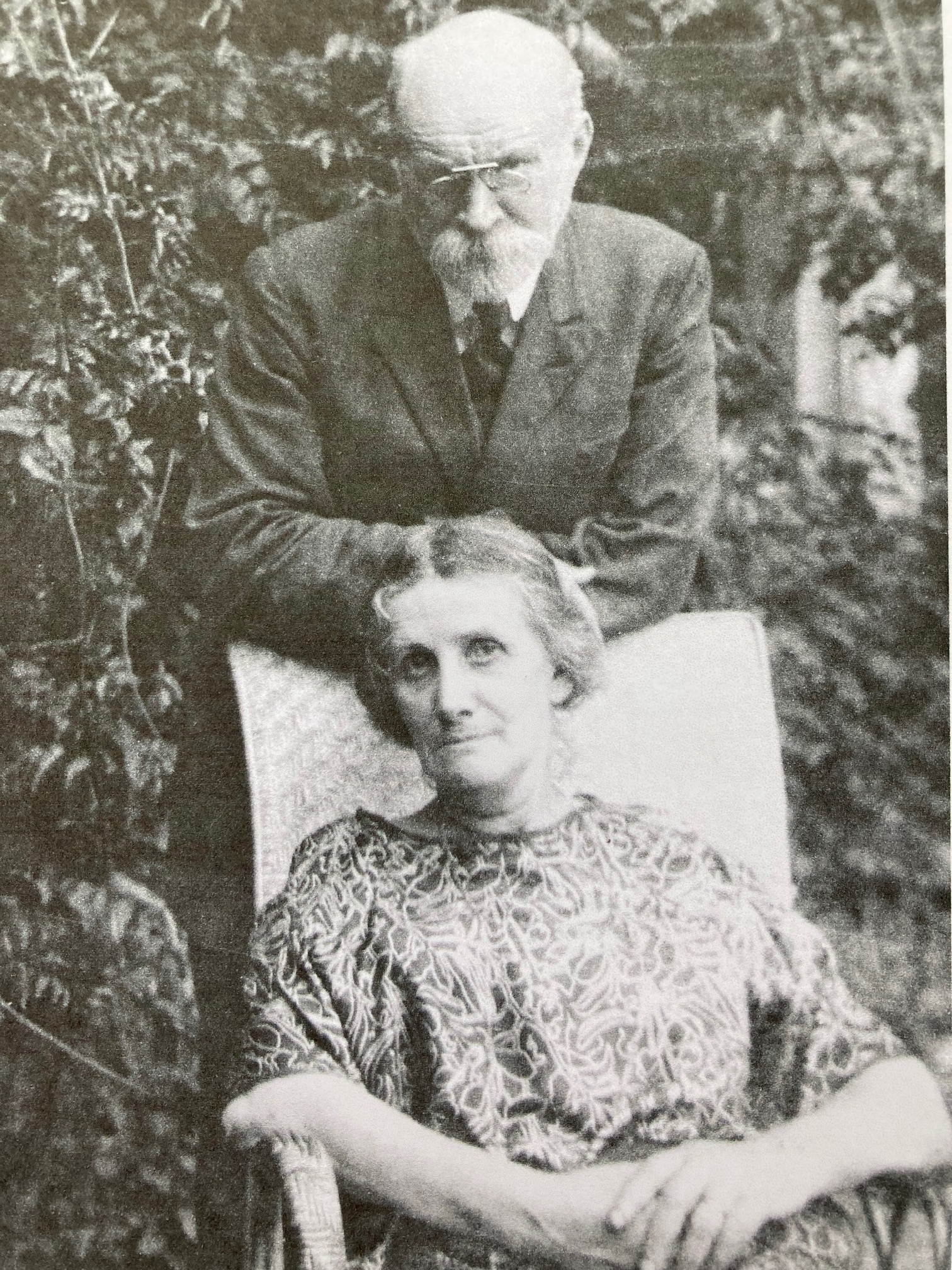
Charles-Victor Langlois

Charles-Victor Langlois (French: [ʃaʁl viktɔʁ lɑ̃ɡlwa]; May 26, 1863, Rouen – June 25, 1929, Paris) was a French historian, archivist and paleographer, who specialized in the study of the Middle Ages and was a lecturer at the Sorbonne, where he taught paleography, bibliography, and the history of the Middle Ages.

== Biography ==
Langlois attended the École Nationale des Chartes and earned a doctorate in history from the University of Paris in 1887. He taught at the University of Douai before moving to the University of Paris. He was director of the National Archives of France from 1913 to 1929. Langlois was a leader in the use of the historical method, which taught a scientific form of studying history. His "Manual of Historical Bibliography" was a fundamental manual on how bibliographic methods, which went along with his studies of the historical method.

== Works ==
=== Introduction aux études historiques ===
His 1898 work Introduction aux études historiques, written with Charles Seignobos, is considered one of the first comprehensive manuals discussing the use of scientific techniques in historical research. The "Introduction to the Study of History" takes a very detailed view at finding a way to make history as accurate of a study as the sciences. The basis of their method is the all history comes from facts retrieved from first hand documents. These facts are then viewed by the historian from many different perspectives, allowing for an unbiased approach at history. By using methods such as external and internal criticism, the historian is able to see both the reader's and author's perspective on a piece of history. In order to get a completely accurate history, these facts must be sorted into categories into groups to allow for easy research. To both of these men, the goal of history was to make it a learnable subject for anyone so that it may be passed down.

To emphasize the importance of primary sources, Seignobos and Langlois began their handbook with the now well-known maxim, "History is made with documents."

== Bibliography ==
- Le Règne de Philippe III le Hardi (1887) Text freely available in gallica.bnf.fr
- Les Archives de l’histoire de France, in collaboration with Henri Stein (1891)
- Introduction aux études historiques, in collaboration with Charles Seignobos (1897) Text freely available in Les Classiques des sciences sociales
- Manuel de bibliographie historique (1901, 1904) Text freely available in gallica.bnf.fr
- La Connaissance de la nature et du monde au Moyen Âge (1911) Text freely available in gallica.bnf.fr
- Saint-Louis, Philippe le Bel, les derniers Capétiens directs (1911) Text freely available in gallica.bnf.fr
- La Vie en France au Moyen Âge : de la fin du XIIe au milieu du XIVe siècle (1927)
