= Source literature =

Source literature is a category of literature defined as material produced specifically to provide researchers with information or for non-research purposes but used as information in research. It may be cited and used in academic writing, in which case it is referred to as literature on the subject. Source literature includes materials not classified as primary, secondary, or tertiary literature, such as facsimiles, music, and trade literature.

What constitutes "source literature" is relative. From the perspective of a bibliographic index, indexed publications may be considered source literature. For example, the Social Sciences Citation Index functions as a source index covering the journals being indexed. These journals constitute the source literature from the perspective of this index. However, from the perspective of the indexed papers, the bibliographical references contained in individual papers are also considered source literature.

In the humanities, the term "source literature" has a more specific meaning than "published sources". Many archives publish important sources for historians and other scholars as reliable editions of previously unpublished sources. Publishing such sources requires knowledge of text philology and related fields. The expertise involved in publishing source literature is distinguished from the expertise required to use the sources in, for example, historical research. A historian may or may not use such "source literature" and may, based on their research, publish a paper which, in the UNISIST model, is considered primary literature.

Thus, Søndergaard, Andersen and Hjørland (2003) suggest that source literature is a distinct type of literature that should be distinguished from primary literature.

== See also ==
- Sourcebook
- Primary source
- Secondary source
