= Charles Seignobos =

French historian

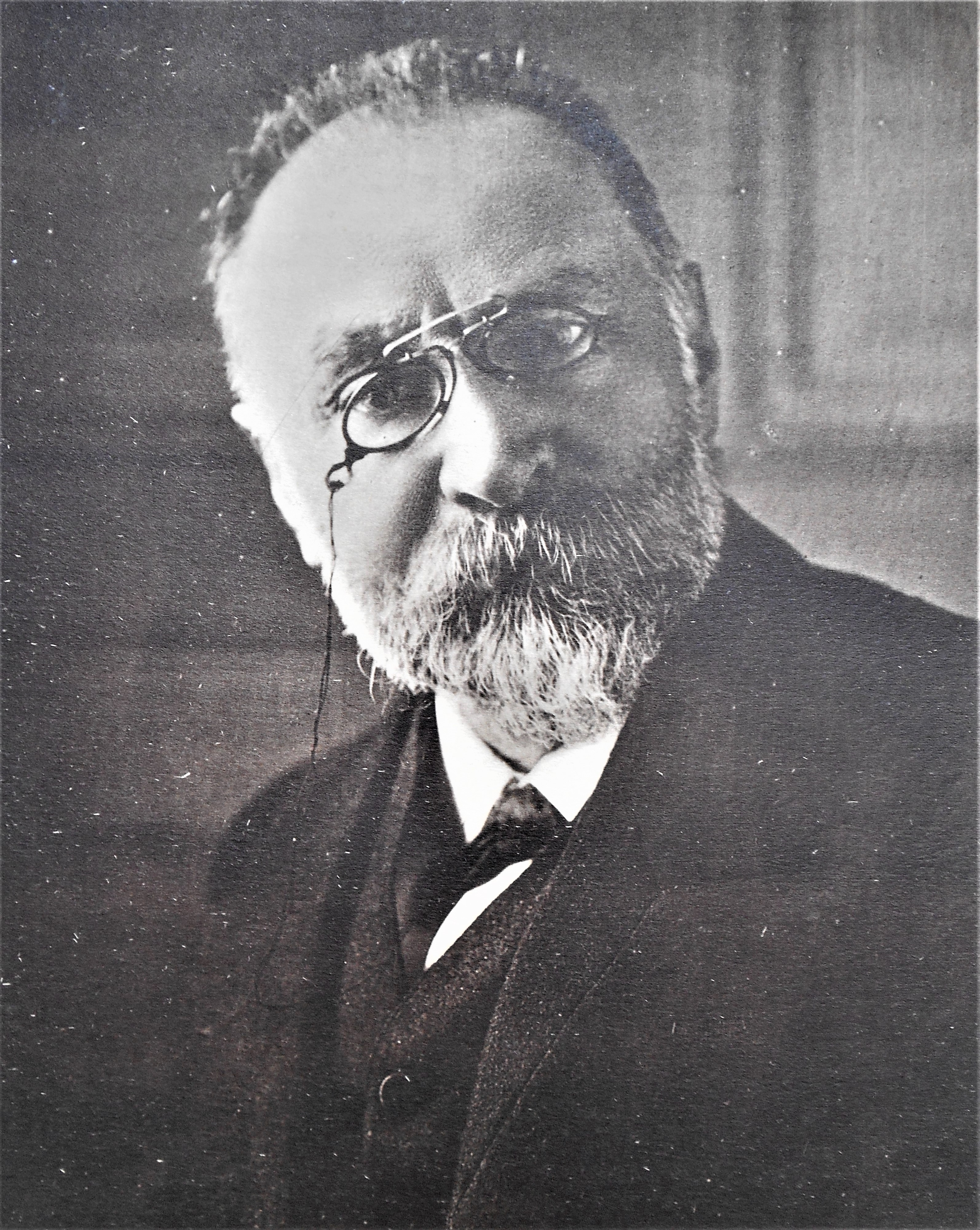
- Born: 10 September 1854; Lamastre, Ardèche
- Died: 24 April 1942 (aged 87); Ploubazlanec
- Occupation: Historian
- Writing career
- Subject: History
- Literary movement: Historical method

Charles Seignobos (10 September 1854 – 24 April 1942) was a French scholar of historiography and a historian who specialized in the history of the French Third Republic, and was a member of the Human Rights League.

== Personal life and education ==
Seignobos was born to a Republican Protestant family in 1854 at Lamastre in the Ardèche department of France, the son of Charles-André Seignobos, the deputy for Ardèche from 1871 to 1881 and again from 1890 to 1892 and also the Councillor of Lamastre from 1852 to 1892. He passed his baccalaureat in 1871 at Tournon, where he studied with the French Symbolist poet and critic Stéphane Mallarmé. After a stellar academic career at the École normale supérieure where he took courses with Numa Denis Fustel de Coulanges and Ernest Lavisse, he completed a degree in history.

Afterwards, he moved to Germany where he studied for two years, spending most of his time in Göttingen, Berlin, Munich, and Leipzig. Named to a tenured position as Maître de conférences at the University of Burgundy in 1879 and a professor at the École des hautes études internationales et politiques (HEI-HEP), he defended his doctoral thesis in 1881, and then was named to a position at the Sorbonne. He is regarded, along with his friend the physiologist Louis Lapicque, as one of the two founders of the scientific and humanistic community "Sorbonne-Plage" at L'Arcouest in Ploubazlanec, near Paimpol. (Marie Curie had a house constructed there and moved there in 1912).

His brother Raymond Seignobos succeeded their father (who had been a mayor for just a few weeks in 1870) as Mayor of Lamastre from 1895 to 1914.

Charles Seignobos died in April 1942 after having been placed under house arrest at Ploubazlanec in Brittany.

== Career ==
Considered along with Charles-Victor Langlois as one of the leading proponents of the historical method, Seignobos wrote a number of works on political history which implemented the German historical method, benefiting from his excellent knowledge of linguistic particulars in documentary research in English and German. He is, as a result of his critical reading of manuscripts, regarded as one of the major figures in the history of the historical method.

To emphasize the importance of primary sources, Seignobos and Langlois began their book "L'Introduction aux études historiques" (1898) with their famous maxim, "History is made with documents."
