= W. H. Marwick =

Scottish economic historian

William Hutton Marwick (16 October 1894 – 22 March 1982) was a Scottish economic historian, specialising in the labour movement.

Marwick's parents were Scottish missionaries for the United Presbyterian Church, and he was born near Calabar in Nigeria, then grew up in Jamaica. He then moved to Edinburgh and studied at George Watson's College and the University of Edinburgh. He was a conscientious objector during World War I, serving a prison term in Wormwood Scrubs, then joining the Home Office Work Scheme at Wakefield and in Wales, and from 1918 serving with the Friends' War Victims Relief.

In 1920, Marwick began working as a tutor and organiser for the Workers' Educational Association, and from 1924 to 1925, he was a principal lecturer at the International People's College in Denmark. He joined the Independent Labour Party, which sponsored him as a Labour Party candidate at the 1929 United Kingdom general election in Dumfriesshire, although he took only a distant third place.

From 1948, Marwick was a lecturer in economic history at the University of Edinburgh, and he served as President of the Scottish Labour History Society. He retired from his academic post in 1964, but continued to write.

Marwick's younger son Arthur became a prominent social historian.
