= Julie Ann Walker =

American author

Julie Ann Walker is a New York Times and USA Today Best Selling American author, known for her Black Knights Inc. and Deep Six romantic suspense series, and her In Moonlight and Memories contemporary love story. Prior to becoming a full-time author, Walker worked as a high school mathematics teacher.

== Career ==
Walker's first novel, Hell on Wheels, landed on the USA Today's Best-Selling Books list in September 2012. That same month, her second novel, In Rides Trouble, hit The New York Times Best Seller list. Most of Walker's novels have been ranked on The New York Times Best Seller list and USA Today's Best-Selling Books list, and they have been nominated for multiple awards, including the Book Buyer's Best Award, the National Readers Choice Award, the Bookseller's Best Award, the Australian Romance Reader Awards, and the Romance Writers of America's prestigious RITA award.

== Personal life ==
When Walker is not writing, she prefers to be reading, riding her bicycle, or traveling. She has been quoted as saying that she has only one item on her bucket list: to visit 100 countries before she dies. "I'm halfway there!"

== Series ==
=== Black Knights Inc. ===
Black Knights Inc. is a romantic suspense series set in Chicago. It follows twelve members of Black Knight Inc, a covert government defense firm that operates under the guise of a custom motorcycle shop. The tagline for the series is: "Motorcycle mechanics by day; Uncle Sam's last resort by night."

=== Deep Six ===
Deep Six is a romantic suspense and adventure series set on a fictional island in the Gulf of Mexico. It follows six "retired" Navy SEALs as they hunt for the lost treasure of the world's holy grail of sunken shipwrecks, the Santa Cristina. The series tagline is: Six men. One sunken Spanish galleon. Millions of gold and silver coins lying in wait on the ocean floor. And a past that refuses to let the guys of Deep Six Salvage forget the Navy SEAL motto that the only easy day was yesterday..."

=== In Moonlight and Memories ===
In Moonlight and Memories is a contemporary romance trilogy that follows three characters whose lives are, for good or bad, inexorably intertwined. It is an epic story about sacrifice, redemption, friendship, and the awe-inspiring power of love. According to the author, "Most love stories have one beginning and one ending. This love story has many."

== Bibliography ==
=== Black Knights Inc. ===
1. Hell on Wheels (2012, Sourcebooks, Inc.) [Ghost]
2. In Rides Trouble (2012, Sourcebooks) [Boss]
3. Rev It Up (2012, Sourcebooks) [Snake]
4. Thrill Ride (2013, Sourcebooks) [Rock]
5. Born Wild (2013, Sourcebooks) [Wild Bill]
6. Hell for Leather (2014, Sourcebooks) [Mac]
7. Full Throttle (2014, Sourcebooks) [Steady]
8. Too Hard to Handle (2015, Sourcebooks) [Dan the Man]
9. Wild Ride (April 2017) [Ozzie]
10. Fuel for Fire (July 2017) [Zoelner]
11. Hot Pursuit (October 2017) [Christian]
12. Built to Last (July 2018) [Angel]

=== Deep Six ===
1. Hell or High Water (2015, Sourcebooks)
2. Devil and the Deep (2016, Sourcebooks)
3. Ride the Tide (2020, Sourcebooks)
4. Deeper than the Ocean (2021, Limerence Publications LLC)
5. Shot Across the Bow (2021, Limerence Publications LLC)
6. Dead in the Water (2022, Limerence Publications LLC)
- Hot As Hell (2015, 0.5, prequel novella, Sourcebooks, originally published in Way of the Warrior charity anthology)

=== In Moonlight and Memories ===
1. In Moonlight and Memories: Volume One (July 2019)
2. In Moonlight and Memories: Volume Two (July 2019)
3. In Moonlight and Memories: Volume Three (July 2019)
