= Sourcebook =

Sourcebook, source books, etc, may refer to:

- Sourcebook (textbook), collection of writings on a subject that is intended to be a basic introduction to the topic presented
- Sourcebook (gaming), books of supplementary content for role-playing (or other) games
- Source Book, the name of a number of American encyclopedias published from the 1910s to 1936
- Sourcebooks, American independent book publisher located in Naperville, Illinois
- Sourcebook Project, a collection of writings by physicist William R. Corliss
- Source literature

== See also ==
- The Source (novel), a 1965 novel by James A. Michener
- Source (disambiguation)
