= Ernst Bernheim =

German historian (1850–1942)

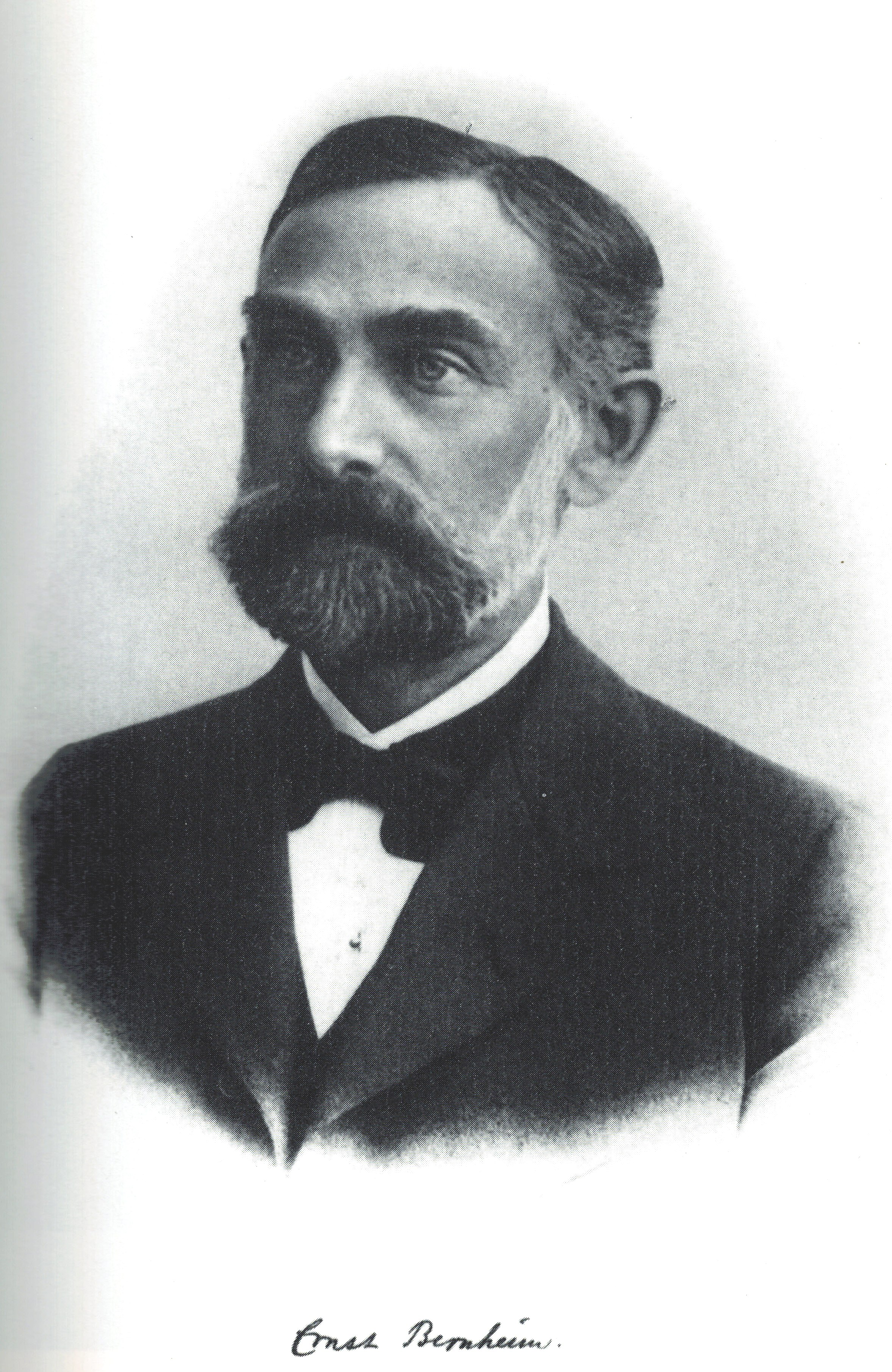
Ernst Bernheim

Ernst Bernheim (19 February 1850 – 9 July 1942) was a German historian who is best known for an influential Lehrbuch der historischen Methode (1889) on

== Early life ==
He was born in Hamburg as a son of merchant Louis Bernheim (later changed to Ludwig Bernheim, born 7 December 1815 in Fürstenberg) and Emma Simon (born 15 April 1834 in Kolberg) and from 1834 lived in Hamburg.

On 16 April 1884, he married Amalie ("Emma") Henriette Jessen (born 18 September 1861 in Hamburg, died 9 July 1945 in Greifswald). They had a daughter and three sons.

== Career ==
Ernst attended the Johanneum from Easter 1862 and graduated with the Abitur on 22 September 1868. From 1868 to 1872, he studied history in Berlin, Heidelberg, and Straßburg He graduated with the grades Dr. phil and Dr jur. in Straßburg (1873, supervised by Georg Waitz) and Dr habil in Göttingen (1874–75, supervised by Julius Weizsäcker). Thereafter, he taught history at the University of Göttingen and at the University of Bonn.

In 1883, he was called to the University of Greifswald, Institute for History, where he held the positions of an "außerordentlicher Professor" ("Privatdozent") since 1883, and "ordentlicher Professor" since 1889. In 1899, he was elected rector of the university. He was named professor emeritus in 1921.

== Nazi era ==
His Jewish descent made Bernheim subject to repressions during the Nazi era. In 1933, he was forbidden to lecture, and an appeal to Adolf Hitler to regain that permission was not successful. On 4 December 1935, with the implementation of the Nuremberg Laws, Bernheim lost German citizenship. An appeal to Hitler to regain citizenship, which was backed by a number of scientists from the University of Greifswald was successful, and Bernheim was assigned "temporary citizenship" on 12 January 1938 and let him avoid deportation in 1940. Yet, just weeks before his death, the deaf-mute foster child of the family, Hetti Meyer, was deported to Theresienstadt and killed. Hetti was raised from her birth by Bernheim and his wife Emma, a special education teacher. From 1939 onwards, Nazi scientists systematically besmirched Bernheim's scientific work, which was not appreciated again until postwar Germany.

Bernheim died on 3 March 1942 in Greifswald. His former colleagues managed to circumvent Nazi orders and to get his urn buried in the town's graveyard on 23 July 1943, but an obituary was not permitted.

== Legacy ==
A memorial plaque was attached to his Greifswald house, at 26 Arndtstraße. Furthermore, a street in Greifswald was named after him.
