= Clive Emsley =

British historian and criminologist (1944–2020)

Clive Emsley (4 August 1944 – 5 October 2020) was a British historian and criminologist. He was a research director and lecturer at the Open University.

== Biography ==
After his first degree at the University of York, where he was one of the initial intake of 150 undergraduates, he did research at Peterhouse, Cambridge, into the maintenance of public order in England during the French Revolution. At this point he had to make a career decision, having been a prominent member of the National Youth Theatre as an actor during his time at university. He played the part of Enobarbus (cf Rob Wilton's Theatricalia programme) in a celebrated production of 'Anthony and Cleopatra', with Helen Mirren as Cleopatra, and as a result was offered professional roles. However, he decided to stay in academia and refused the chance to become an actor though he kept his association with the National Youth Theatre during summer stints as an associate director, including 'Julius Caesar' which played in Germany in 1968.

He joined the Open University in 1970 as a lecturer, but was later a visiting fellow at Griffith University, Brisbane, Australia, where he advised on distance teaching (1983) and co-authored a teaching module (1996) which now forms part of a taught MA both at Griffith and the Open University.

He was visiting professor at the University of Paris VIII (Vincennes-St.Denis) (1983–1984) and at the University of Calgary, Alberta, Canada (1988 and 1990). He was elected president of the International Association for the History of Crime and Criminal Justice in 1995 and continued in the post. From October to November 2003 he was visiting professor at the University of Canterbury, Christchurch, New Zealand, and from September to December 2004, visiting research fellow at the Humanities Research Centre at the Australian University, Canberra.

He maintained a research interest in the revolutionary and Napoleonic era, but from the early 1980s onwards, his work focused primarily on the history of crime and policing. He co-directed the Old Bailey Proceedings Online project.

In 2000 he was awarded a D.Litt. by the Open University for his published work in the history of crime and policing. He was director of the European Centre for the Study of Policing, and co-director of the International Centre for Comparative Criminological Research.

== Bibliography ==
- Emsley, Clive, ed. (1979). Conflict and stability in Europe. London: Croom Helm for the Open University.
- Emsley, C. (2017)Theories and Origins of the Modern Police(First Edition). Routledge
- — (1979). British society and the French Wars, 1793–1815. London: Macmillan.
- Crime and Society in England, 1750–1900, 1987, 1996, 2004
- The English Police: A Political and Social History, 1991, 1996
- Gendarmes and the State in Nineteenth-century Europe, 1999
- Britain and the French Revolution, 2000
- Napoleon: Conquest, Reform and Reorganisation, 2003
- Hard Men: Violence in England since 1750, 2005
- Crime, Police and Penal Policy: European Experiences, 1750–1940, 2007
- The Great British Bobby: A history of British policing from 1829 to the present, 2009
- Soldier, Sailor, Beggarman, Thief, 2013
- Exporting British Policing During the Second world War, 2017
- — (November 2013). "The Battle of Brisbane: a Thanksgiving like no other". History Matters. History Today. 63 (11): 3–4.

=== Book reviews ===
Date	Review article	Work(s) reviewed
2013	"[Untitled review]". Reviews. History Today. 63 (11): 59. November 2013.	Panayi, Panikos. Prisoners of Britain: German civilian and combatant internees during the First World War. Manchester University Press.
