= Tertiary source =

Index or textual consolidation of primary and secondary sources

A tertiary source is an index or textual consolidation of already published primary and secondary sources that does not provide additional interpretations or analysis of the sources. Some tertiary sources can be used as an aid to find key (seminal) sources, key terms, general common knowledge and established mainstream science on a topic. The exact definition of tertiary varies by academic field.

Academic research standards generally do not accept tertiary sources such as encyclopedias as citations, although survey articles are frequently cited rather than the original publication.

== Overlap with secondary sources ==
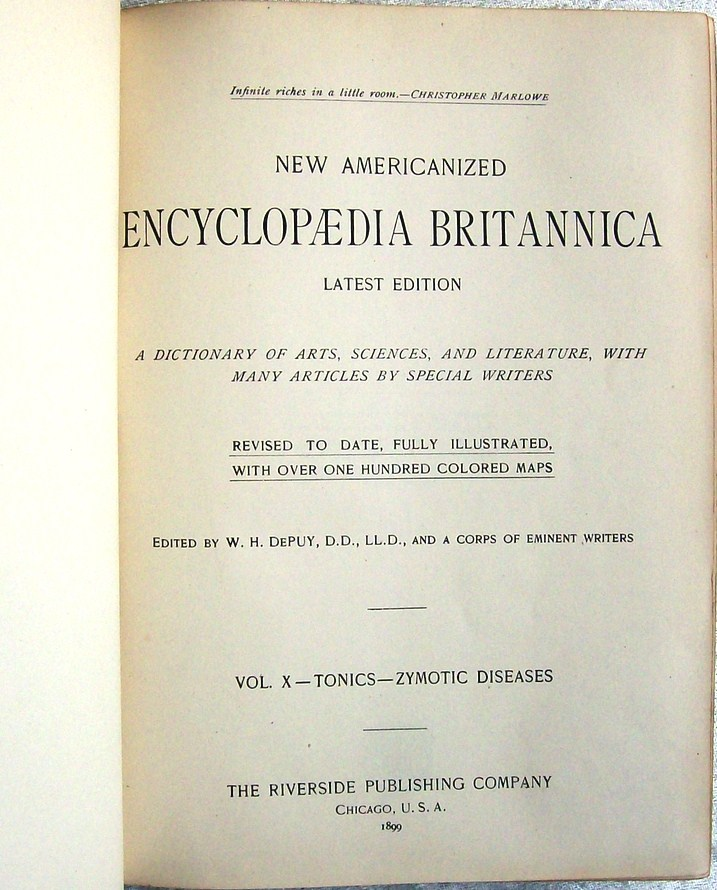
The inside cover of an encyclopedia, which is an example of a tertiary source.

As is also the case with distinguishing primary and secondary sources in some disciplines, there is not always a clear distinguishing line between secondary and tertiary sources. Depending on the topic of research, a scholar may use a bibliography, dictionary, or encyclopedia as either a tertiary or a secondary source. This causes some difficulty in defining many sources as either one type or the other.

In some academic disciplines, the differentiation between a secondary and tertiary source is relative.

In the United Nations International Scientific Information System (UNISIST) model, a secondary source is a bibliography, whereas a tertiary source is a synthesis of primary sources.

== Types of tertiary sources ==
Tertiary sources can come in book form or as an online resource. Tertiary sources in book form are frequently organized in alphabetical order, whereas an online tertiary source may be searchable by keyword.

Examples of tertiary sources include: reference books, encyclopedias, dictionaries, some textbooks, abstracts, directories, factbooks, handbooks, manuals and compendia. Indexes, bibliographies, concordances, and databases are aggregates of primary and secondary sources and therefore often considered tertiary sources. They may also serve as a point of access to the full or partial text of primary and secondary sources. Almanacs, travel guides, field guides, and timelines are also examples of tertiary sources.

Tertiary sources attempt to summarize, collect, and consolidate the source materials into an overview without adding analysis and synthesis of new conclusions.

== Using tertiary sources ==
Tertiary sources, unlike primary and secondary sources, aren't usually cited because they don't contain any original analysis. Despite this, they are often used to get an overall understanding of a topic and to find other primary and secondary sources to cite.

== See also ==
- Source text
- Third-party source
