= Martha C. Howell =

American historian

- Awards: Guggenheim Fellowship (2002)

Academic background
- Education: Georgetown University (BA, PhD); Columbia University (BPhil)

Academic work
- Discipline: Medieval history
- Institutions: Rutgers University; Columbia University

Martha C. Howell is an American historian. She is Miriam Champion Emerita Professor of History at Columbia University.

== Biography ==
Howell received her B.A. from Georgetown University, and both her M.A. and PhD. from Columbia University. She taught at Rutgers University before joining the Columbia University faculty in 1989, serving as Director of the university's Institute for Research on Women and Gender from 1989 to 1995. Her specialization is the socioeconomic and women's history in Northern Europe during the late Medieval and Early modern centuries, focusing on the Netherlands, northern France, and Germany.

She received a Guggenheim Fellowship in 2002 in the field of Medieval history. She received an honorary doctorate from Ghent University and was elected a member of the Royal Flemish Academy of Belgium for Science and the Arts.
