= Source text =

Text from which information is derived

A source text is a text from which information or ideas are derived. In translation, a source text is the original text that is to be translated into another language.

More generally, source material or symbolic sources are objects meant to communicate information, either publicly or privately, to some person, known or unknown. Typical symbolic sources include written documents such as letters, notes, receipts, ledgers, manuscripts, reports, or public signage, etc. It also includes oral sources, based on speech instead of writing, as well as graphic art. Symbolic sources exclude, for example, bits of broken pottery or scraps of food excavated from a midden—and this regardless of how much information can be extracted from an ancient trash heap, or how little can be extracted from a written document.

== Classification in levels ==
In historiography, distinctions are commonly made between three levels of source texts: primary, secondary, and tertiary.

=== Primary ===
Primary sources are firsthand written accounts made at the time of an event by someone who was present. They have been described as those sources closest to the origin of the information or idea under study. These types of sources have been said to provide researchers with "direct, unmediated information about the object of study." Primary sources are sources which, usually, are recorded by someone who participated in, witnessed, or lived through the event. These are also usually authoritative and fundamental documents concerning the subject under consideration. This includes published original accounts, published original works, or published original research. They may contain original research or new information not previously published elsewhere. They have been distinguished from secondary sources, which often cite, comment on, or build upon primary sources. They serve as an original source of information or new ideas about the topic. Primary and secondary, however, are relative terms, and any given source may be classified as primary or secondary, depending on how it is used. Physical objects can be primary sources.

=== Secondary and tertiary ===
Secondary sources are written accounts of history based upon the evidence from primary sources. These are sources which, usually, are accounts, works, or research that analyze, assimilate, evaluate, interpret, and/or synthesize primary sources. These are not as authoritative and are supplemental documents concerning the subject under consideration. These documents or people summarize other material, usually primary source material. They are academics, journalists, and other researchers, and the papers and books they produce. This includes published accounts, published works, or published research. For example, a history book drawing upon diary and newspaper records.

Tertiary sources are compilations based upon primary and secondary sources. These are sources which, on average, do not fall into the above two levels. They consist of generalized research of a specific subject under consideration. Tertiary sources are analyzed, assimilated, evaluated, interpreted, and/or synthesized from secondary sources, also. These are not authoritative and are just supplemental documents concerning the subject under consideration. These are often meant to present known information in a convenient form with no claim to originality. Common examples are encyclopedias and textbooks.

The distinction between primary source and secondary source is standard in historiography, while the distinction between these sources and tertiary sources is more peripheral, and is more relevant to the scholarly research work than to the published content itself.

Below are types of sources that most generally, but not absolutely, fall into a certain level. The letters after an item describes generally the type it is (though this can vary pending the exact source). P is for primary sources, S is for secondary sources, and T is for tertiary sources; those with ?s are indeterminate.

- Published Documents(?)
  - Maps(?)
  - Literature(?)
    - Autobiographies (P)
    - Biographies (S)
    - Poems(?)
    - Books(?)
    - Magazines (T)
    - Newspaper articles (S)
    - Pamphlets (T)
    - Posters (P)
  - Advertisements (P)
  - Research (P)
    - Peer journals (S)
- Non-government documents(?)
  - Organization papers (P)
- Government documents (P)
  - Public records (P)
  - Voter lists (?)
  - Police records (?)
  - Court records (?)
  - Court hearings (?)
  - Court proceedings (?)
  - Tax accounts(?)
  - Census data and records (P)
  - Classified documents (P)
  - Laws (P)
  - Treaties (P)
  - Court decisions (P)
- Unpublished documents(?)
  - Personal papers (P)
    - Letters (P)
    - Diaries (P)
    - Journals (P)
    - Wills (P)
  - Research(?)
    - Surveys(?)
    - Fieldwork(?)
  - Reports(?)
  - Speeches(P)
  - Interviews(?)
  - Membership records(?)
  - Meeting transcripts(?)
  - Financial accounts(?)

== Authoritative sources ==
A source that is official is called authoritative if it is known to be reliable and its authority or authenticity is widely recognized by experts in the field. Libraries specialize in collecting these types of resources so that students and faculty have the tools they need to research effectively.

== In translation ==
In translation, a source text (ST) is a text written in a given source language which is to be or has been, translated into another language. According to Jeremy Munday's definition of translation, "the process of translation between two different written languages involves the changing of an original written text (the source text or ST) in the original verbal language (the source language or SL) into a written text (the target text or TT) in a different verbal language (the target language or TL)". The terms 'source text' and 'target text' are preferred over 'original' and 'translation' because they do not have the same positive vs. negative value judgment.

Translation scholars including Eugene Nida and Peter Newmark have represented the different approaches to translation as falling broadly into source-text-oriented or target-text-oriented categories.

== See also ==
- Journalism sourcing
- Source (disambiguation)
- Source literature
- Text (disambiguation)
- Wikisource
