= Primary source =

First-hand account of information

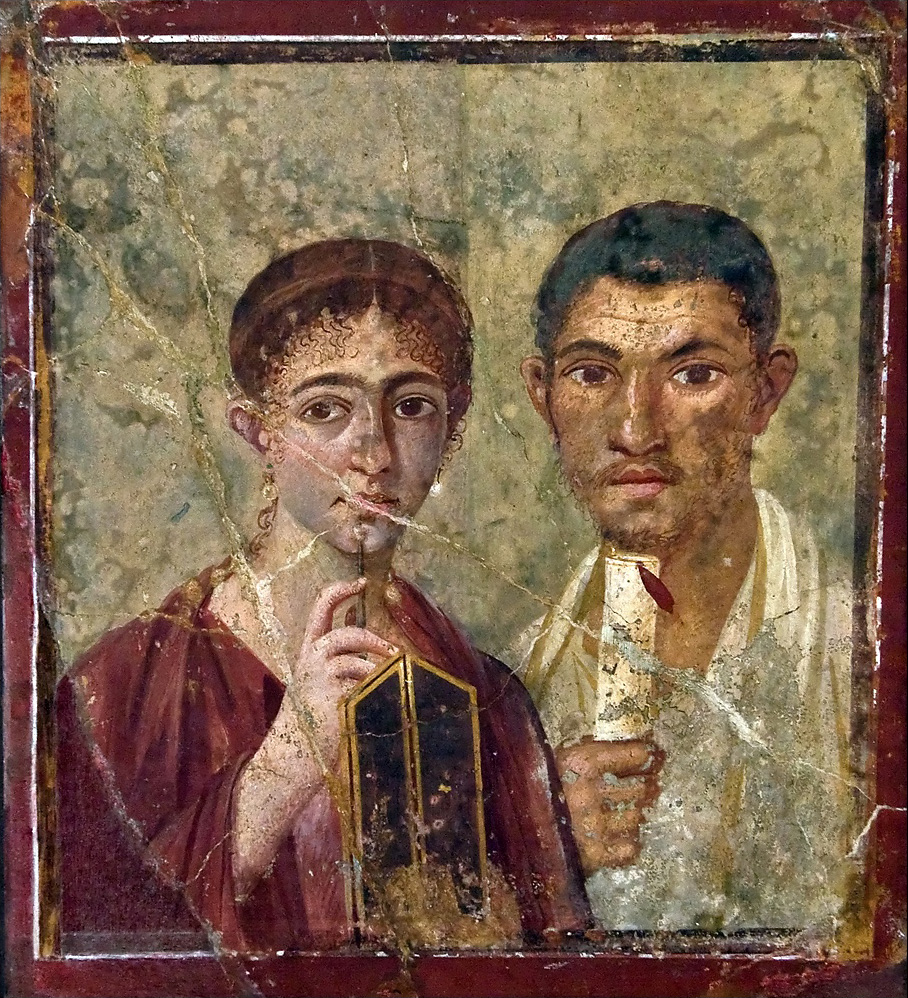
This wall painting found in the Roman city of Pompeii is an example of a primary source about people in Pompeii in Roman times (portrait of Terentius Neo).

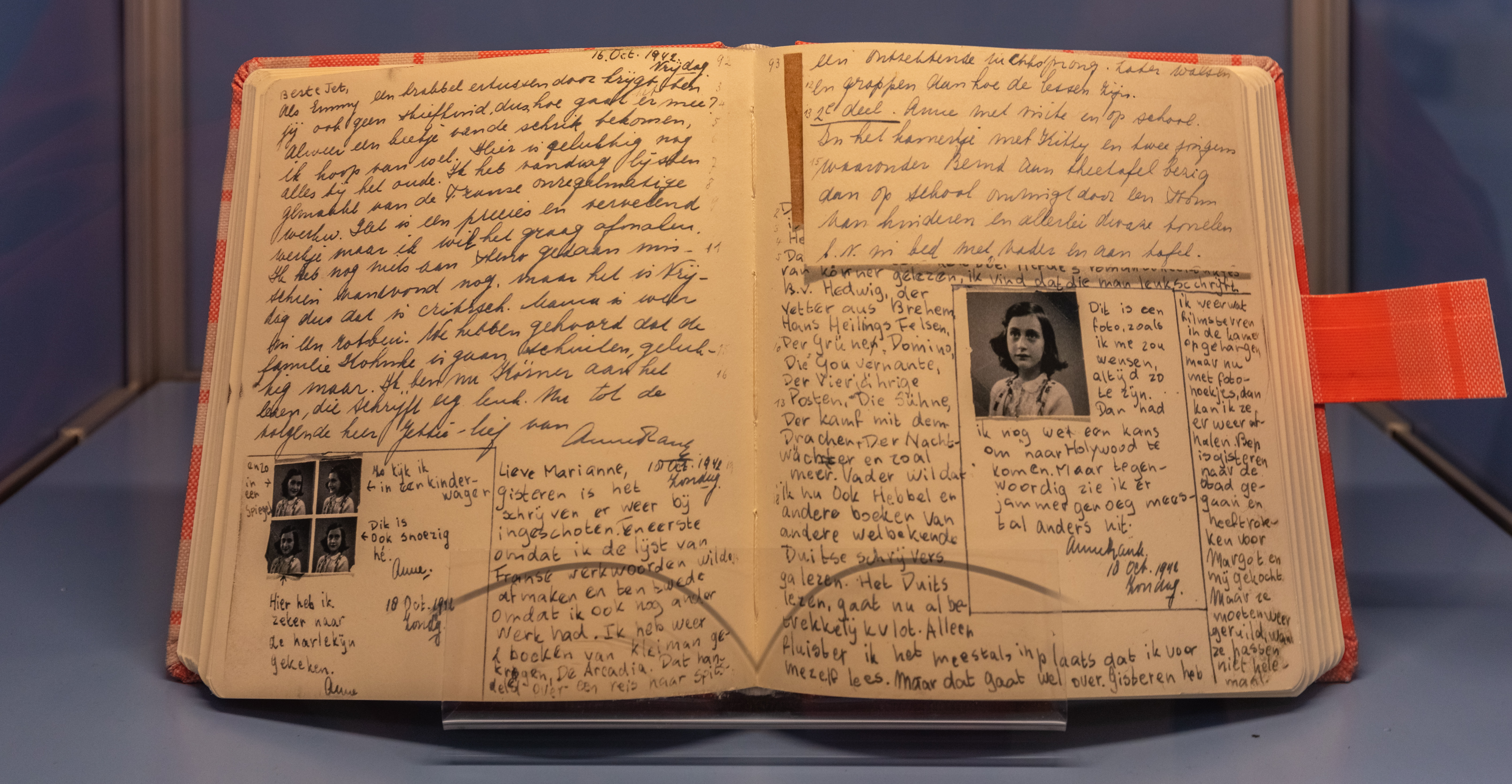
The diary of Anne Frank is an example of a written primary source, particularly for study on World War II.

In the study of history as an academic discipline, a primary source (also called an original source) is an artifact, document, diary, manuscript, autobiography, recording, or any other source of information that was created at the time under study. It serves as an original source of information about the topic. Similar definitions can be used in library science and other areas of scholarship, although different fields have somewhat different definitions. In journalism, a primary source can be a person with direct knowledge of a situation, or a document written by such a person.

Primary sources are distinguished from secondary sources, which interpret, analyze, or otherwise comment on primary sources. Generally, accounts written after the fact with the benefit of hindsight are secondary. A secondary source may also be a primary source depending on how it is used. For example, a memoir is a primary source when it is used to study its author's life or personal relationships, but the same text becomes a secondary source if it is used to investigate broader cultural or social conditions. Thus, the categories “primary” and “secondary” are relative and depend on the historical context and the purpose of the study. "Primary" and "secondary" should be understood as relative terms, with sources categorized according to specific historical contexts and what is being studied.

== Classifying sources ==
Many sources can be considered either primary or secondary, depending on the context in which they are examined. Moreover, the distinction between primary and secondary sources is subjective and contextual, so that precise definitions are difficult to make. A book review, when it contains the opinion of the reviewer about the book rather than a summary of the book, becomes a primary source.

If a historical text discusses old documents to derive a new historical conclusion, it is considered to be a primary source for the new conclusion. Examples in which a source can be both primary and secondary include an obituary or a survey of several volumes of a journal counting the frequency of articles on a certain topic.

Whether a source is regarded as primary or secondary in a given context may change, depending upon the present state of knowledge within the field. For example, if a document refers to the contents of a previous but undiscovered letter, that document may be considered "primary", since it is the closest known thing to an original source; but if the letter is later found, it may then be considered "secondary".

In some instances, the reason for identifying a text as the "primary source" may devolve from the fact that no copy of the original source material exists, or that it is the oldest extant source for the information cited.

== Significance of source classification ==
=== History ===
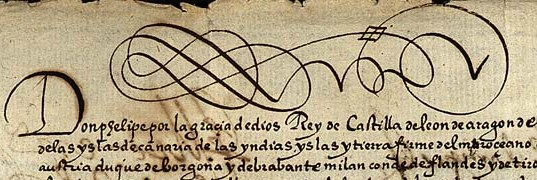
From a letter of Philip II, King of Spain, 16th century

In scholarly writing, an important objective of classifying sources is to determine their independence and reliability. In contexts such as historical writing, it is almost always advisable to use primary sources and that "if none are available, it is only with great caution that the author may proceed to make use of secondary sources." Sreedharan believes that primary sources have the most direct connection to the past and that they "speak for themselves" in ways that cannot be captured through the filter of secondary sources.

=== Other fields ===
Though the terms primary source and secondary source have often been used when discussing ideas and matters related to historiography, it can also be applied to many other fields. For example, these ideas may be used to trace the history of scientific theories, literary elements, and other information that is passed from one author to another.

In scientific literature, a primary source, or the "primary literature", is the original publication of a scientist's new data, results, and theories. In political history, primary sources are documents such as official reports, speeches, pamphlets, posters, or letters by participants, official election returns, and eyewitness accounts. In the history of ideas or intellectual history, the main primary sources are books, essays, and letters written by intellectuals; these intellectuals may include historians whose books and essays are therefore considered primary sources for the intellectual historian, though they are secondary sources in their own topical fields. In religious history, the primary sources are religious texts and descriptions of religious ceremonies and rituals.

A study of cultural history could include fictional sources such as novels or plays. In a broader sense primary sources also include artifacts like photographs, newsreels, coins, paintings or buildings created at the time. Historians may also take oral reports and interviews into consideration. Written sources may be divided into three types:

- Narrative sources or literary sources tell a story or message. They are not limited to fictional sources (which can be sources of information for contemporary attitudes) but include diaries, films, biographies, leading philosophical works, and scientific works.
- Diplomatic sources include charters and other legal documents which usually follow a set format.
- Social documents are records created by organizations, such as registers of births and tax records.

In historiography, when the study of history is subject to historical scrutiny, a secondary source becomes a primary source. For a biography of a historian, that historian's publications would be primary sources. Documentary films can be considered a secondary source or primary source, depending on how much the filmmaker modifies the original sources.

The Lafayette College Library provides a synopsis of primary sources in several areas of study:

The definition of a primary source varies depending upon the academic discipline and the context in which it is used.

- In the humanities, a primary source could be defined as something that was created either during the time period being studied or afterward by individuals reflecting on their involvement in the events of that time.
- In the social sciences, the definition of a primary source would be expanded to include numerical data that has been gathered to analyze relationships between people, events, and their environment.
- In the natural sciences, a primary source could be defined as a report of original findings or ideas. These sources often appear in the form of research articles with sections on methods and results.

== Finding primary sources ==
Although many primary sources remain in private hands, others are located in archives, libraries, museums, historical societies, and special collections. These can be public or private. Some are affiliated with universities and colleges, while others are government entities. Materials relating to one area might be located in many different institutions. These can be distant from the original source of the document. For example, the Huntington Library in California houses many documents from the United Kingdom. In some cases, primary sources are gathered together for publication, a process known as documentary editing.

In the US, digital copies of primary sources can be retrieved from a number of places. The Library of Congress maintains several digital collections where they can be retrieved. Some examples are American Memory and Chronicling America. The National Archives and Records Administration also has digital collections in Digital Vaults. The Digital Public Library of America searches across the digitized primary source collections of many libraries, archives, and museums. The Internet Archive also has primary source materials in many formats.

In the UK, the National Archives provides a consolidated search of its own catalog and a wide variety of other archives listed on the Access to Archives index. Digital copies of various classes of documents at the National Archives (including wills) are available from DocumentsOnline. Most of the available documents relate to England and Wales. Some digital copies of primary sources are available from the National Archives of Scotland. Many County Record Offices collections are included in Access to Archives, while others have their own online catalogs. Many County Record Offices will supply digital copies of documents.

In other regions, Europeana has digitized materials from across Europe while the World Digital Library and Flickr Commons have items from all over the world. Trove has primary sources from Australia.

Most primary source materials are not digitized and may only be represented online with a record or finding aid. Both digitized and not digitized materials can be found through catalogs such as WorldCat, the Library of Congress catalog, the National Archives catalog, and so on.

== Using primary sources ==
History as an academic discipline is based on primary sources, as evaluated by the community of scholars, who report their findings in books, articles, and papers. Arthur Marwick says "Primary sources are absolutely fundamental to history." Ideally, a historian will use all available primary sources that were created by the people involved at the time being studied. In practice, some sources have been destroyed, while others are not available for research. Perhaps the only eyewitness reports of an event may be memoirs, autobiographies, or oral interviews that were taken years later. Sometimes the only evidence relating to an event or person in the distant past was written or copied decades or centuries later. Manuscripts that are sources for classical texts can be copies of documents or fragments of copies of documents. This is a common problem in classical studies, where sometimes only a summary of a book or letter has survived. Potential difficulties with primary sources have the result that history is usually taught in schools using secondary sources.

Historians studying the modern period with the intention of publishing an academic article prefer to go back to available primary sources and to seek new (in other words, forgotten or lost) ones. Primary sources, whether accurate or not, offer new input into historical questions and most modern history revolves around heavy use of archives and special collections for the purpose of finding useful primary sources. A work on history is not likely to be taken seriously as a scholarship if it only cites secondary sources, as it does not indicate that original research has been done.

However, primary sources – particularly those from before the 20th century – may have hidden challenges. "Primary sources, in fact, are usually fragmentary, ambiguous, and very difficult to analyze and interpret." Obsolete meanings of familiar words and social context are among the traps that await the newcomer to historical studies. For this reason, the interpretation of primary texts is typically taught as part of an advanced college or postgraduate history course, although advanced self-study or informal training is also possible.

== Strengths and weaknesses ==
In many fields and contexts, such as historical writing, it is almost always advisable to use primary sources if possible, and "if none are available, it is only with great caution that [the author] may proceed to make use of secondary sources." In addition, primary sources avoid the problem inherent in secondary sources in which each new author may distort and put a new spin on the findings of prior cited authors.

A history, whose author draws conclusions from other than primary sources or secondary sources actually based on primary sources, is by definition fiction and not history at all.

— Kameron Searle

However, a primary source is not necessarily more of an authority or better than a secondary source. There can be bias and tacit unconscious views that twist historical information.

Original material may be... prejudiced, or at least not exactly what it claims to be.

— David Iredale

The errors may be corrected in secondary sources, which are often subjected to peer review, can be well documented, and are often written by historians working in institutions where methodological accuracy is important to the future of the author's career and reputation. Historians consider the accuracy and objectivity of the primary sources that they are using and historians subject both primary and secondary sources to a high level of scrutiny. A primary source such as a journal entry (or the online version, a blog), at best, may only reflect one individual's opinion on events, which may or may not be truthful, accurate, or complete.

Participants and eyewitnesses may misunderstand events or distort their reports, deliberately or not, to enhance their own image or importance. Such effects can increase over time, as people create a narrative that may not be accurate. For any source, primary or secondary, it is important for the researcher to evaluate the amount and direction of bias. As an example, a government report may be an accurate and unbiased description of events, but it may be censored or altered for propaganda or cover-up purposes. The facts can be distorted to present the opposing sides in a negative light. Barristers are taught that evidence in a court case may be truthful but may still be distorted to support or oppose the position of one of the parties.

== Forgeries ==
Historians must occasionally contend with forged documents that purport to be primary sources. These forgeries have usually been constructed with a fraudulent purpose, such as promulgating legal rights, supporting false pedigrees, or promoting particular interpretations of historic events. The investigation of documents to determine their authenticity is called diplomatics.

For centuries, popes used the forged Donation of Constantine to bolster the Papacy's secular power. Among the earliest forgeries are false Anglo-Saxon charters, a number of 11th- and 12th-century forgeries produced by monasteries and abbeys to support a claim to land where the original document had been lost or never existed. One particularly unusual forgery of a primary source was perpetrated by Sir Edward Dering, who placed false monumental brasses in a parish church. In 1986, Hugh Trevor-Roper authenticated the Hitler Diaries, which were later proved to be forgeries. In 2008. UK National Archives revealed that a historical revisionist had submitted forged documents for archiving, in the hope of establishing a false provenance. However, historians dealing with recent centuries rarely encounter forgeries of any importance.

== See also ==
Examples

- Monograph

Others

- Archival research
- Historiography
- Source criticism
- Source literature
- Source text
- Historical source
- Secondary source
- Tertiary source
- Original research
- UNISIST model
- Scientific journalism
- Scholarly method

== Bibliography ==
- Benjamin, Jules R. (2004). A Student's Guide to History. Boston: Bedford/St. Martin's. ISBN 0-312-40356-9.
- Craver, Kathleen W. (1999). Using Internet Primary Sources to Teach Critical Thinking Skills in History. Westwood, CT: Greenwood Press. ISBN 0-313-30749-0.
- Gray, Wood (1991) [1964]. Historian's Handbook: A Key to the Study and Writing of History (2nd ed.). Waveland Press. ISBN 978-0-88133-626-9.
- Marius, Richard; Page, Melvin Eugene (2005). A short guide to writing about history. New York: Pearson Longman. ISBN 978-0-321-22716-4.
- Olden-Jørgensen, Sebastian (2005). Til kilderne!: introduktion til historisk kildekritik [To the Sources: Introduction to Historical Source Criticism] (in Danish). København: Gads Forlag. ISBN 978-87-12-03778-1.
