= Outline of the Middle Ages =

Overview of and topical guide to the Middle Ages

The following outline is provided as an overview of and topical guide to the Middle Ages:

Middle Ages – periodization of European history from the 5th century to the 15th century. The Middle Ages follows the fall of the Western Roman Empire in 476 and precedes the early modern era. It is the middle period of a three-period division of Western history: classic, medieval and modern.

== Essence of the Middle Ages ==
Middle Ages

- Timeline of the Middle Ages

== Subdivisions of the Middle Ages ==
=== Periodization ===
- Early Middle Ages
- High Middle Ages
- Late Middle Ages
  - Crisis of the Late Middle Ages

=== Medieval history by region ===
- Albania in the Middle Ages
- History of Bosnia and Herzegovina (958–1463)
  - Visoko during the Middle Ages
- Britain in the Middle Ages
  - Invasions of the British Isles
  - Medieval religion in England
- Bulgarian Empire
  - First Bulgarian Empire
  - Second Bulgarian Empire
- Byzantine Empire
- Medieval Croatian state
- Cyprus in the Middle Ages
- Egypt in the Middle Ages
- History of the Czech lands in the Middle Ages
- France in the Middle Ages
- Germany in the Middle Ages
- Holy Roman Empire
- Kingdom of Hungary in the Middle Ages
- Italy in the Middle Ages
- Poland in the Middle Ages
- Romania in the Middle Ages
- Scotland in the Middle Ages
  - Scotland in the Early Middle Ages
  - Scotland in the High Middle Ages
    - Culture of Scotland in the High Middle Ages
    - Economy of Scotland in the High Middle Ages
    - Legal institutions of Scotland in the High Middle Ages
    - Society of Scotland in the High Middle Ages
    - Warfare of Scotland in the High Middle Ages
  - Scotland in the Late Middle Ages
- History of medieval Serbia
  - Sarajevo during the Middle Ages
- Spain in the Middle Ages
- Medieval Thessalonica
- Thessaly in the Middle Ages
- Wales in the Middle Ages
  - Wales in the Early Middle Ages
  - Wales in the High Middle Ages
  - Wales in the Late Middle Ages

=== Medieval history by subject ===
- Agriculture in the Middle Ages
- Allegory in the Middle Ages
- Medieval archaeology
- Medieval armies
  - Byzantine army
  - Medieval Bulgarian army
  - Great Heathen Army
  - Komnenian army
  - Moldavian military forces
  - Sassanid army
  - Wallachian military forces
- Medieval art
- Medieval dance
- Medieval music
- Medieval poetry
- Medieval theatre
- Medieval architecture
  - Castle
  - Medieval churches of York
  - Medieval fortification
- Medieval Christianity
- Medieval climate
  - Medieval Warm Period
- Medieval communes
- Medieval chronological timeline
- Crisis of the Late Middle Ages
- Crusades
- Medieval cuisine
- Medieval culture
  - Byzantine silk
  - Market town
- Medieval demography
- Medieval education
  - Medieval university
- Medieval etymology
- Medieval gardening
- Medieval guilds
- Horses in the Middle Ages
- Medieval household
- Medieval hunting
- Medieval Inquisition
- History of the Jews in the Middle Ages
- Medieval languages
  - Middle English
  - Medieval Greek
  - Medieval Hebrew
  - Old Church Slavonic
  - Old Irish language
  - Middle Irish language
  - Medieval Latin
  - Middle Welsh language
- Medieval literature
  - Medieval Bulgarian literature
  - Medieval Dutch literature
  - Medieval French literature
  - Medieval German literature
  - Early Irish literature
  - Medieval numeral
  - Medieval poetry
  - Romance (heroic literature)
  - Medieval Welsh literature
- Medieval maritime culture
- Medieval medicine of Western Europe
  - Black Death
- Medieval money
  - Bezant
- Medieval philosophy
- Medieval religion
  - Allegory in the Middle Ages
  - Christian monasticism
  - Medieval churches of York
  - Medieval Roman Catholic Missions in China
- Medieval science
  - Alchemy
- Slave trade in the Middle Ages
- Medieval sport
  - Medieval football
  - Medieval tournament
- Medieval superstition
  - Medieval revenant
  - Medieval witchcraft
- Medieval technology
- Medieval warfare
  - Byzantine battle tactics
  - Castle
  - Crusades
  - Medieval fortification
  - Siege engine
  - Warfare of Scotland in the High Middle Ages
- Medieval wonders
  - Seven wonders of the Middle Ages

== History of medieval history ==
Middle Ages in history

- The Autumn of the Middle Ages
- Dictionary of the Middle Ages
- English historians in the Middle Ages
- Medieval archaeology
- Medievalism
- Medievalist
- Medieval fantasy
- Medieval popular Bible
- Medieval reenactment
- Middle Ages in film
- Neo-medievalism
- Medieval food
- Category:Medieval law

== Medieval history scholars ==
Medievalist

- Umberto Eco
- David Herlihy

== Medieval historical societies ==
- Medieval Academy of America
- Medieval Chronicle Society
- Medieval Combat Society
- Medieval Scenarios and Recreations
- The Medieval Siege Society

== Medieval themed festivals and recreational events ==
- Medieval Market of Turku
- Medieval reenactment
- Medieval Times

== Leaders during the Middle Ages ==
- Charlemagne
- List of English monarchs
- List of Frankish kings
- Holy Roman Emperor

== Related lists ==
Medieval chronological timeline

- List of medieval abbreviations
- List of medieval land terms
- List of medieval weapons

== See also ==
- Cultural movement
- History by period
- History of Europe
- List of time periods
- Periodization
