= Late Middle Ages =

Period of European history between AD 1300 and 1500

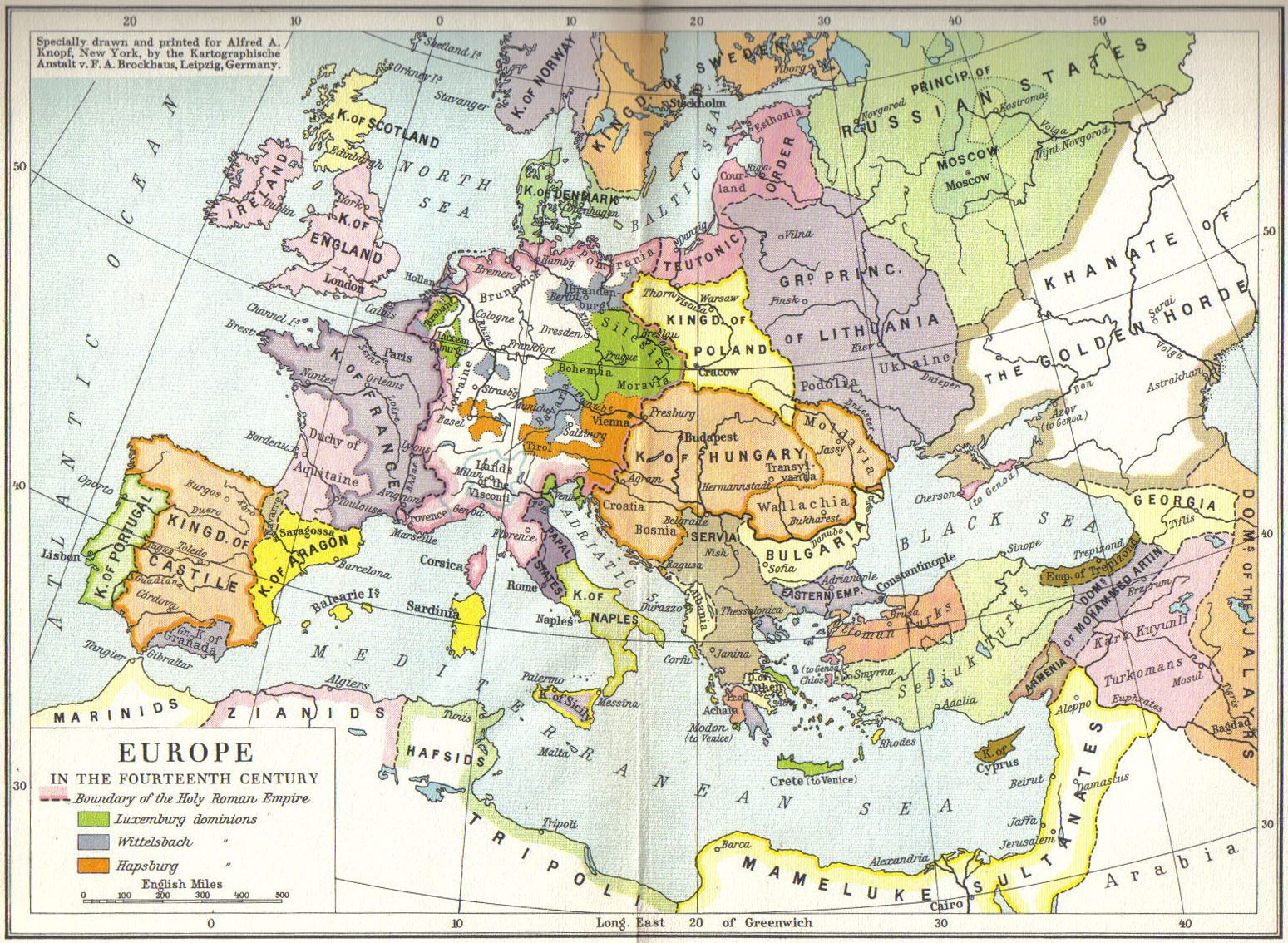
Europe and the Mediterranean region, c. 1354

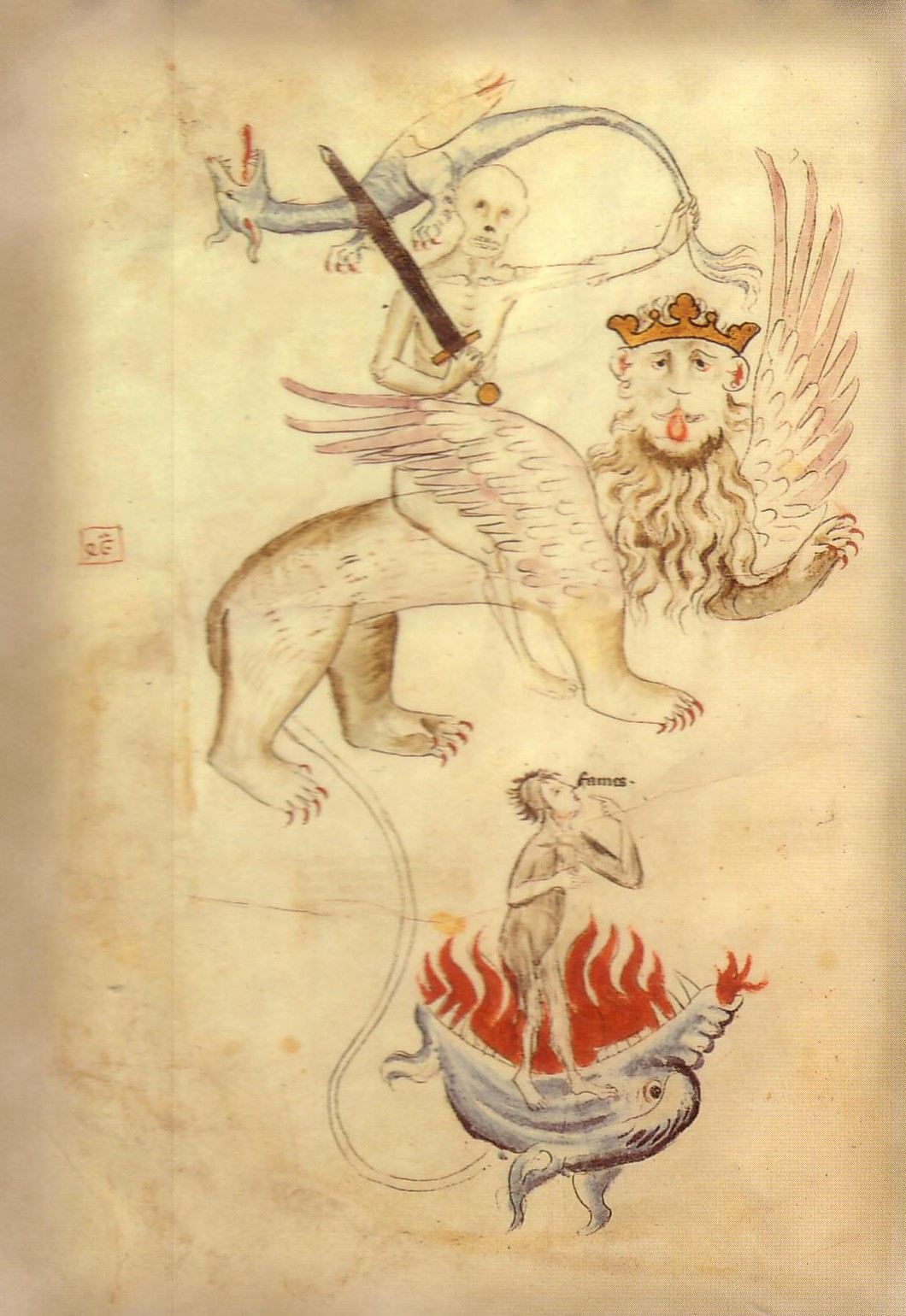
From the Apocalypse in a Biblia Pauperum illuminated at Erfurt around the time of the Great Famine. Death sits astride a lion whose long tail ends in a ball of flame (Hell). Famine points to her hungry mouth.

The late Middle Ages or late medieval period was the period of European history lasting from 1300 to 1500 AD. The late Middle Ages followed the High Middle Ages and preceded Early modern Europe (and in much of Europe, the Renaissance).

Around 1350, centuries of prosperity and growth in Europe came to a halt. A series of famines and plagues, including the Great Famine of 1315–1317 and the Black Death, reduced the population to around half of what it had been before the calamities. Along with depopulation came social unrest and endemic warfare. France and England experienced serious peasant uprisings, such as the Jacquerie and the Peasants' Revolt, as well as over a century of intermittent conflict, the Hundred Years' War. To add to the many problems of the period, the unity of the Catholic Church was temporarily shattered by the Western Schism. Collectively, those events are sometimes called the crisis of the late Middle Ages.

Despite the crises, the 14th century was also a time of great progress in the arts and sciences. Following a renewed interest in ancient Greek and Roman texts that took root in the High Middle Ages, the Italian Renaissance began. The absorption of Latin texts had started before the Renaissance of the 12th century through contact with Arabs during the Crusades, but the availability of important Greek texts accelerated with the fall of Constantinople to the Ottoman Turks, when many Byzantine scholars had to seek refuge in the West, particularly Italy.

Combined with this influx of classical ideas was the invention and rapid spread of printing, which facilitated the dissemination of the printed word and democratized learning. These two developments would later contribute to the Reformation. Toward the end of the period, the Age of Discovery began. The expansion of the Ottoman Empire cut off trading possibilities with the East. Europeans were forced to seek new trading routes, leading to the Spanish expedition under Christopher Columbus to the Americas in 1492 and Vasco da Gama's voyage to Africa and India in 1498. Their discoveries strengthened the economy and power of European nations.

The changes brought about by these developments have led many scholars to view this period as the end of the Middle Ages and the beginning of modern history and of early modern Europe. However, the division is somewhat artificial, since ancient learning was never entirely absent from European society. As a result, there was developmental continuity between the ancient age (via classical antiquity) and the modern age. Some historians, particularly in Italy, prefer not to speak of the late Middle Ages at all; rather, they see the high period of the Middle Ages transitioning to the Renaissance and the modern era.

== Historiography and periodization ==
The term "late Middle Ages" refers to one of the three periods of the Middle Ages, along with the early Middle Ages and the High Middle Ages. Leonardo Bruni was the first historian to use the tripartite periodization in his History of the Florentine People (1442). Flavio Biondo used a similar framework in Decades of History from the Deterioration of the Roman Empire (1439–1453). The tripartite periodization became standard after the German historian Christoph Cellarius published Universal History Divided into an Ancient, Medieval, and New Period (1683).

For 18th-century historians studying the 14th and 15th centuries, the central theme was the Renaissance, with its rediscovery of ancient learning and the emergence of an individual spirit. The heart of this rediscovery lies in Italy, where, in the words of Jacob Burckhardt, "Man became a spiritual individual and recognized himself as such." This proposition was later challenged, and it was argued that the 12th century was a period of greater cultural achievement.

As economic and demographic methods were applied to the study of history, the trend was increasingly to see the late Middle Ages as a period of recession and crisis. Belgian historian Henri Pirenne continued the subdivision of Early, High, and late Middle Ages in the years around World War I. Yet it was his Dutch colleague, Johan Huizinga, who was primarily responsible for popularising the pessimistic view of the late Middle Ages, with his book The Autumn of the Middle Ages (1919). To Huizinga, whose research focused on France and the Low Countries rather than Italy, despair and decline were the main themes, not rebirth.

Modern historiography on the period has reached a consensus between the two extremes of innovation and crisis. It is now generally acknowledged that conditions were vastly different north and south of the Alps, and the term "late Middle Ages" is often avoided entirely within Italian historiography. The term "Renaissance" is still considered useful for describing certain intellectual, cultural, or artistic developments but not as the defining feature of an entire European historical epoch. The period from the early 14th century up until – and sometimes including – the 16th century is rather seen as characterized by other trends: demographic and economic decline followed by recovery, the end of Western religious unity and the subsequent emergence of the nation-state, and the expansion of European influence onto the rest of the world.

== History ==
The limits of Christian Europe were still being defined in the 14th and 15th centuries. While the Grand Duchy of Moscow was beginning to repel the Mongols, and the Iberian kingdoms were completing the Reconquista of the peninsula and turning their attention outward, the Balkans fell under the dominance of the Ottoman Empire. (Note: For references, see below.) Meanwhile, the remaining nations of the continent were locked in almost constant international or internal conflict.

This prolonged instability, along with the decline of feudalism, growing royal bureaucracies, and the printing press's role in standardizing vernacular languages, gradually led to the consolidation of central authority and the emergence of the nation state. The financial demands of war necessitated higher levels of taxation, resulting in the emergence of representative bodies – most notably the English Parliament. The growth of secular authority was further aided by the decline of the papacy with the Western Schism and the coming of the Protestant Reformation.

=== Northern Europe ===
After the failed union of Sweden and Norway of 1319–1365, the pan-Scandinavian Kalmar Union, that also included Denmark, was instituted in 1397. The Swedes were reluctant members of the union from the start. In an attempt to subdue the Swedes, King Christian II of Denmark had large numbers of the Swedish aristocracy killed in the Stockholm Bloodbath of 1520. Yet this measure only led to further hostilities, and Sweden broke away for good in 1523. Norway, on the other hand, became an inferior party of the union and remained united with Denmark until 1814.

Iceland benefited from its relative isolation and was the last Scandinavian country to be struck by the Black Death. Meanwhile, the Norse colony in Greenland died out, probably under extreme weather conditions in the 15th century. These conditions might have been the effect of the Little Ice Age.

=== Northwest Europe ===
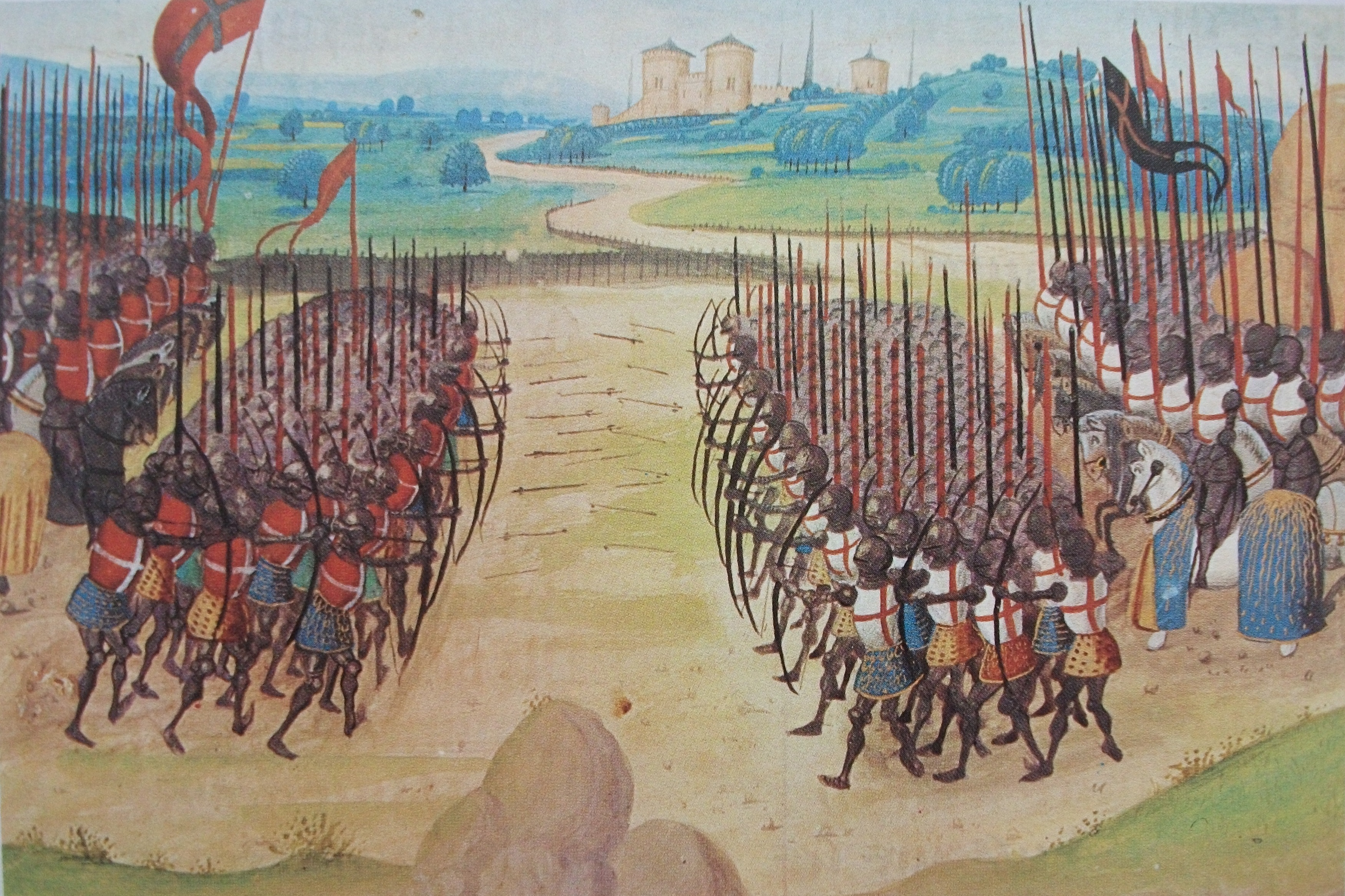
The Battle of Agincourt, 15th-century miniature, Enguerrand de Monstrelet

The death of Alexander III of Scotland in 1286 threw the country into a succession crisis, and the English king, Edward I, was brought in to arbitrate. Edward claimed overlordship over Scotland, leading to the Wars of Scottish Independence. The English were eventually defeated, and the Scots were able to develop a stronger state under the Stewarts.

From 1337, England's attention was largely directed towards France in the Hundred Years' War. Henry V's victory at the Battle of Agincourt in 1415 briefly paved the way for a unification of the two kingdoms, but his son Henry VI soon squandered all previous gains. The loss of France led to discontent at home. Soon after the end of the war in 1453, the dynastic struggles of the Wars of the Roses (c. 1455–1485) began, involving the rival dynasties of the House of Lancaster and House of York.

The war ended in the accession of Henry VII of the House of Tudor, who continued the work started by the Yorkist kings of building a strong, centralized monarchy. While England's attention was thus directed elsewhere, the Hiberno-Norman lords in Ireland were becoming gradually more assimilated into Irish society, and the island was allowed to develop virtual independence under English overlordship.

=== Western Europe ===
France by 1477: a mosaic of feudal territories

The French House of Valois, which followed the House of Capet in 1328, was at its outset marginalized in its own country, first by the English invading forces of the Hundred Years' War and later by the powerful Duchy of Burgundy. The emergence of Joan of Arc as a military leader changed the course of war in favor of the French, and the initiative was carried further by King Louis XI.

Meanwhile, Charles the Bold, Duke of Burgundy, met resistance in his attempts to consolidate his possessions, particularly from the Swiss Confederation formed in 1291. When Charles was killed in the Burgundian Wars at the Battle of Nancy in 1477, the Duchy of Burgundy was reclaimed by France. At the same time, the County of Burgundy and the wealthy Burgundian Netherlands came into the Holy Roman Empire under Habsburg control, setting up conflict for centuries to come.

=== Central Europe ===
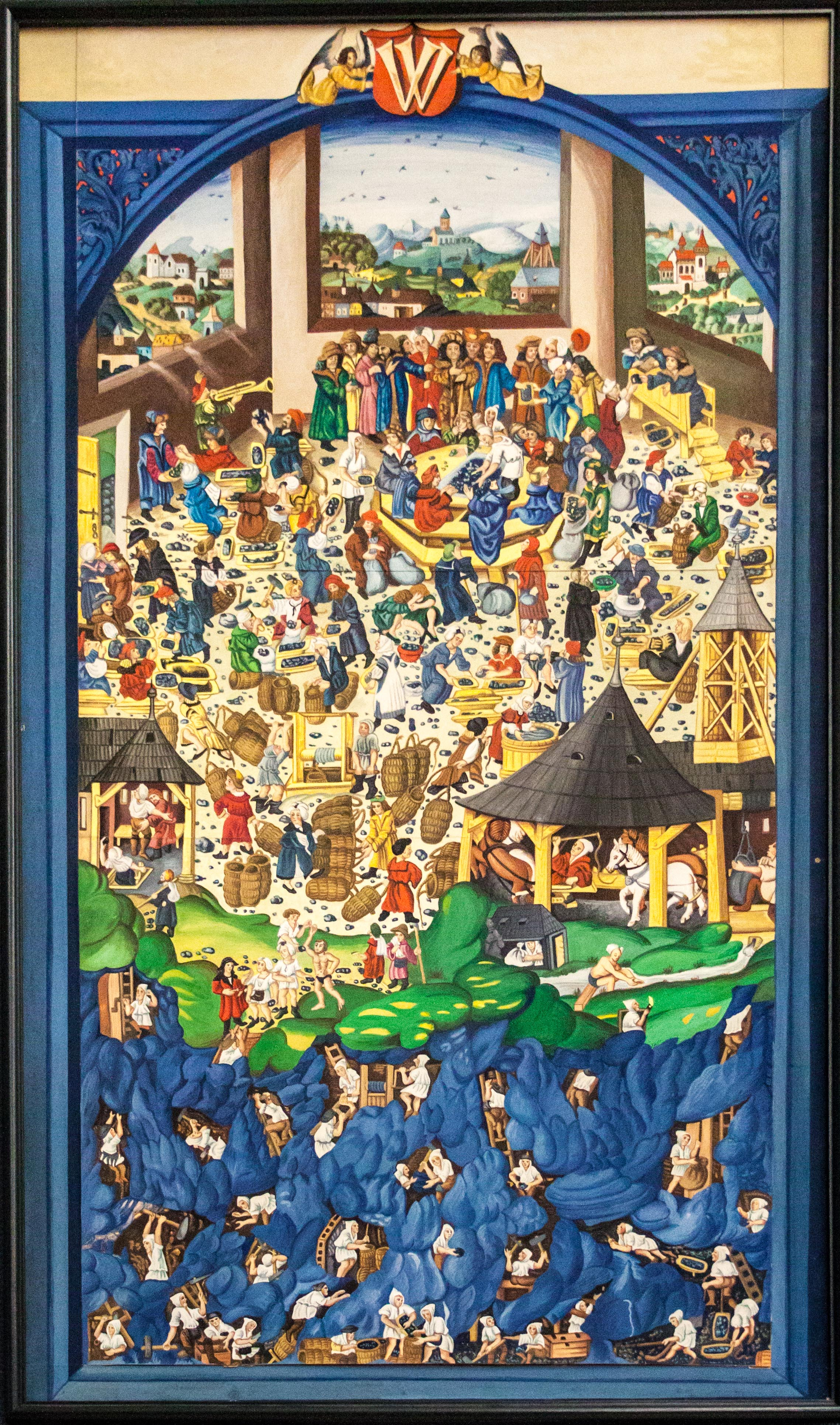
Silver mining and processing in Kutná Hora, Bohemia, 15th century

Bohemia prospered in the 14th century, and the Golden Bull of 1356 made the king of Bohemia the first among the imperial electors, but the Hussite revolution threw the country into crisis. The Holy Roman Empire passed to the House of Habsburg in 1438, where it remained until its dissolution in 1806. Yet in spite of the extensive territories held by the Habsburgs, the Empire itself remained fragmented, and much real power and influence lay with the individual principalities. In addition, financial institutions, such as the Hanseatic League and the Fugger family, held great power, on both economic and political levels.

The Kingdom of Hungary experienced a golden age during the 14th century. In particular the reigns of the Angevin kings Charles Robert (1308–42) and his son Louis the Great (1342–82) were marked by success. The country grew wealthy as the main European supplier of gold and silver. Louis the Great led successful campaigns from Lithuania to Southern Italy, and from Poland to Northern Greece.

He had the greatest military potential of the 14th century with his enormous armies (often over 100,000 men). Meanwhile, Poland's attention was turned eastwards, as its Commonwealth with Lithuania created an enormous entity in the region. The union, and the conversion of Lithuania, also marked the end of paganism in Europe.

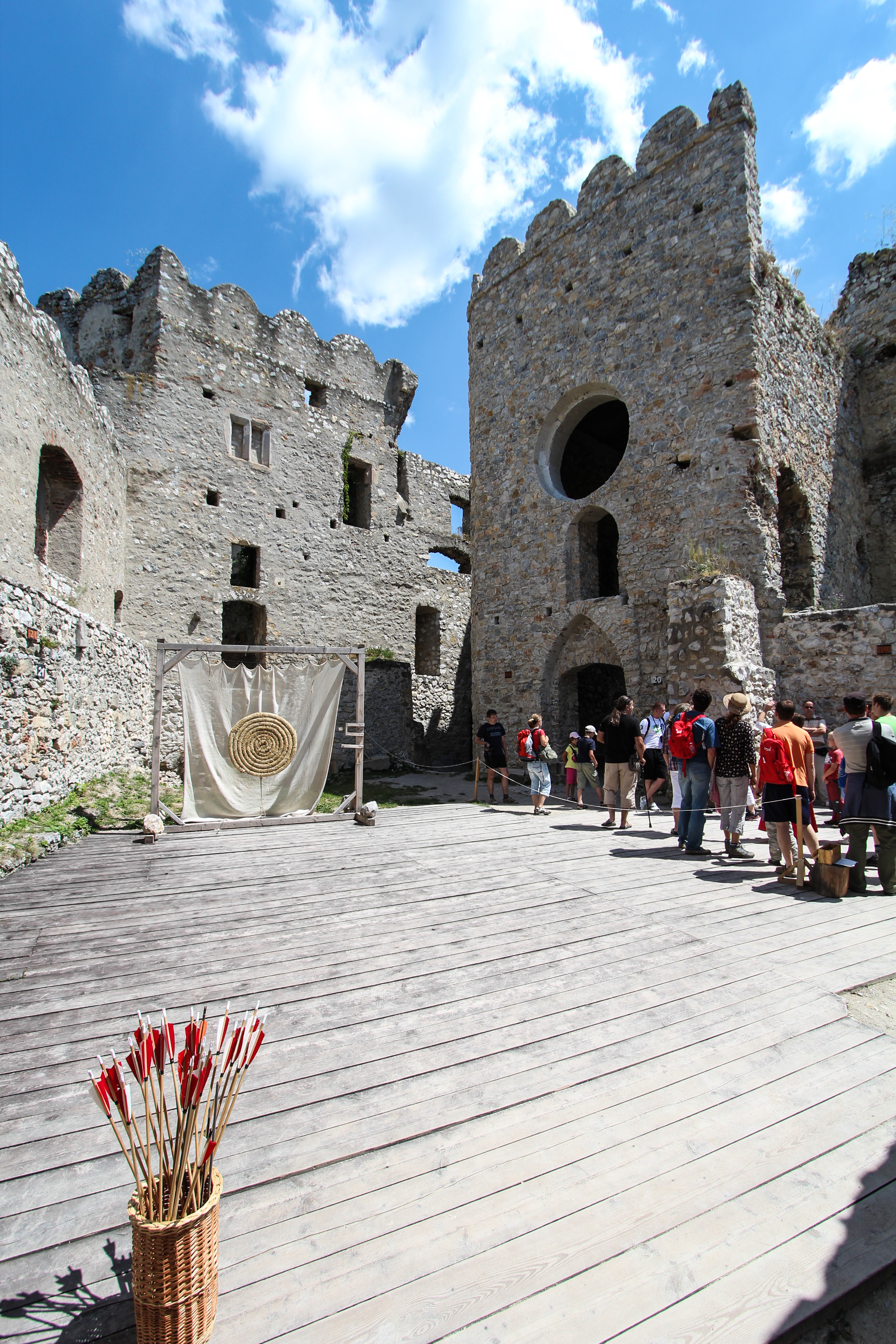
Ruins of Beckov Castle in Slovakia

Louis did not leave a son as heir after his death in 1382. Instead, he named as his heir the young prince Sigismund of Luxemburg. The Hungarian nobility did not accept his claim, and the result was an internal war. Sigismund eventually achieved total control of Hungary and established his court in Buda and Visegrád. Both palaces were rebuilt and improved, and were considered the richest of the time in Europe. Inheriting the throne of Bohemia and the Holy Roman Empire, Sigismund continued conducting his politics from Hungary, but he was kept busy fighting the Hussites and the Ottoman Empire, which was becoming a menace to Europe in the beginning of the 15th century.

King Matthias Corvinus of Hungary led the largest army of mercenaries of the time, the Black Army of Hungary, which he used to conquer Moravia and Austria and to fight the Ottoman Empire. After Italy, Hungary was the first European country where the Renaissance appeared. However, the glory of the Kingdom ended in the early 16th century, when the King Louis II of Hungary was killed in the Battle of Mohács in 1526 against the Ottoman Empire. Hungary then fell into a serious crisis and was invaded, ending its significance in central Europe during the medieval era.

=== Eastern Europe ===
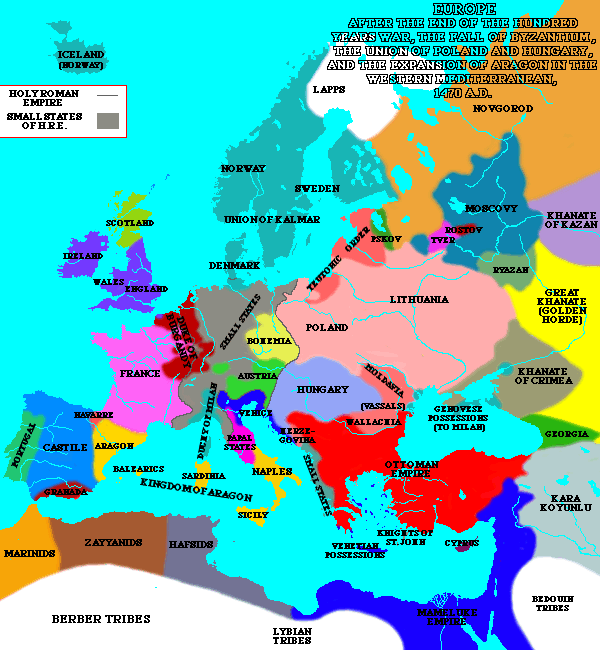
Medieval Russian states c. 1470, including Novgorod, Tver, Pskov, Ryazan, Rostov and Moscow

Kievan Rus' fell as a result of the 13th-century Mongol invasions. The Grand Principality of Moscow became the dominant Russian principality thereafter, winning a great victory against the Golden Horde at the Battle of Kulikovo in 1380. However, the victory did not end Tatar rule in the region and its immediate beneficiary was the Grand Duchy of Lithuania, which extended its influence eastwards.

During the reign of Ivan the Great (1462–1505), Moscow became a major regional power, and the annexation of the Republic of Novgorod in 1478 laid the foundations for a Russian national state. After the fall of Constantinople in 1453, the Russian princes started to see themselves as the heirs of the Byzantine Empire. They eventually took on the imperial title of tsar, and Moscow was described as the Third Rome.

=== Southeast Europe ===
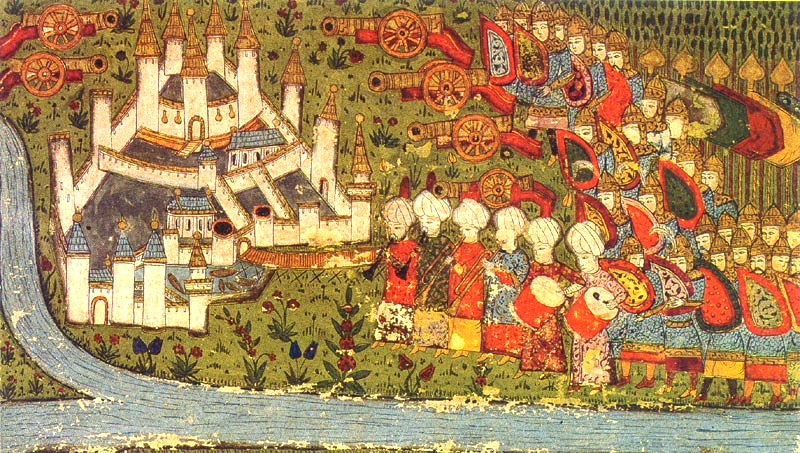
Ottoman miniature of the siege of Belgrade in 1456

The Byzantine Empire had for a long time dominated the eastern Mediterranean in politics and culture. By the 14th century, however, it had almost entirely collapsed into a tributary state of the Ottoman Empire, centered on the city of Constantinople and a few enclaves in Greece. With the Fall of Constantinople in 1453, the Byzantine Empire was permanently extinguished.

The Bulgarian Empire was in decline by the 14th century, and the ascendancy of Serbia was marked by the Serbian victory over the Bulgarians in the Battle of Velbazhd in 1330. By 1346, the Serbian king Stefan Dušan had been proclaimed emperor. Yet Serbian dominance was short-lived; the Serbian army led by Lazar Hrebeljanovic was defeated by the Ottoman Army at the Battle of Kosovo in 1389, where most of the Serbian nobility was killed and the south of the country came under Ottoman occupation, as much of southern Bulgaria had become Ottoman territory in the Battle of Maritsa 1371. Northern remnants of Bulgaria were finally conquered by 1396, Serbia fell in 1459, Bosnia in 1463, and Albania was finally subordinated in 1479 only a few years after the death of Skanderbeg. Belgrade, a Hungarian domain at the time, was the last large Balkan city to fall under Ottoman rule, in the siege of Belgrade of 1521. By the end of the medieval period, the entire Balkan peninsula was annexed by, or became vassal to, the Ottomans.

=== Southwest Europe ===
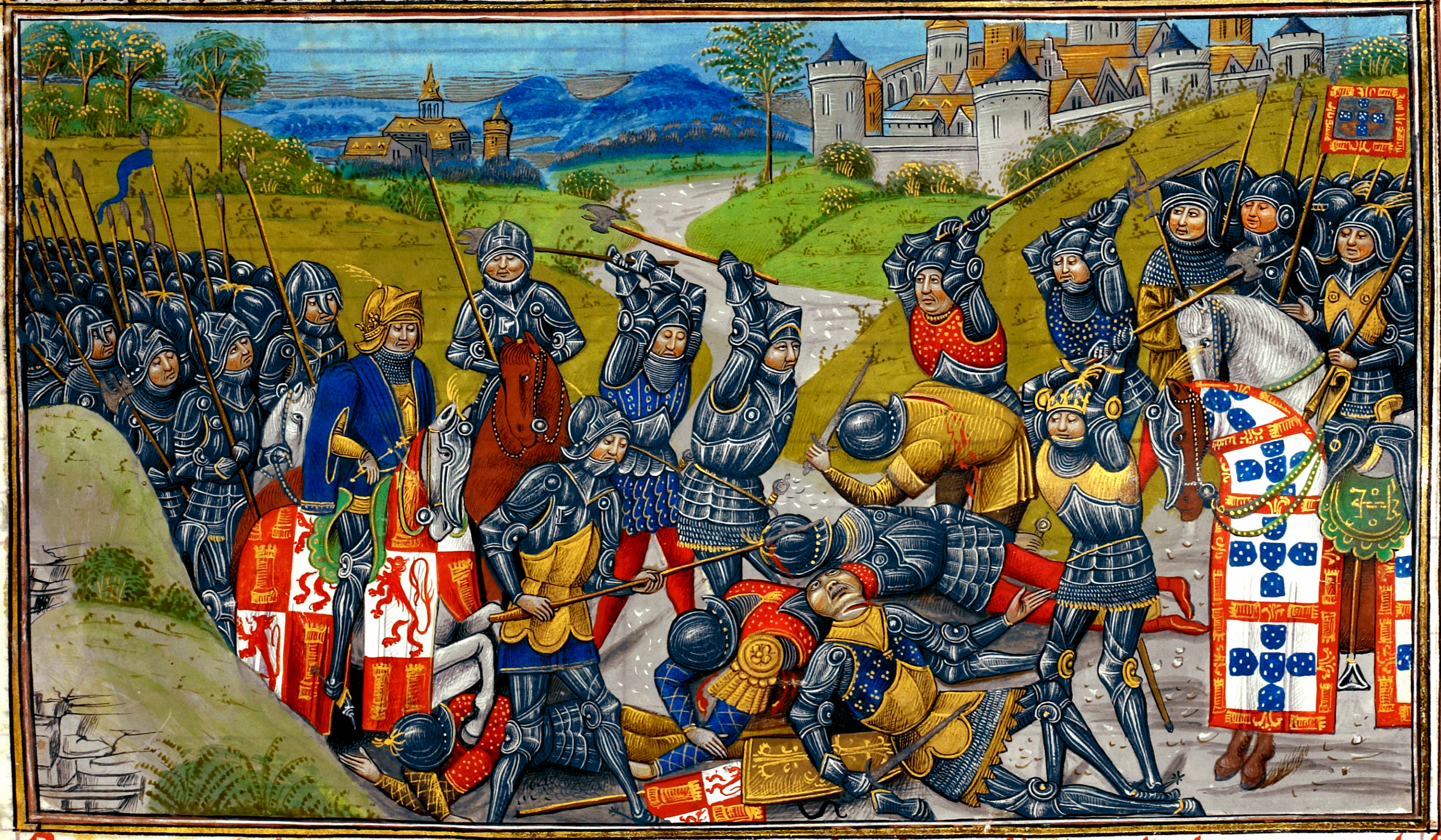
Battle of Aljubarrota between Portugal and Castile, 1385

Avignon was the seat of the papacy from 1309 to 1376. With the return of the Pope to Rome in 1378, the Papal State developed into a major secular power, culminating in the morally corrupt papacy of Alexander VI. Florence grew to prominence amongst the Italian city-states through financial business, and the dominant Medici family became important promoters of the Renaissance through their patronage of the arts. Other city-states in northern Italy also expanded their territories and consolidated their power, primarily Milan, Venice, and Genoa. The War of the Sicilian Vespers had by the early 14th century divided southern Italy into an Aragon Kingdom of Sicily and an Anjou Kingdom of Naples. In 1442, the two kingdoms were effectively united under Aragonese control.

The 1469 marriage of Isabella I of Castile and Ferdinand II of Aragon and the 1479 death of John II of Aragon led to the creation of modern-day Spain. In 1492, Granada was captured from the Moors, thereby completing the Reconquista. Portugal had during the 15th century – particularly under Henry the Navigator – gradually explored the coast of Africa, and in 1498, Vasco da Gama found the sea route to India. The Spanish monarchs met the Portuguese challenge by financing the expedition of Christopher Columbus to find a western sea route to India, leading to the discovery of the Americas in 1492.

== Late medieval European society ==
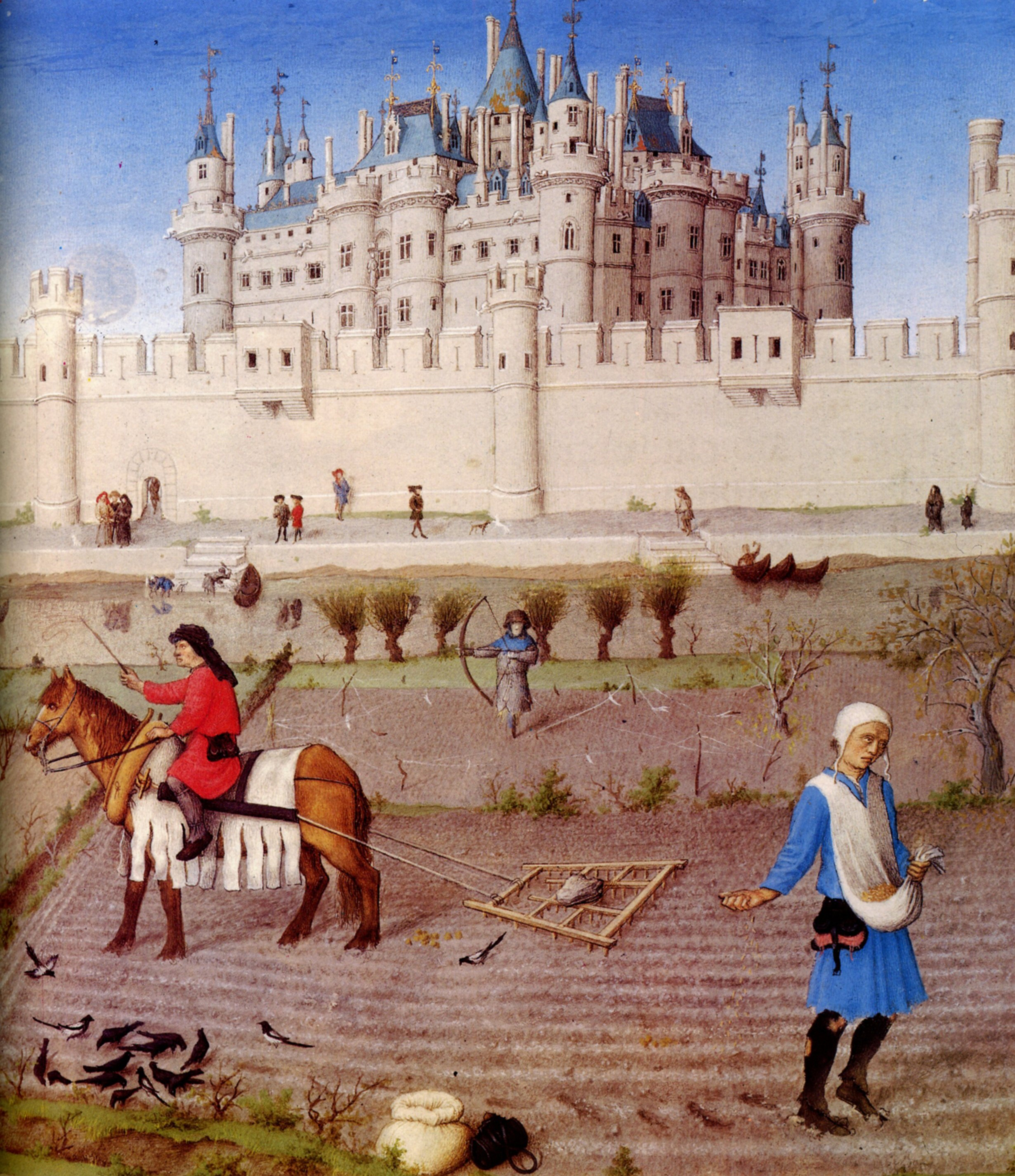
Peasants preparing the fields for the winter with a harrow and sowing for the winter grain. The background shows the Louvre castle in Paris, c. 1410; October as depicted in the Très Riches Heures du Duc de Berry.

Around 1300–1350, the Medieval Warm Period gave way to the Little Ice Age. The colder climate resulted in agricultural crises, the first of which is known as the Great Famine of 1315–1317. The demographic consequences of this famine, however, were not as severe as the plagues that occurred later in the century, particularly the Black Death. Estimates of the death rate caused by this epidemic range from one third to as much as sixty percent. By around 1420, the accumulated effect of recurring plagues and famines had reduced the population of Europe to perhaps no more than a third of what it was a century earlier. The effects of natural disasters were exacerbated by armed conflicts; this was particularly the case in France during the Hundred Years' War. It took 150 years for the European population to regain similar levels to 1300.

As the European population was severely reduced, land became more plentiful for the survivors, and labour was consequently more expensive. Attempts by landowners to forcibly reduce wages, such as the English 1351 Statute of Laborers, were doomed to fail. These efforts resulted in nothing more than fostering resentment among the peasantry, leading to rebellions such as the French Jacquerie in 1358 and the English Peasants' Revolt in 1381. The long-term effect was the virtual end of serfdom in Western Europe. In Eastern Europe, on the other hand, landowners were able to exploit the situation to force the peasantry into even more repressive bondage.

The upheavals caused by the Black Death left certain minority groups particularly vulnerable, especially the Jews, who were often blamed for the calamities. Anti-Jewish pogroms were carried out all over Europe; in February 1349, two thousand Jews were murdered in Strasbourg. States were also guilty of discrimination against the Jews. Monarchs gave in to the demands of the people, and the Jews were expelled from England in 1290, from France in 1306, from Spain in 1492, and from Portugal in 1497.

While the Jews were suffering persecution, one group that probably experienced increased empowerment in the late Middle Ages was women. The great social changes of the period opened up new possibilities for women in the fields of commerce, learning, and religion. Yet at the same time, women were also vulnerable to incrimination and persecution, as belief in witchcraft increased.

The accumulation of social, environmental, and health-related problems also led to an increase in interpersonal violence in most parts of Europe. Population increase, religious intolerance, famine, and disease led to an increase in violent acts in vast parts of medieval society. One exception to this was North-Eastern Europe, whose population managed to maintain low levels of violence due to a more organized society resulting from extensive and successful trade.

Up until the mid-14th century, Europe had experienced steadily increasing urbanization. Cities were also decimated by the Black Death, but the role of urban areas as centres of learning, commerce, and government ensured continued growth. By 1500, Venice, Milan, Naples, Paris, and Constantinople each probably had more than 100,000 inhabitants. Twenty-two other cities were larger than 40,000; most of these were in Italy and the Iberian peninsula, but there were also some in France, the Empire, and the Low Countries, as well as London in England.

== Military history ==
Medieval warfare

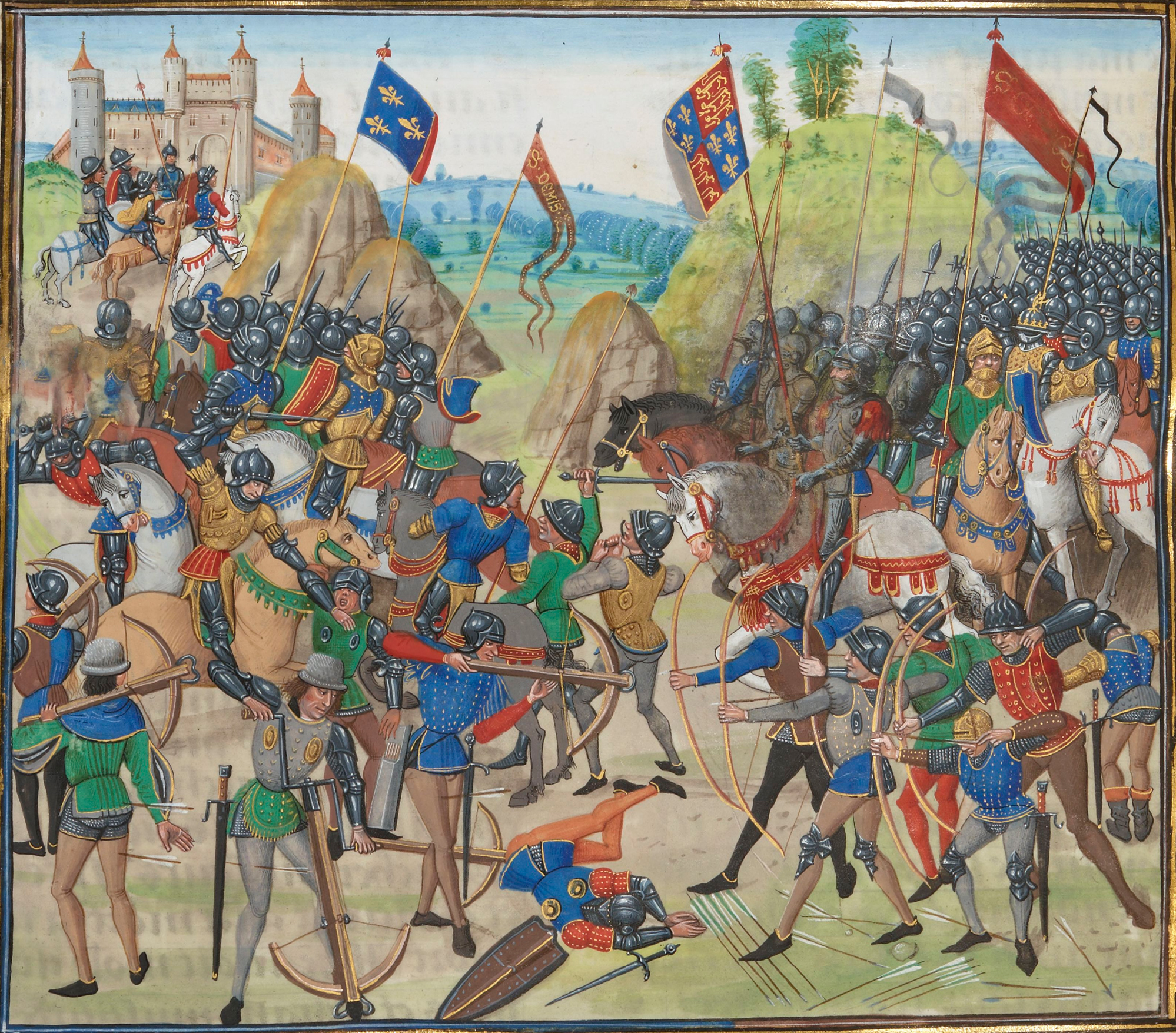
Miniature of the Battle of Crécy (1346) Manuscript of Jean Froissart's Chronicles. The Hundred Years' War saw many military innovations.

Through battles such as Courtrai (1302), Bannockburn (1314), and Morgarten (1315), it became clear to the great territorial princes of Europe that the military advantage of the feudal cavalry was lost and that a well equipped infantry was preferable. Through the Welsh Wars, the English became acquainted with, and adopted, the highly efficient longbow. Once properly managed, this weapon gave them a great advantage over the French in the Hundred Years' War.

Though employed by the English as early as the Battle of Crécy in 1346, firearms initially had little effect in the field of battle. It was through the use of cannons as siege weapons that major change was brought about; the new methods would eventually change the architectural structure of fortifications. Gunpowder eventually not only affected the field of battle but also caused major changes to military organisation and advanced the formation of nation states.

Changes also took place within the recruitment and composition of armies. The use of the national or feudal levy was gradually replaced by paid troops of domestic retinues or foreign mercenaries. The practice was associated with Edward III of England and the condottieri of the Italian city-states. All over Europe, Swiss mercenaries were in particularly high demand. At the same time, the period also saw the emergence of the first permanent armies. It was in Valois France, under the heavy demands of the Hundred Years' War, that the armed forces gradually assumed a permanent nature.

Parallel to the military developments emerged also a constantly more elaborate chivalric code of conduct for the warrior class. This newfound ethos can be seen as a response to the diminishing military role of the aristocracy, and it gradually became almost entirely detached from its military origin. The spirit of chivalry was given expression through the new (secular) type of chivalric orders; the first of these was the Order of St. George, founded by Charles I of Hungary in 1325, while the best known was probably the English Order of the Garter, founded by Edward III in 1348.

== Christian conflict and reform ==
=== The Papal Schism ===
The French crown's increasing dominance over the Papacy culminated in the transference of the Holy See to Avignon in 1309. When the Pope returned to Rome in 1377, this led to the election of different popes in Avignon and Rome, resulting in the Western Schism (1378–1417). The Schism divided Europe along political lines; while France, her ally Scotland, and the Spanish kingdoms supported the Avignon Papacy, France's enemy England stood behind the pope in Rome, together with Portugal, Scandinavia, and most of the German princes.

At the Council of Constance (1414–1418), the Papacy was once more united in Rome. Even though the unity of the Western Church was to last for another hundred years, and though the Papacy was to experience greater material prosperity than ever before, the Great Schism had done irreparable damage. The internal struggles within the Church had impaired her claim to universal rule and promoted anti-clericalism among the people and their rulers, paving the way for reform movements.

=== Protestant Reformation ===
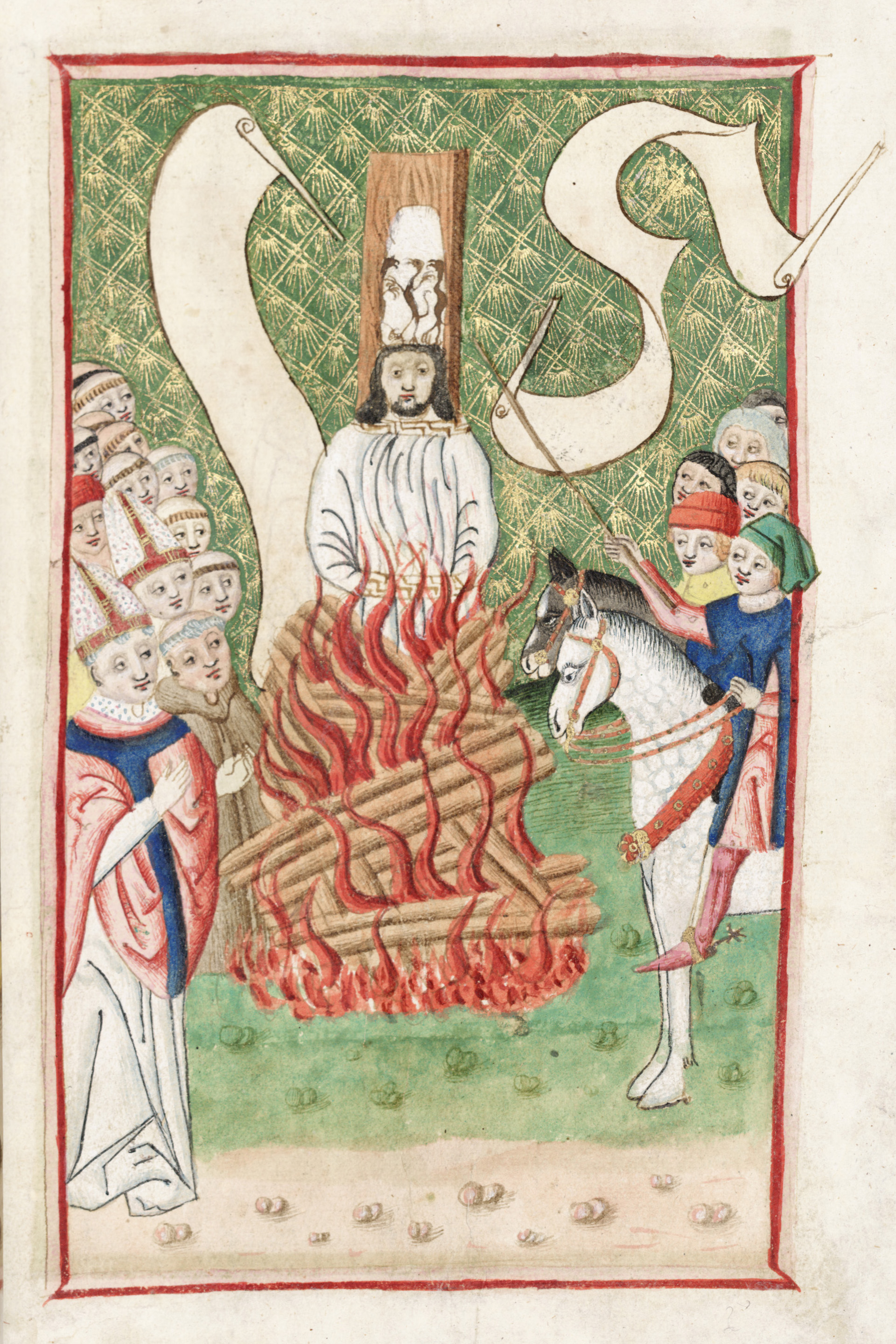
Jan Hus burnt at the stake

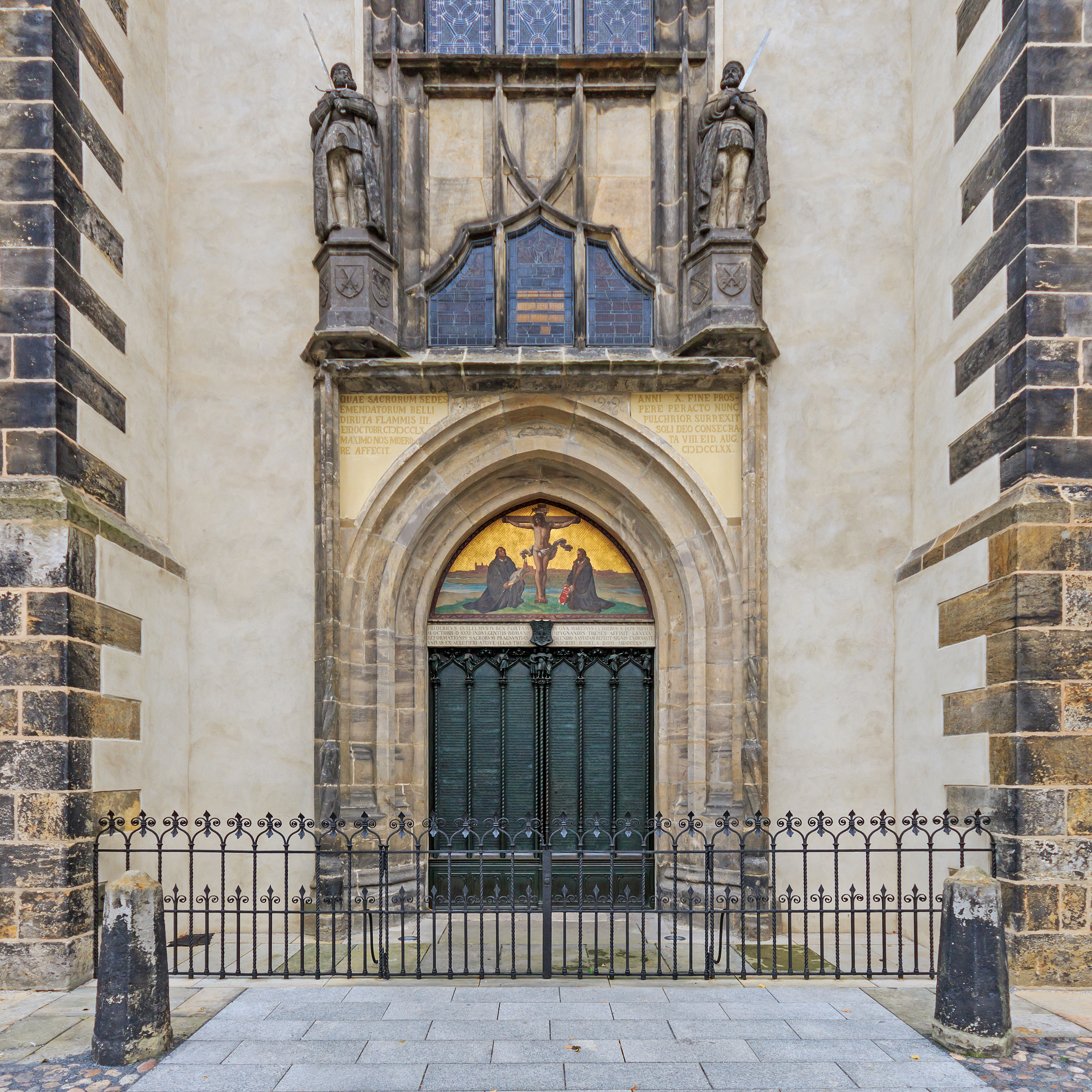
All Saints' Church in Wittenberg, where Martin Luther posted his Ninety-five Theses, giving rise to Protestantism

Though many of the events were outside the traditional time period of the Middle Ages, the end of the unity of the Western Church (the Protestant Reformation) was one of the distinguishing characteristics of the medieval period. The Catholic Church had long fought against heretic movements, but during the late Middle Ages, it started to experience demands for reform from within. The first of these came from Oxford professor John Wycliffe in England. Wycliffe held that the Bible should be the only authority in religious questions, and he spoke out against transubstantiation, celibacy, and indulgences. In spite of influential supporters among the English aristocracy, such as John of Gaunt, the movement was not allowed to survive. Though Wycliffe himself was left unmolested, his supporters, the Lollards, were eventually suppressed in England.

The marriage of Richard II of England to Anne of Bohemia established contacts between the two nations and brought Lollard ideas to her homeland. The teachings of the Czech priest Jan Hus were based on those of John Wycliffe, yet his followers, the Hussites, were to have a much greater political impact than the Lollards. Hus gained a great following in Bohemia, and in 1414, he was requested to appear at the Council of Constance to defend his cause. When he was burned as a heretic in 1415, it caused a popular uprising in the Czech lands. The subsequent Hussite Wars fell apart due to internal quarrels and did not result in religious or national independence for the Czechs, but both the Catholic Church and the German element within the country were weakened.

Martin Luther, a German monk, started the German Reformation by posting 95 theses on the castle church of Wittenberg on October 31, 1517. The immediate provocation spurring this act was Pope Leo X's renewal of the indulgence for the building of the new St. Peter's Basilica in 1514. Luther was challenged to recant his heresy at the Diet of Worms in 1521. When he refused, he was placed under the ban of the Empire by Charles V. Receiving the protection of Frederick the Wise, he was then able to translate the Bible into German.

To many secular rulers, the Protestant Reformation was a welcome opportunity to expand their wealth and influence. The Catholic Church met the challenges of the reforming movements with what has been called the Catholic Reformation, or Counter-Reformation. Europe became split into northern Protestant and southern Catholic parts, resulting in the Religious Wars of the 16th and 17th centuries.

== Trade and commerce ==
=== Major trade routes ===
Medieval merchant routes

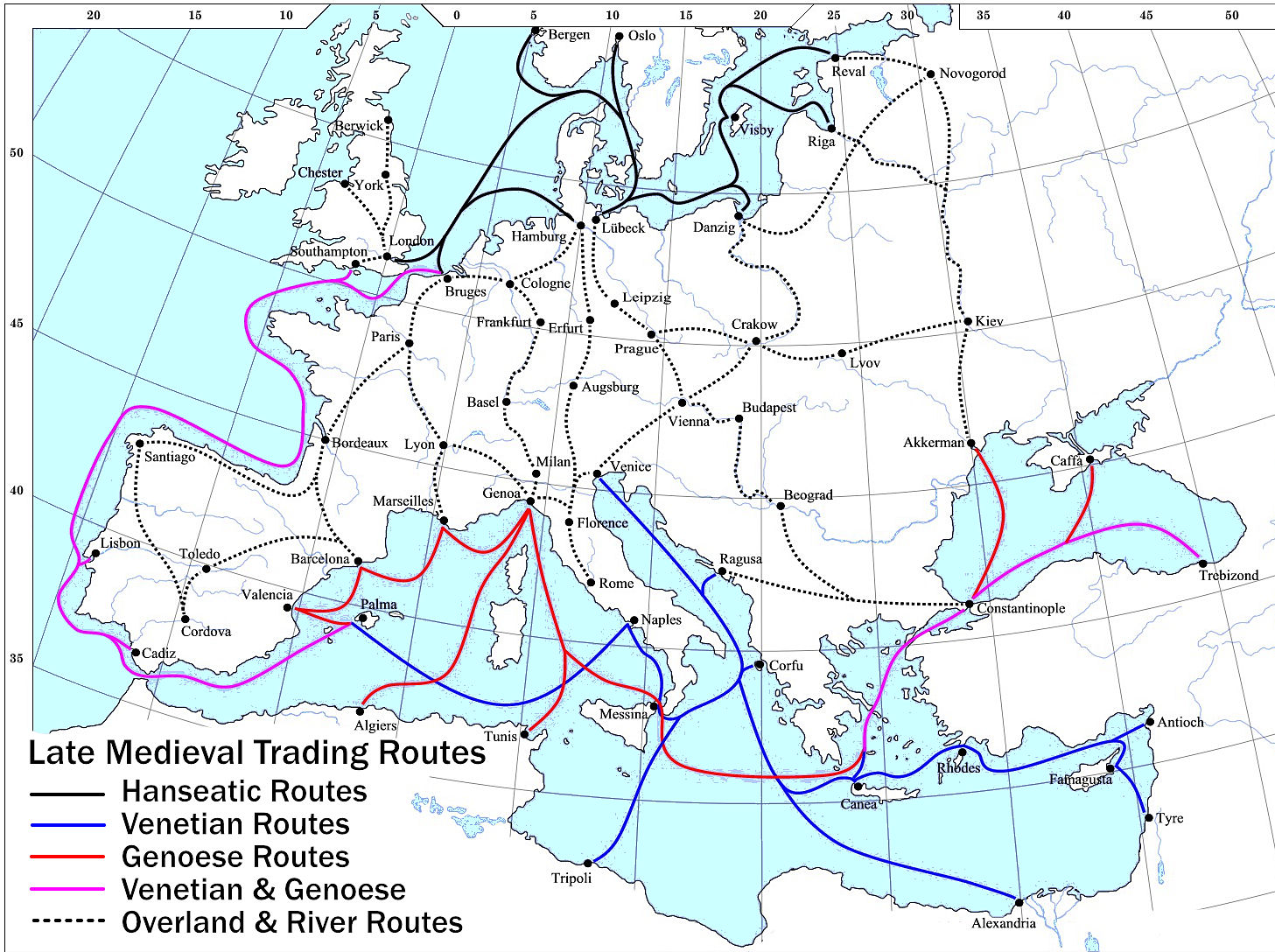
Main trade routes of late medieval Europe Hansa Venetian Genoese Venetian and Genoese (stippled) Overland and river routes

The increasingly dominant position of the Ottoman Empire in the eastern Mediterranean presented an impediment to trade for the Christian nations of the west, who in turn started looking for alternatives. Portuguese and Spanish explorers found new trade routes – south of Africa to India, as well as across the Atlantic Ocean to America. As Genoese and Venetian merchants opened up direct sea routes with Flanders, the Champagne fairs lost much of their importance.

=== Shifts in exports and the commercial revolution ===
At the same time, English wool export shifted from raw wool to processed cloth, resulting in losses for the cloth manufacturers of the Low Countries. In the Baltic and North Sea, the Hanseatic League reached the peak of their power in the 14th century but started going into decline in the fifteenth.

In the late 13th and early 14th centuries, a process took place – primarily in Italy but partly also in the Empire – that historians have termed a "commercial revolution". Among the innovations of the period were new forms of partnership and the issuing of insurance, both of which contributed to reducing the risk of commercial ventures; the bill of exchange and other forms of credit that circumvented the canonical laws for gentiles against usury and eliminated the dangers of carrying bullion; and new forms of accounting, in particular double-entry bookkeeping, which allowed for better oversight and accuracy.

With the financial expansion, trading rights became more jealously guarded by the commercial elite. Towns saw the growing power of guilds, while on a national level, special companies would be granted monopolies on particular trades, like the English wool Staple. The beneficiaries of these developments would accumulate immense wealth. Families like the Fuggers in Germany, the Medicis in Italy, and the de la Poles in England and individuals like Jacques Cœur in France would help finance the wars of kings, achieving great political influence in the process.

Though there is no doubt that the demographic crisis of the 14th century caused a dramatic fall in production and commerce in absolute terms, there has been a vigorous historical debate over whether the decline was greater than the fall in population. While the older orthodoxy held that the artistic output of the Renaissance was a result of greater opulence, more recent studies have suggested that there might have been a so-called "depression of the Renaissance". In spite of convincing arguments for the case, the statistical evidence is simply too incomplete for a definite conclusion to be made.

== Technology ==
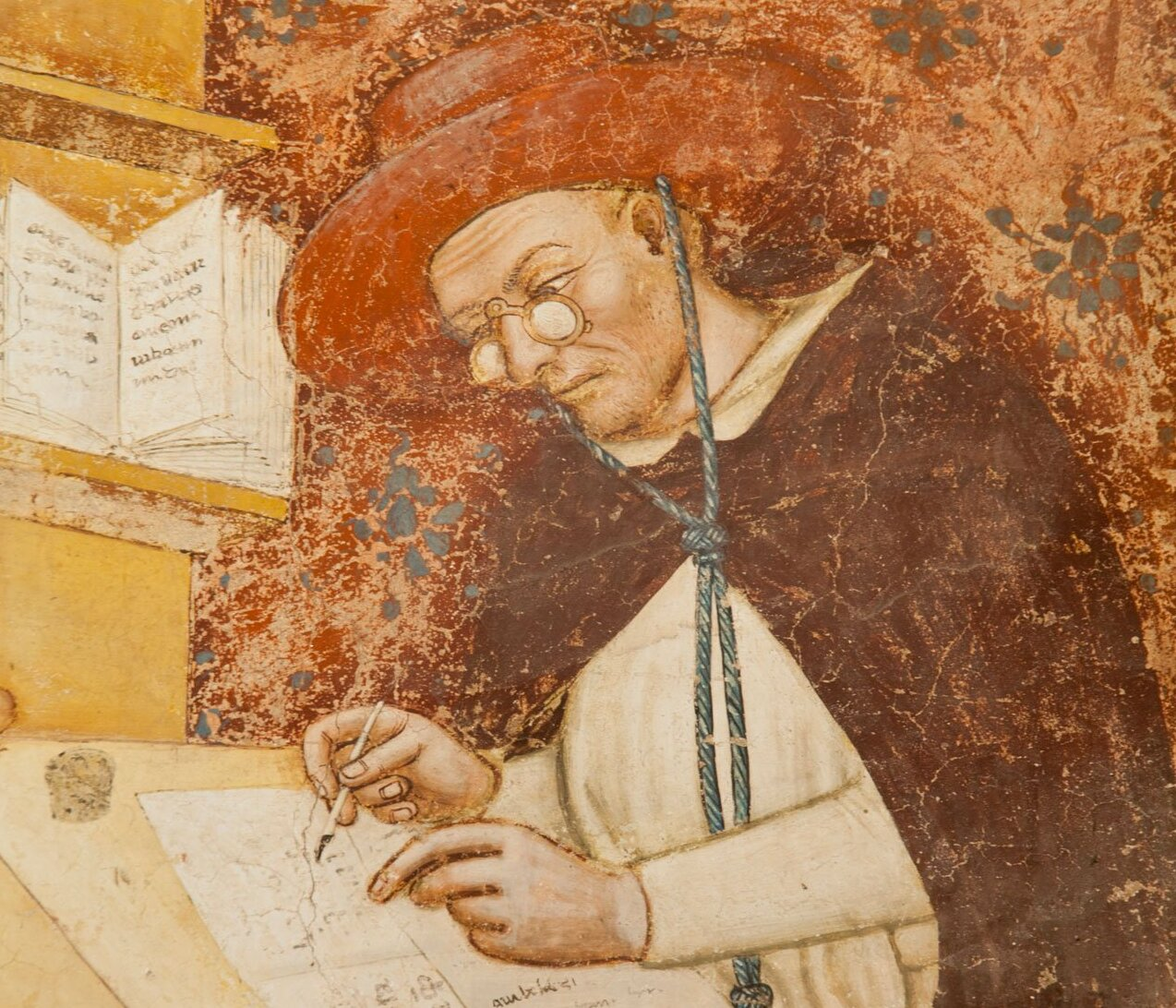
Detail of a portrait of Cardinal Hugh of Saint-Cher (wearing spectacles), painted by Tommaso da Modena in 1352

The earliest recorded comment on the use of glass for optical purposes was made in 1268 by Roger Bacon. The first eyeglasses were made in central Italy, most likely in Pisa or Florence, by about 1290, after which the widespread manufacture and use of optical glass for eyeglasses expanded rapidly in Europe. Venice became an important center of its manufacture (a separate guild of Venetian spectacle makers was formed in 1320). In the mid-15th century, Venetian glassmakers developed the exceptionally clear colourless glass, cristallo, used for luxury products like windows, mirrors, ships' lanterns, and lenses. When the first telescope was later invented during the Scientific Revolution, the first historical record of the invention did not appear in a work of natural philosophy but rather in a patent filed by a spectacle maker.

Spread of printing by Johannes Gutenberg from Mainz in Europe in the 15th century

From a single print shop in Mainz, Germany around 1440, the movable type printing-press had spread to no less than around 270 cities in Central, Western and Eastern Europe and had already produced more than 20 million volumes by the end of the 15th century. Printing made scholarly books more widely accessible, allowing researchers to consult ancient texts freely and to compare their own observations with those of fellow scholars. Printing ended the manuscript culture of the Middle Ages, where facts were few and far between, and replaced it with a printing culture where reliable and documented facts rapidly proliferated and became the secure foundation for scientific knowledge.

The compass, along with other innovations such as the cross-staff, the mariner's astrolabe, and advances in shipbuilding, enabled the navigation of the World Oceans and the early phases of colonialism.

== Arts and sciences ==
In the 14th century, the predominant academic trend of scholasticism was challenged by the humanist movement. Though primarily an attempt to revitalise the classical languages, the movement also led to innovations within the fields of science, art, and literature, helped by impulses from Byzantine scholars who had to seek refuge in the West after the Fall of Constantinople in 1453.

In science, classical authorities like Aristotle were challenged for the first time since antiquity. Within the arts, humanism took the form of the Renaissance. Though the 15th-century Renaissance was a highly localised phenomenon – limited mostly to the city-states of northern Italy – artistic developments were taking place also further north, particularly in the Netherlands.

=== Natural philosophy ===
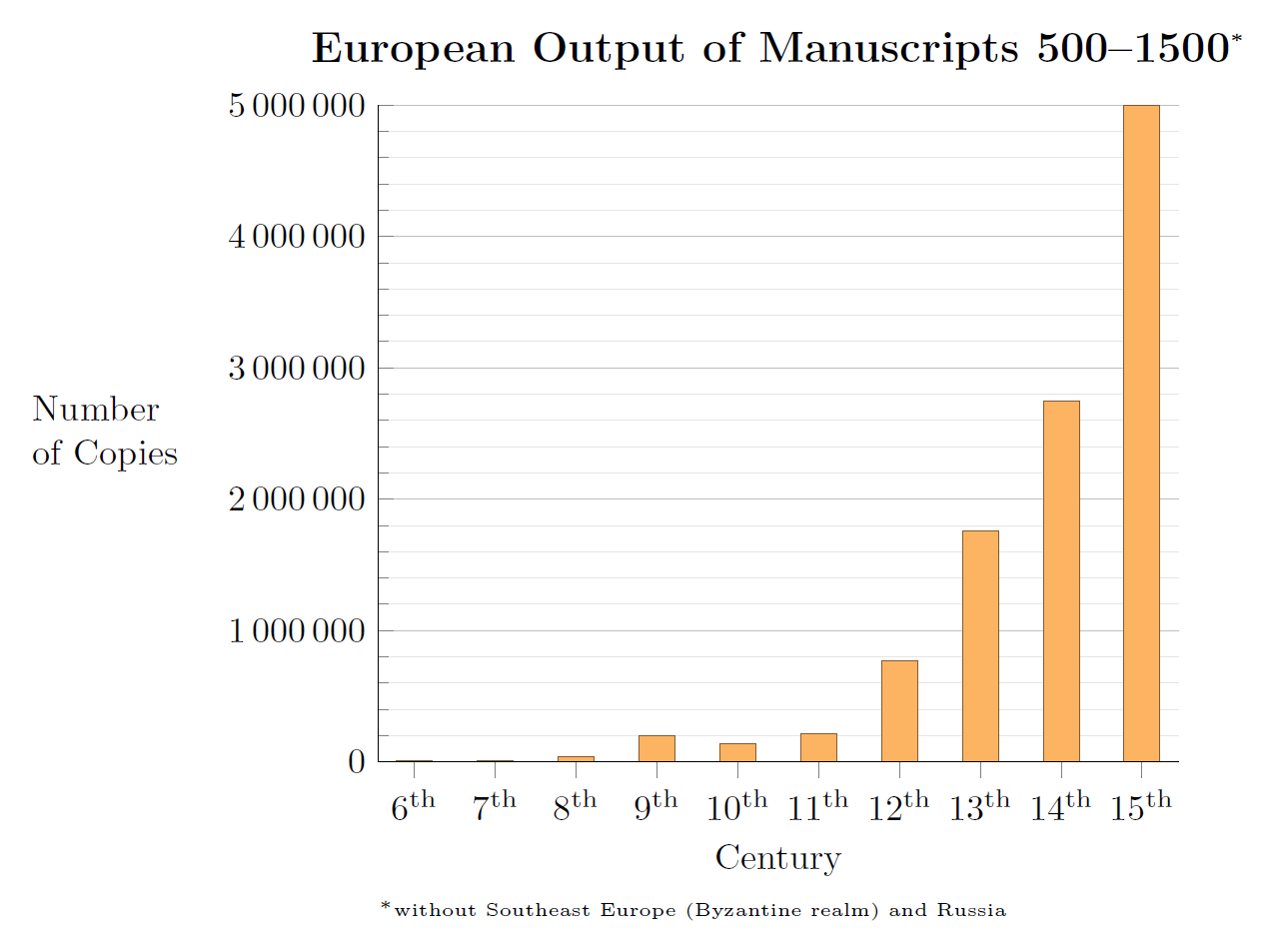
European output of manuscripts (500–1500). The rising trend in medieval book production saw its continuation in the period.

The predominant school of thought in the 13th century was the Thomistic reconciliation of the teachings of Aristotle with Christian theology. The Condemnation of 1277, enacted at the University of Paris, placed restrictions on ideas that could be interpreted as heretical, restrictions that had implication for Aristotelian thought. An alternative was presented by William of Ockham, following the manner of the earlier Franciscan John Duns Scotus, who insisted that the world of reason and the world of faith had to be kept apart. Ockham introduced the principle of parsimony – or Occam's razor – whereby a simple theory is preferred to a more complex one and speculation on unobservable phenomena is avoided. This maxim is, however, often misquoted. Occam was referring to his nominalism in this quotation. Essentially saying the theory of absolutes, or metaphysical realism, was unnecessary to make sense of the world.

This new approach liberated scientific speculation from the dogmatic restraints of Aristotelian science and paved the way for new approaches. Particularly within the field of theories of motion, great advances were made, when such scholars as Jean Buridan, Nicole Oresme, and the Oxford Calculators challenged the work of Aristotle. Buridan developed the theory of impetus as the cause of the motion of projectiles, which was an important step towards the modern concept of inertia.

=== Visual arts and architecture ===
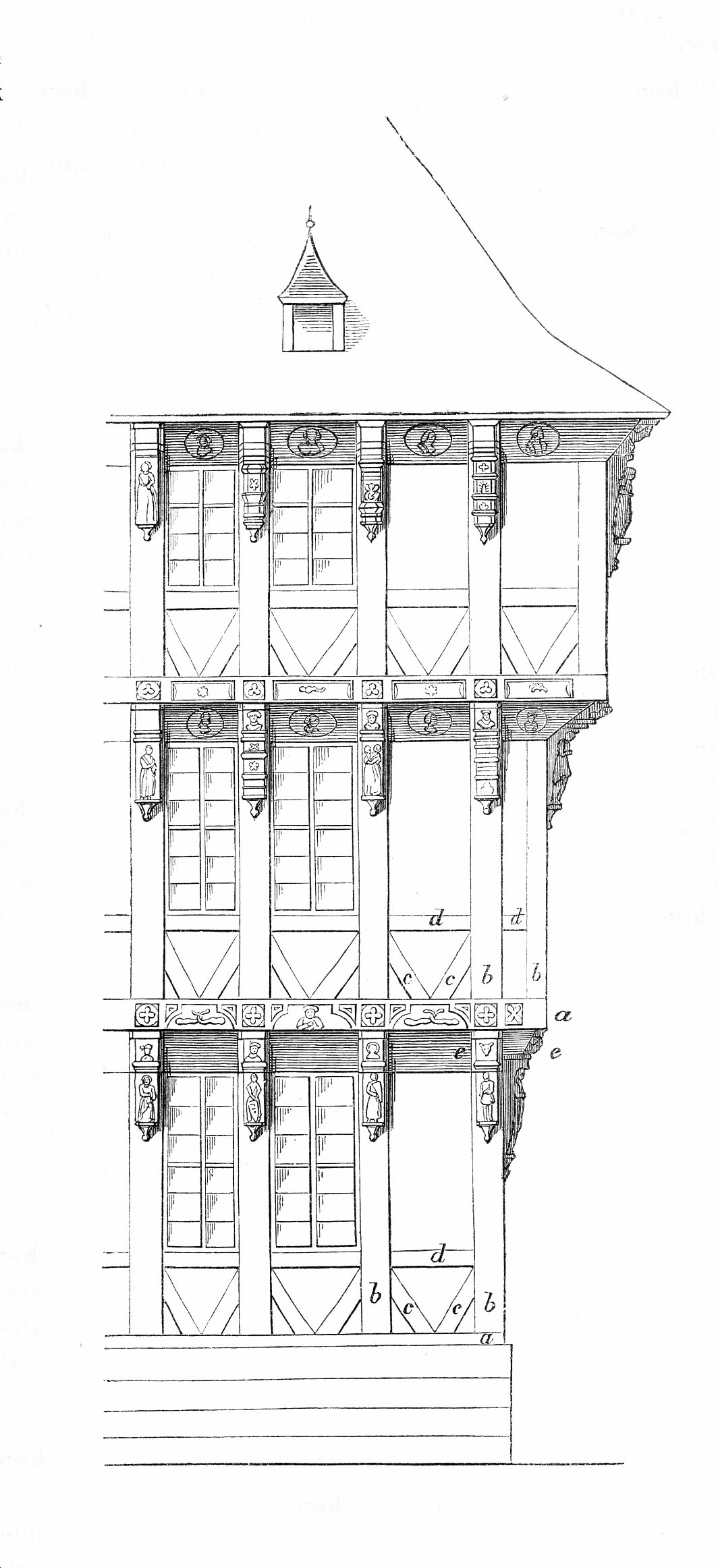
Urban dwelling house, late 15th century, Halberstadt, Germany

A precursor to Renaissance art can be seen already in the early 14th-century works of Giotto. Giotto was the first painter since antiquity to attempt the representation of three-dimensional reality and endow his characters with true human emotions. The most important developments, however, came in 15th-century Florence. The affluence of the merchant class allowed extensive patronage of the arts, and foremost among the patrons were the Medici.

The period saw several important technical innovations, like the principle of linear perspective found in the work of Masaccio and later described by Brunelleschi. Greater realism was also achieved through the scientific study of anatomy, championed by artists like Donatello. This can be seen particularly well in his sculptures, inspired by the study of classical models. As the centre of the movement shifted to Rome, the period culminated in the High Renaissance masters da Vinci, Michelangelo, and Raphael.

The ideas of the Italian Renaissance were slow to cross the Alps into northern Europe, but important artistic innovations were made also in the Low Countries. Though not – as previously believed – the inventor of oil painting, Jan van Eyck was a champion of the new medium and used it to create works of great realism and minute detail. The two cultures influenced each other and learned from each other, but painting in the Netherlands remained more focused on textures and surfaces than the idealized compositions of Italy.

In northern European countries, Gothic architecture remained the norm, and the Gothic cathedral was further elaborated. In Italy, on the other hand, architecture took a different direction, also here inspired by classical ideals. The crowning work of the period was the Santa Maria del Fiore in Florence, with Giotto's clock tower, Ghiberti's baptistery gates, and Brunelleschi's cathedral dome of unprecedented proportions.

=== Literature ===
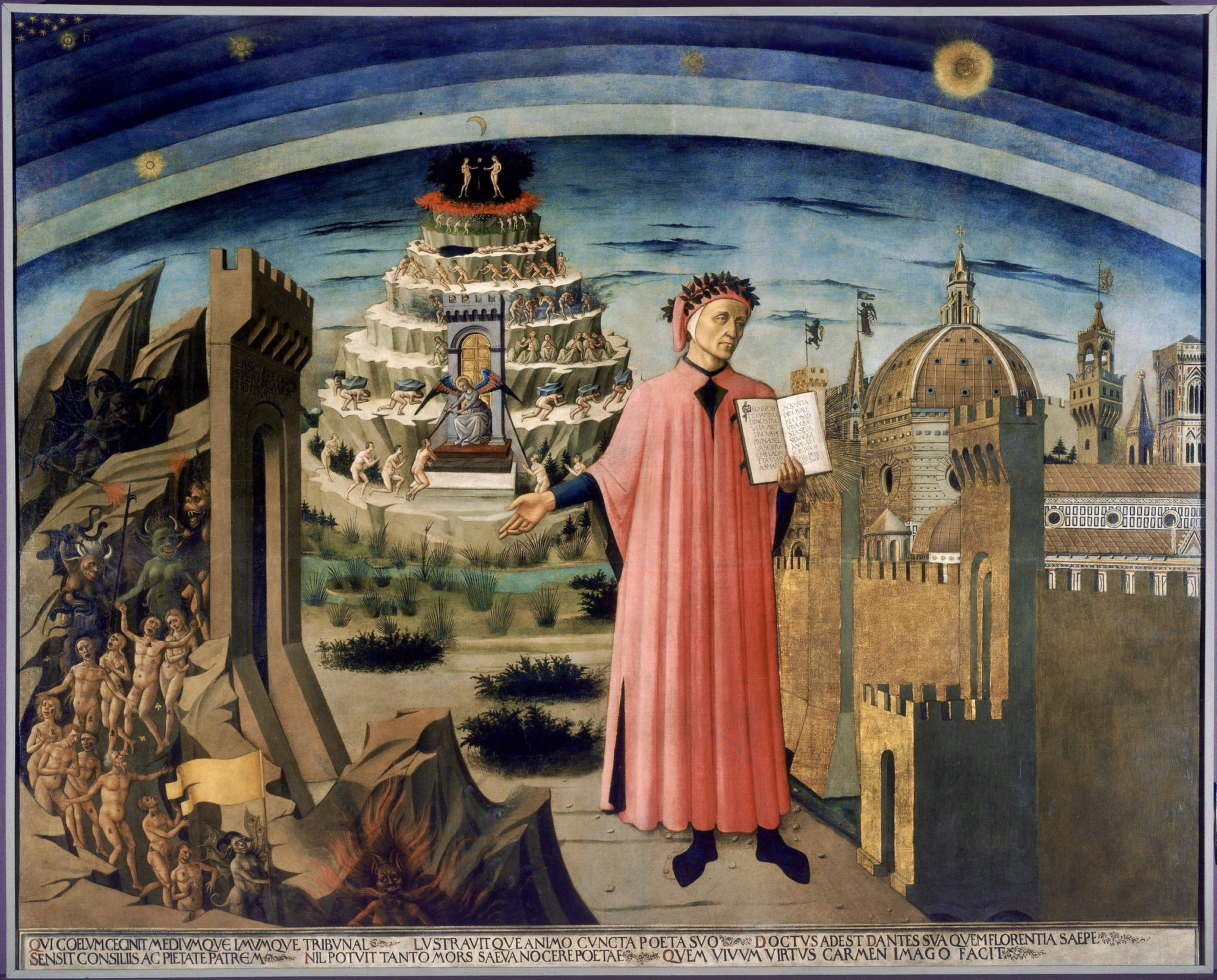
Dante as portrayed by Domenico di Michelino, from a fresco painted in 1465

The most important development of late medieval literature was the ascendancy of the vernacular languages. The vernacular had been in use in England since the 8th century and France since the 11th century, where the most popular genres had been the chanson de geste, troubadour lyrics, and romantic epics, or the romance. Though Italy was later in evolving a native literature in the vernacular language, it was here that the most important developments of the period were to come.

Dante Alighieri's Divine Comedy, written in the early 14th century, merged a medieval worldview with classical ideals. Another promoter of the Italian language was Boccaccio with his Decameron. The application of the vernacular did not entail a rejection of Latin, and both Dante and Boccaccio wrote prolifically in Latin as well as Italian, as would Petrarch later (whose Canzoniere also promoted the vernacular and whose contents are considered the first modern lyric poems). Together, the three poets established the Tuscan dialect as the norm for the modern Italian language.

The new literary style spread rapidly and in France, influenced such writers as Eustache Deschamps and Guillaume de Machaut. In England, Geoffrey Chaucer helped establish Middle English as a literary language with his Canterbury Tales, which contained a wide variety of narrators and stories (including some translated from Boccaccio). The spread of vernacular literature eventually reached as far as Bohemia and the Baltic, Slavic, and Byzantine worlds.

=== Music ===
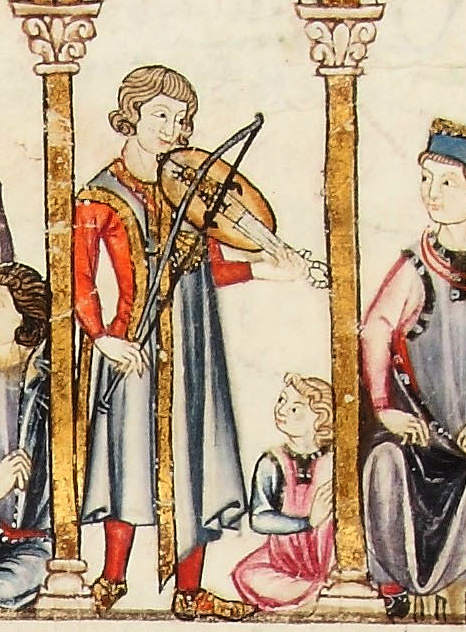
A musician plays the vielle in a 14th-century Medieval manuscript.

Music was an important part of both secular and spiritual culture, and in the universities, it made up part of the quadrivium of the liberal arts. From the early 13th century, the dominant sacred musical form had been the motet, a composition with text in several parts. From the 1330s and onwards emerged the polyphonic style, which was a more complex fusion of independent voices. Polyphony had been common in the secular music of the Provençal troubadours. Many of these had fallen victim to the 13th-century Albigensian Crusade, but their influence reached the papal court at Avignon.

The main representatives of the new style, often referred to as ars nova as opposed to ars antiqua, were the composers Philippe de Vitry and Guillaume de Machaut. In Italy, where the Provençal troubadours had also found refuge, the corresponding period goes under the name of trecento, and the leading composers were Giovanni da Cascia, Jacopo da Bologna, and Francesco Landini. A prominent reformer of Orthodox Church music from the first half of the 14th century was John Kukuzelis; he also introduced a system of notation widely used in the Balkans in the following centuries.

=== Theatre ===
In the British Isles, plays were produced in some 127 different towns during the Middle Ages. These vernacular Mystery plays were written in cycles of a large number of plays: York (48 plays), Chester (24), Wakefield (32), and Unknown (42). A larger number of plays survive from France and Germany in this period, and some type of religious drama was performed in nearly every European country in the late Middle Ages. Many of these plays contained comedy, devils, villains, and clowns.

Morality plays emerged as a distinct dramatic form around 1400 and flourished until 1550, an example being The Castle of Perseverance, which depicts mankind's progress from birth to death. Another famous morality play is Everyman. Everyman receives Death's summons, struggles to escape, and finally resigns himself to necessity. Along the way, he is deserted by Kindred, Goods, and Fellowship – only Good Deeds goes with him to the grave.

At the end of the late Middle Ages, professional actors began to appear in England and Europe. Richard III and Henry VII both maintained small companies of professional actors. Their plays were performed in the Great Hall of a nobleman's residence, often with a raised platform at one end for the audience and a "screen" at the other for the actors. Also important were Mummers' plays, performed during the Christmas season, and court masques. These masques were especially popular during the reign of Henry VIII who had a House of Revels built and an Office of Revels established in 1545.

The end of medieval drama came about due to a number of factors, including the weakening power of the Catholic Church, the Protestant Reformation, and the banning of religious plays in many countries. Elizabeth I forbid all religious plays in 1558, and the great cycle plays had been silenced by the 1580s. Similarly, religious plays were banned in the Netherlands in 1539, the Papal States in 1547, and Paris in 1548. The abandonment of these plays destroyed the international theatre that had thereto existed and forced each country to develop its own form of drama. It also allowed dramatists to turn to secular subjects and the reviving interest in Greek and Roman theatre provided them with the perfect opportunity.

=== After the Middle Ages ===
After the end of the late Middle Ages period, the Renaissance spread unevenly over continental Europe from the southern European region. The intellectual transformation of the Renaissance is viewed as a bridge between the Middle Ages and the Modern era. Europeans would later begin an era of world discovery. Combined with the influx of classical ideas was the invention of printing which facilitated dissemination of the printed word and democratized learning. These two things would lead to the Protestant Reformation. Europeans also discovered new trading routes, as was the case with Columbus' travel to the Americas in 1492, and Vasco da Gama's circumnavigation of Africa and India in 1498. Their discoveries strengthened the economy and power of European nations.

== Ottomans and Europe ==
Ottomans and Europe

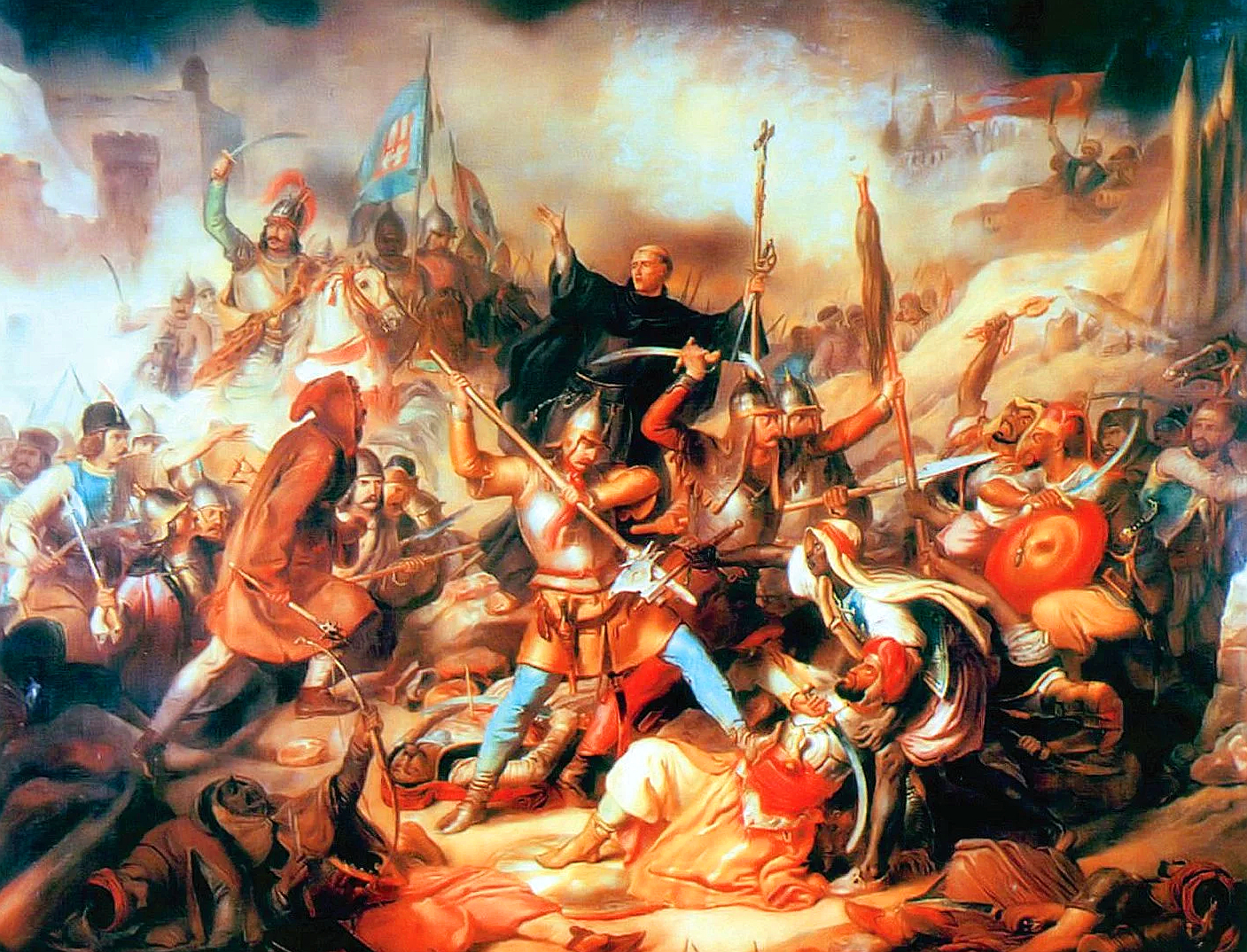
Saint John of Capistrano and the Hungarian armies fighting the Ottoman Empire at the siege of Belgrade in 1456

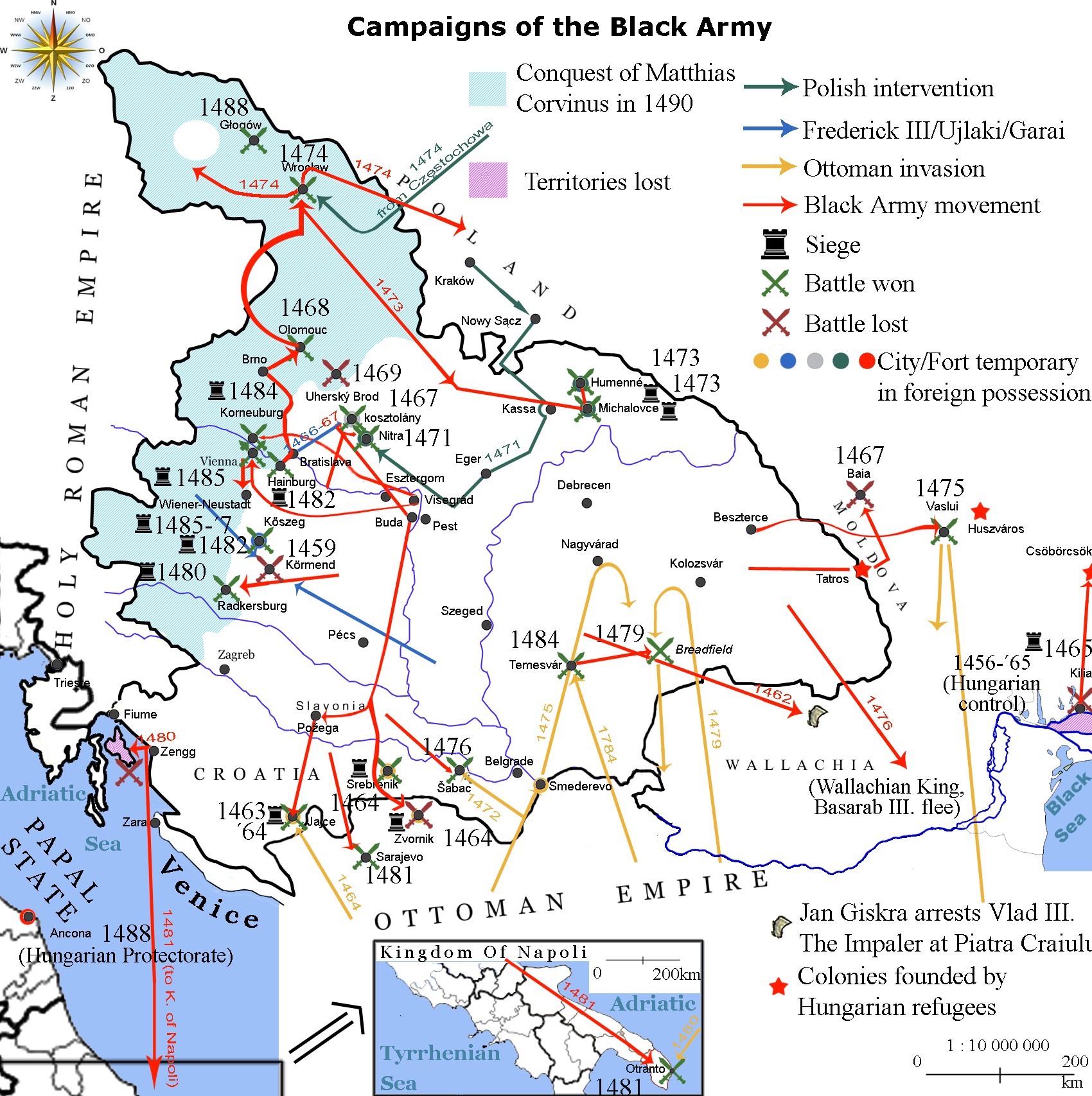
King Matthias Corvinus's Black Army campaigns

By the end of the 15th century, the Ottoman Empire had advanced all over Southeast Europe, eventually conquering the Byzantine Empire and extending control over the Balkan states. Hungary was the last bastion of the Latin Christian world in the East, and fought to keep its rule over a period of two centuries. After the death of the young king Vladislaus I of Hungary during the Battle of Varna in 1444 against the Ottomans, the Kingdom was placed in the hands of Count John Hunyadi, who became Hungary's regent-governor (1446–1453). Hunyadi was considered one of the most relevant military figures of the 15th century: Pope Pius II awarded him the title of Athleta Christi, or Champion of Christ, for being the only hope of resisting the Ottomans from advancing to Central and Western Europe.

Hunyadi succeeded during the siege of Belgrade in 1456 against the Ottomans, the biggest victory against that empire in decades. This battle became a real crusade against the Muslims, as the peasants were motivated by the Franciscan friar Saint John of Capistrano, who came from Italy predicating him holy war. The effect that it created in that time was one of the main factors that helped in achieving the victory. However the premature death of the Hungarian lord left Pannonia defenseless and in chaos. In an extremely unusual event for the Middle Ages, Hunyadi's son, Matthias, was elected as king of Hungary by the Hungarian nobility. For the first time, a member of an aristocratic family (and not from a royal family) was crowned.

King Matthias Corvinus of Hungary (1458–1490) was one of the most prominent figures of the period, directing campaigns to the West, conquering Bohemia in answer to the pope's call for help against the Hussite Protestants. Also, in resolving political hostilities with the German emperor Frederick III of Habsburg, he invaded his western domains. Matthew organized the Black Army of mercenary soldiers; it was considered as the biggest army of its time. Using this powerful tool, the Hungarian king led wars against the Turkish armies and stopped the Ottomans during his reign. After the death of Matthew, and with end of the Black Army, the Ottoman Empire grew in strength and Central Europe was defenseless. At the Battle of Mohács, the forces of the Ottoman Empire annihilated the Hungarian army and Louis II of Hungary drowned in the Csele Creek while trying to escape. The leader of the Hungarian army, Pál Tomori, also died in the battle. This is considered to be one of the final battles of medieval times.

== Timeline ==
Dates are approximate, consult particular articles for details Middle Ages themes Other themes

14th century

- 1305: William Wallace was executed
- 1307: The Knights Templar were destroyed
- 1309: Beginning of Avignon papacy
- 1310: Dante began the Divine Comedy
- 1314: Battle of Bannockburn
- 1315–1317 Great Famine
- 1321–1328 Byzantine civil war
- 1328: First War of Scottish Independence ends
- 1337: The Hundred Years' War begins
- 1346: Stephen Dušan established the short-lived Serbian Empire
- 1347: The Black Death begins
- 1347: University of Prague was founded
- 1348: Giovanni Villani finishes work on Nuova Cronica
- 1348–1349: Byzantine–Genoese War
- 1362: Battle of Blue Waters – the Grand Duchy of Lithuania defeated the Golden Horde and the Principality of Kiev becomes part of Lithuania
- 1364: Jagiellonian University was founded
- 1371: Battle of Maritsa — first substantial Ottoman victory in Europe; partition of Bulgaria
- 1376: Avignon Papacy ended
- 1380: Battle of Kulikovo
- 1380: The Canterbury Tales
- 1381: Peasants' Revolt in England
- 1381: John Wycliffe translated the Bible
- 1385: Union of Krewo, initiation of the Polish–Lithuanian union
- 1385: Battle of Aljubarrota
- 1386: University of Heidelberg was founded
- 1389: Battle of Kosovo — Serbian and Bosnian forces defeated by the Ottomans
- 1342–1392: Galicia–Volhynia Wars – partitioning of the Kingdom of Galicia–Volhynia between Poland and Lithuania
- 1396: Battle of Nicopolis and first Ottoman conquest in Europe
- 1397: Kalmar Union

15th century

- 1402: Battle of Ankara
- 1409: Venetian Dalmatia
- 1410: Battle of Grunwald
- 1415: Conquest of Ceuta
- 1415: Battle of Agincourt
- 1415: Jan Hus was burned at the stake
- 1417: The Council of Constance
- 1419–1434: Hussite Wars in Bohemia
- 1428–1429: Siege of Orléans
- 1431: Joan of Arc was burned at the stake
- 1434: The Medici family in Florence
- 1439: Johannes Gutenberg first used movable type printing in Europe
- 1444: Battle of Varna
- 1445: Battle of Suzdal
- 1453: Constantinople falls to Ottoman conquest
- 1455: Gutenberg Bible printed in Mainz
- 1456: Siege of Belgrade
- 1461: The Empire of Trebizond fell to the Turks
- 1469: Catholic Monarchs
- 1470: Battle of Lipnic
- 1474–1477: Burgundian Wars
- 1478: The Grand Principality of Moscow annexed the Novgorod Republic
- 1478: The Catholic Monarchs established the Spanish Inquisition
- 1479: Battle of Breadfield
- 1480: Great Stand on the Ugra River – end of the Tatar-Mongol yoke over the Russian principalities.
- 1485: Thomas Malory (Le Morte d'Arthur)
- 1492: Alhambra Decree
- 1492: Reconquista ended with the fall of Granada
- 1492: Christopher Columbus reached the "New World"
- 1494: Treaty of Tordesillas
- 1496: Nicolaus Copernicus matriculates at the University of Bologna
- 1497–1498: Portuguese explorer Vasco da Gama's first voyage reached India after circumnavigating Africa
- 1499: Battle of Zonchio

== Gallery ==
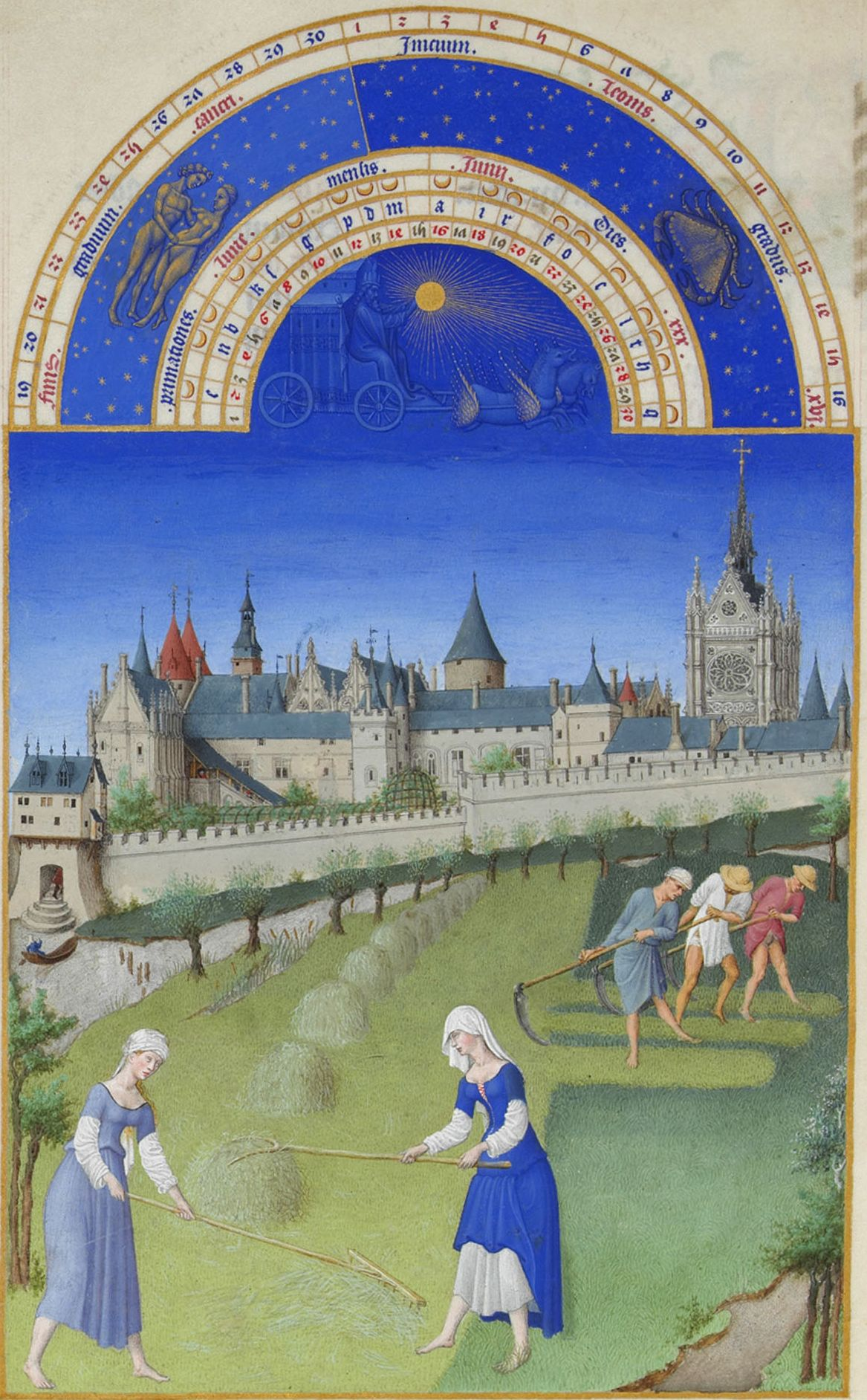
Peasants in fields
Très Riches Heures

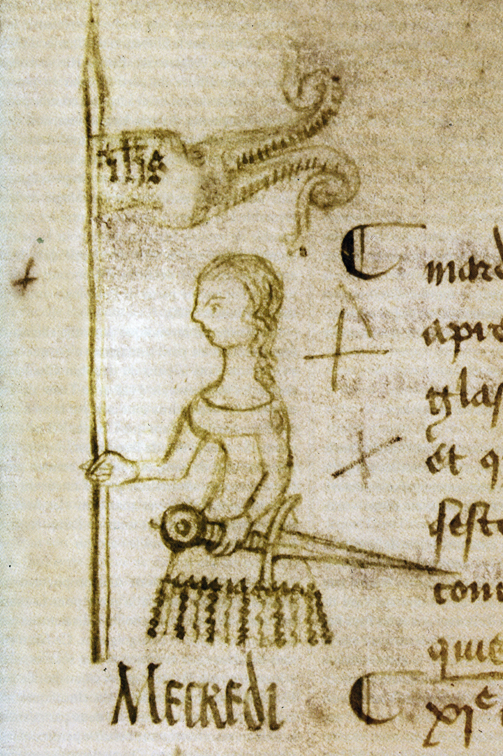
Joan of Arc
(Hundred Years' War)

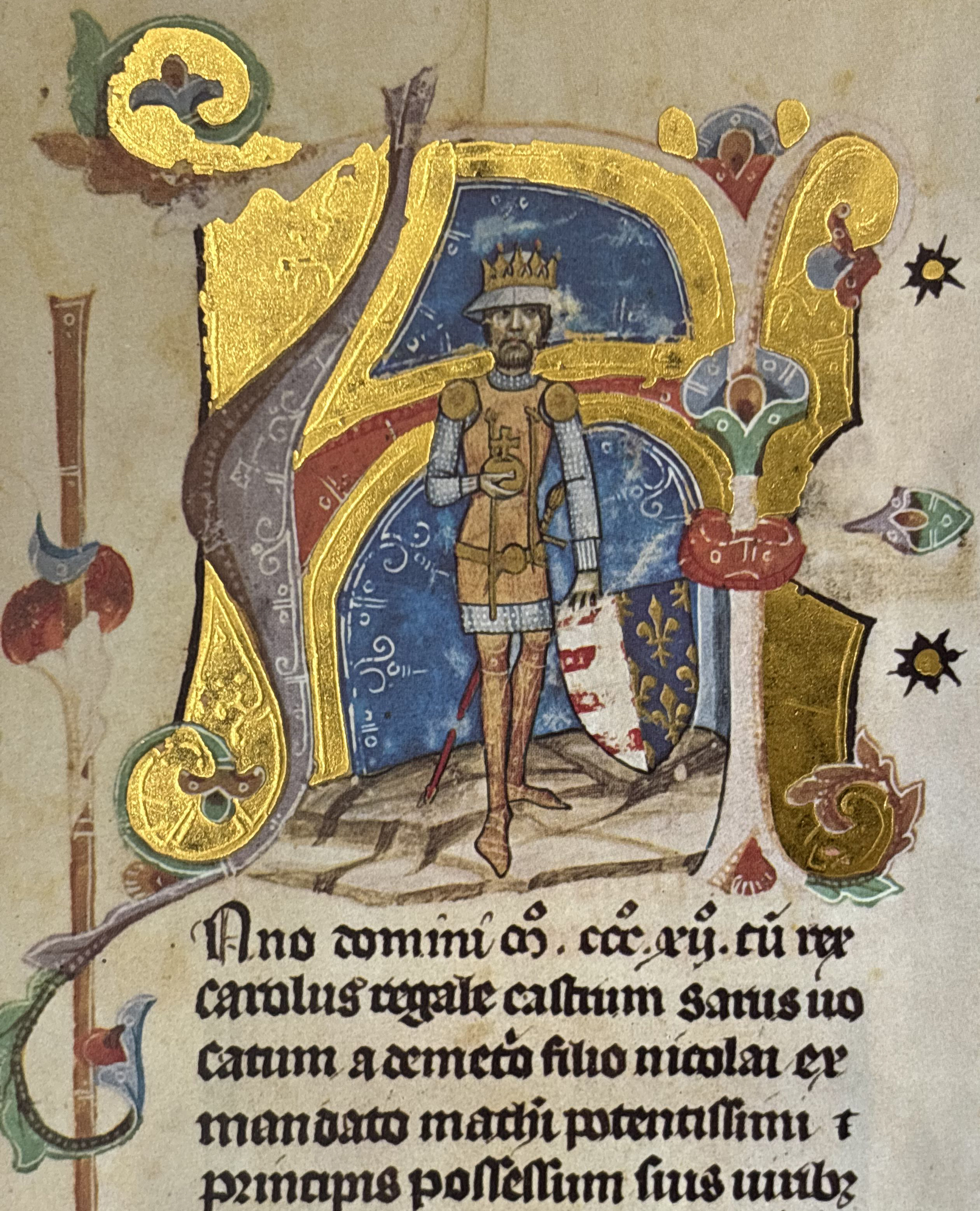
Charles I

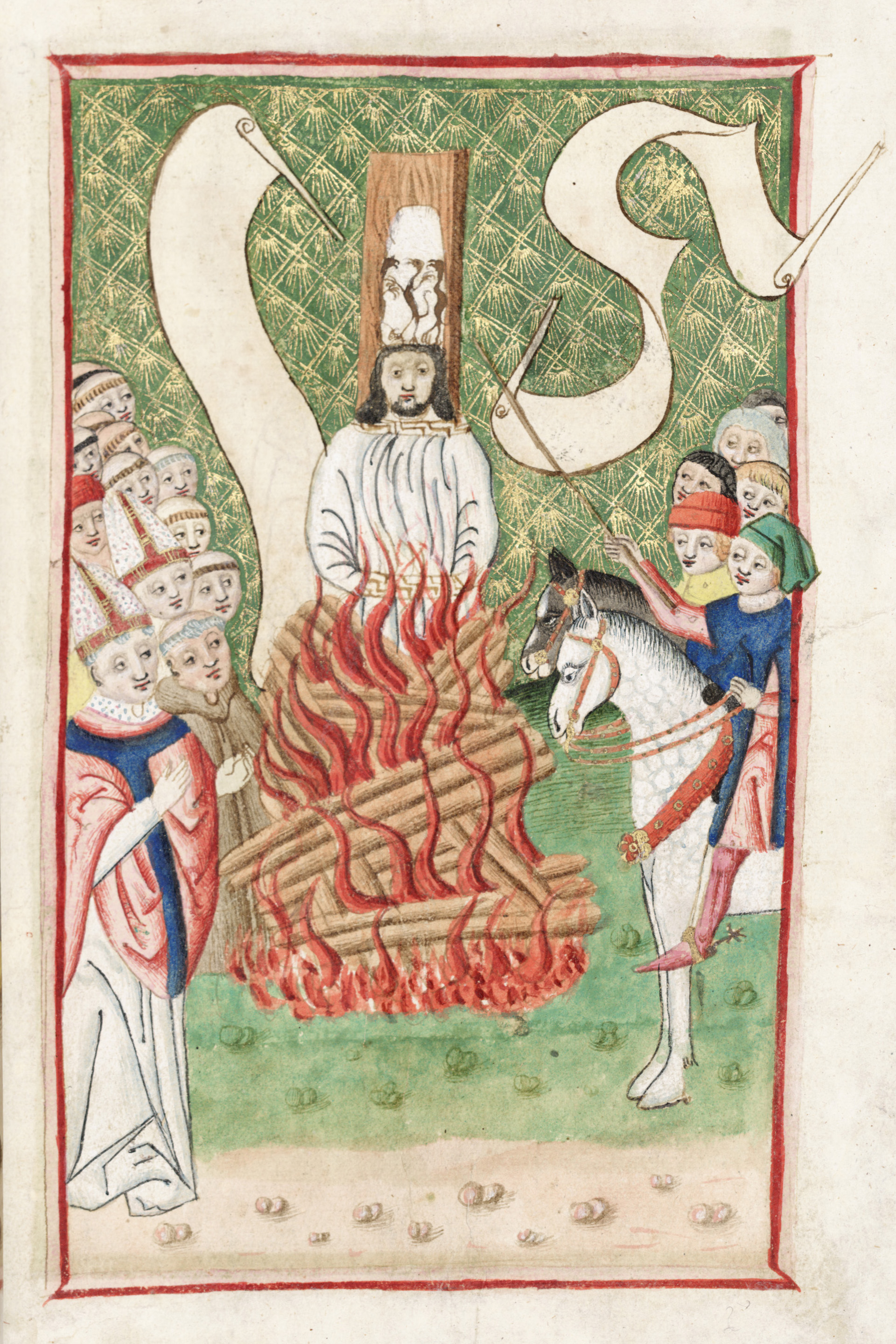
Jan Hus
(Bohemian Reformation)

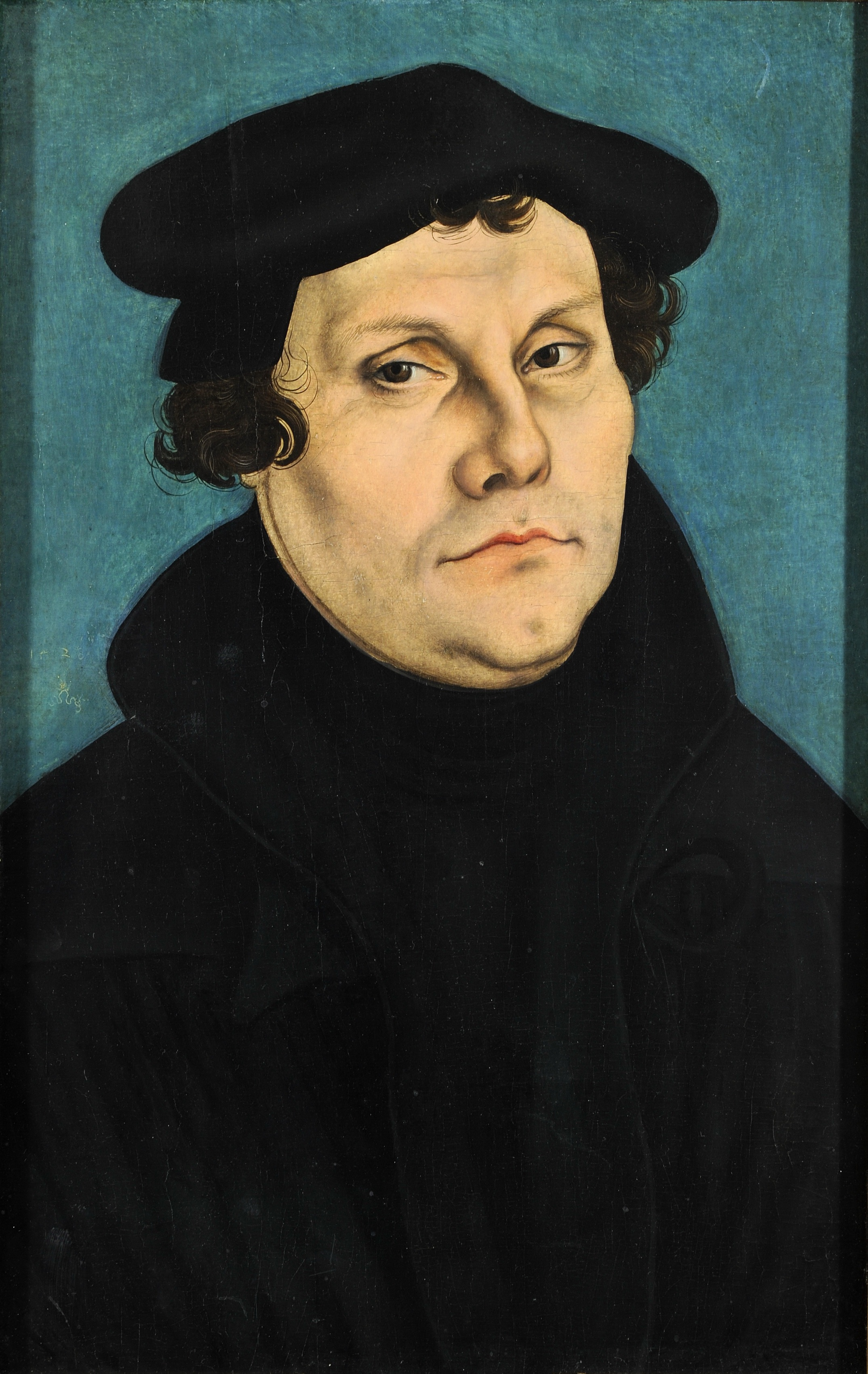
Martin Luther
(Protestantism)

== See also ==
- List of basic medieval history topics
- Timeline of the Middle Ages
- Church and state in medieval Europe
- Jews in the Middle Ages
- Gothic book illustration
