= Society of Scotland in the High Middle Ages =

Scottish Society in the High Middle Ages pertains to Scottish society roughly between 900 and 1286, a period roughly corresponding to the general historical era known as the High Middle Ages.

== Stratification ==
High Medieval Scottish society was stratified. More is known about status in early Gaelic society than perhaps any other early medieval European society, owing primarily to the large body of legal texts and tracts on status which are extant. These texts give additional understanding on high medieval Scottish society, so long as inferences are kept conservative. The legal tract that has come down to us as the Laws of Brets and Scots, lists five grades of man: King, mormaer/earl, toísech/thane, ócthigern and serf. For pre-twelfth century Scotland, slaves are added to this category. The standard differentiation in medieval European society between the bellatores ("those who fight", i.e. aristocrats), the oratores ("those who pray", i.e. clergy) and the laboratores ("those who work", i.e. peasants) was useless for understanding Scottish society in the earlier period, but becomes more useful in the post-Davidian period.

Early Gaelic Society
- Nemed (sacred person, highest rank )
  - Ard rí (High King)
  - Rí ruirech (King of overkings)
  - Ruiri (Overking)
  - Rí Túaithe (Local king)
  - Flaithe (Lord, prince)
- Nemed non-rulers
  - Ollam (master of some knowledge or skill)
  - Fili (poets)
  - Clerics
- Dóernemed (lit. Base-Nemed)
  - Brithem, tradesmen, harpists, etc.
- Freeman
  - Bóaire (Cattle lord)
  - Ócaire (Little Lord)
  - Fer midboth (semi-independent youth)
  - Fuidir (semi-freeman)
- Unfree
  - Bothach (serf)
  - Senchléithe (hereditary serf)
  - Mug (slave)

== King and court ==
The structure of the Scottish royal court in the period before the coming of the Normans to Scotland, before the reign of David I, is unknown. A little more is known about the court of the later twelfth and thirteenth centuries. In the words of Geoffrey Barrow, this court "was emphatically feudal, Frankish, non-Celtic in character". Some of the offices were Gaelic in origin, such as the hostarius, the man in charge of the royal bodyguard, and the rannaire, the Gaelic-speaking member of the court whose job was to divide the food.

- Seneschal or dapifer (i.e. the Steward), had been hereditary since the reign of David I. The Steward had responsibility for the royal household and its management.
- The Chancellor was in charge of the royal chapel. The latter was the king's place of worship, but as it happened, was associated with the royal scribes, responsible for keeping records. Usually, the chancellor was a clergyman, and usually he held this office before being promoted to a bishopric.
- The Chamberlain had control and responsibility over royal finances
- The Constable, likewise, hereditary since the reign of David I. The constable was in charge of the crown's military resources.
- The Butler
- The Marshal or marischal. The marischal differed from the constable in that he was more specialized, responsible for and in charge of the royal cavalry forces.

In the thirteenth century, all the other offices tended to be hereditary, with the exception of the Chancellor. The royal household of course came with numerous other offices. The most important was probably the hostarius, usher or durward (also Doorward), but there were others such as the royal hunters, the royal foresters and the cooks (dispensa or spence).

== Mormaers and Earls ==
Most of the territory subject to the King of Scots north of the Forth was directly under a lord who in medieval Scottish was called a Mormaer. The term was translated into Latin as comes, and is misleadingly translated into modern English as Earl. These secular lords exercised secular power and religious patronage like kings in miniature. They kept their own warbands and followers, issued charters and supervised law and internal order within their provinces. When actually under the power of the Scottish king, they were responsible for rendering to the king cain, a tribute paid several times a year, usually in cattle and other barter goods. They also had to provide for the king conveth, a kind of hospitality payment, paid by putting-up the lord on a visit with food and accommodation, or with barter payments in lieu of this. In the Norman era, when called upon to do so, they provided the servitum Scoticanum ("Gaelic service", "Scottish service" or simply forinsec) and led the exercitus Scoticanus , the Gaelic part of the king's army that made up the vast majority almost any national hosting (slógad) in the period.

== Toísechs and Thanes ==
A toísech ("chieftain") was like a mormaer, providing for his lord the same services that a mormaer provided for the king. A toísech was normally a hereditary tenant of either a King (on royal demesne), a mormaer (on comital demesne), an abbot or a bishop. The Latin word usually used is thanus, which is why the office-bearers are often called "thanes" in English. Although toísech, as the older word, was broader in meaning than thanus, many scholars spend a great deal of time arguing over when the office of thanus was introduced, when it is perhaps more reasonable to regard this institution, like other institutions, as formalisations and incorporations of pre-existing social structures by the Scottish rulers. However, it was perhaps in the tenth century that this particular institution acquired its Latin name, borrowed from Anglo-Saxon England. The formalization of this institution was largely confined to eastern Scotland north of the forth. Seventy-one thanages are on record from the Middle Ages, sixty-nine of which are in the eastern part of Scotland-proper, and two in Lothian.

== Kinship Groups ==
Behind the offices of toísech and mormaer were kinship groups. Sometimes these offices were formalized, but mostly they are informal. The head of the kinship group was called capitalis in Latin and cenn in medieval Gaelic. In the Mormaerdom of Fife, the primary kinship group was known then as Clann MacDuib ("Children of MacDuff"). The head of the group seems to have borne the right to use the title MacDuib, which is why some of the heads of the Fife kin-group are known only by that name. Similarly, the Lords of the Isles could and would call themselves simply MacDomhnaill. In Fife, the Mormaer was usually the head of Clann MacDuib, but not always. After the introduction of primogeniture, many mormaers succeed as minors; invariably though in this scenario, the leadership of the kin-group did not fall to a minor, but to another senior figure. Other kin-groups which are famous from medieval Scotland are Cennedig (from Carrick) and Morggain (from Buchan).

== Lower freemen and serfs ==
The highest non-noble rank was, according to the Laws of Brets and Scots, called the ócthigern (literally, little or young lord), a term the text does not bother to translate into French. Although the exact status of these men in uncertain, it seems likely that this would refer to the freeman equivalent of the early Gaelic Bóaire (i.e. "Cattle lord") or Ócaire. The Anglo-Saxon equivalent was perhaps the sokeman. The highest rank of the serf on monastic estates, and beyond, was called a scoloc. The latter term literally meant scholar, and was derived from the usage of the term for the lowest rank of pupil in a monastic school. The Anglo-Saxon equivalent was probably the gerseman. In the earlier period, the Scots kept slaves, and many of these were foreigners (English or Scandinavian) captured during warfare. Large-scale Scottish slave-raids are particularly well documented in the eleventh century.

== Notes ==
1. , Grant, "Thanes and Thanages", (1993), p. 42
2. , Kelly, Early Irish Law.
3. , Barrow, Robert Bruce, (1998), p. 7.
4. , Barrow, Kingship and Unity, p. 34.
5. , Grant, "Thanes and Thanages", pp. 43–44.
6. Barrow, Kingship and Unity, pp. 16–17.
