= Culture of Scotland in the High Middle Ages =

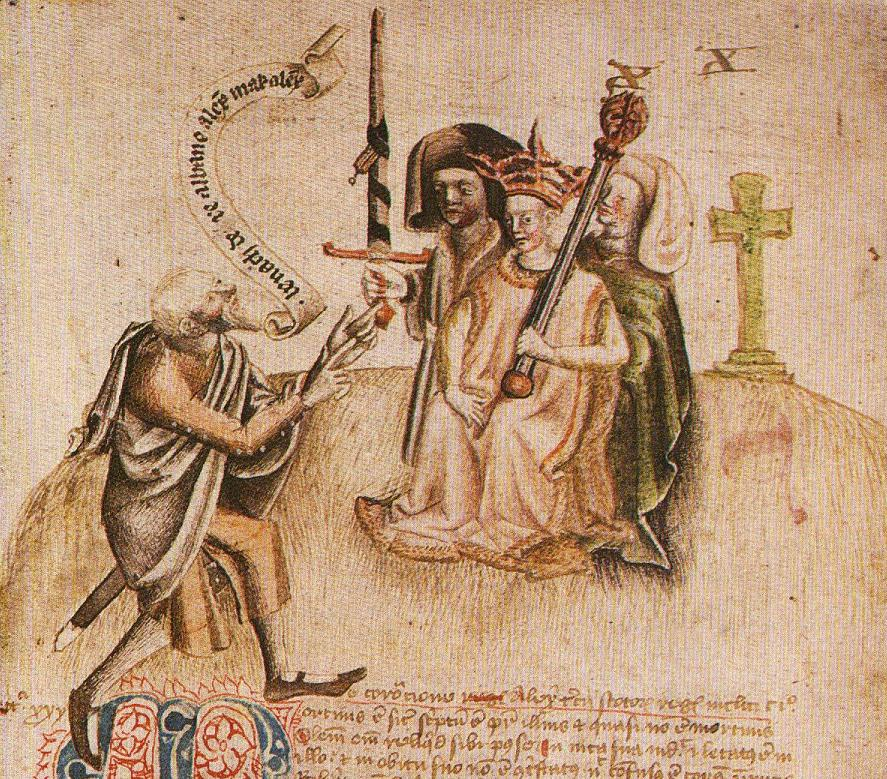
Coronation of King Alexander III on Moot Hill, Scone. He is being greeted by the ollamh rígh, the royal poet, who is addressing him with the proclamation "Benach De Re Albanne" (= Beannachd Dé Rígh Alban, "God Bless the King of Scotland"); the poet goes on to recite Alexander's genealogy.

Culture of Scotland in the High Middle Ages encompasses the various forms of cultural expression that originated from Scotland during the High Medieval period. For the purposes of this article, this period is defined as spanning from the death of Domnall II in 900 to the death of Alexander III in 1286. The unity of this period is highlighted by significant breaks in Scottish history due to events such as the Wars of Scottish Independence, the Stewart accession, and subsequent transformations in Scottish society during the fourteenth century and beyond. One distinguishing feature of this period is the predominance of Gaelic culture, which later evolved into a Scoto-Norman French culture during the later medieval period.

== Oral culture ==
As a predominantly Gaelic society, most Scottish cultural practices throughout this period mirrored closely those of Ireland, or at least those of Ireland with some Pictish borrowings. After David I, the French-speaking kings introduced cultural practices popular in Anglo-Norman England, France and elsewhere. As in all pre-modern societies, storytelling was popular. In the words of D.D.R. Owen, a scholar who specialises in the literature of the era:

"Professional storytellers would ply their trade from court to court. Some of them would have been native Scots, no doubt offering legends from the ancient Celtic past performed ... in Gaelic when appropriate, but in French for most of the new nobility"

Almost all of these stories are lost, or come down only vaguely in Gaelic or Scots oral tradition.

== Genealogies ==
One form of culture extremely well accounted for in this period is genealogy. There are dozens of Scottish genealogies surviving from this era, covering everyone from the Mormaers of Lennox and Moray, to the Scottish king himself. In the Poppleton Manuscript, there is a full genealogy of King William I going all the way back to Adam, via Gaidheal Glas. The latter genealogy is just a recording or partial translation of a Gaelic genealogy, where mac ("son") and meic ("sons", or "of the son") have been replaced with filius and filii; moreover, before his grandfather David I, virtually all William's ancestors have their names in the Middle Irish genitive form (with filii preceding). Furthermore, until at least the reign of Alexander III, Scotland's kings maintained an ollamh righe, a royal high poet who had a permanent place in all medieval Gaelic lordships, and whose purpose was to recite genealogies when needed, for occasions such as coronations. The Lord Lyon can be seen as a later development of this role.

== Literacy ==
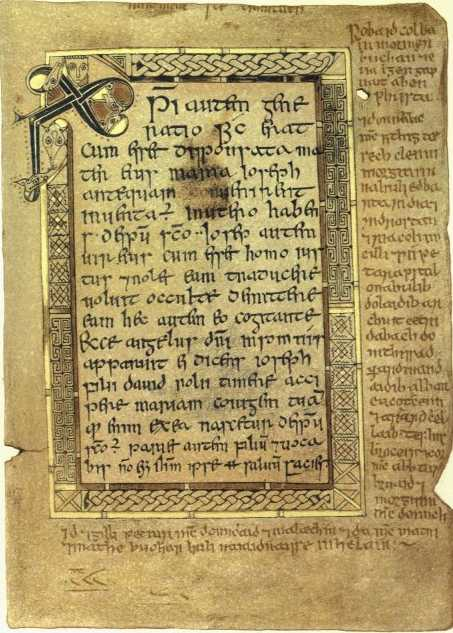
Book of Deer, Folio 5r contains the text of the Gospel of Matthew from 1:18 through 1:21. Note the Chi Rho monogram in the upper left corner. The margins contain Gaelic text.

After David I, the influx of English and French clerics introduced a break with this traditional culture everywhere they went. Even though, as Dauvit Broun shows, a Gaelic literary elite survived in the eastern Scottish lowlands, in places such as Loch Leven and Brechin into the thirteenth century, it was not the flourishing one that contemporary Ireland possessed, at least not in its written literary output. Latin scribes, even if they knew Gaelic, would normally avoid the Gaelic vernacular and, as elsewhere in Europe, would translate vernacular terms into Latin, so that historians are faced with a Gaelic society clothed in Latin terminology. Even names were translated into more common continental forms; for instance, Gille Brigte became Gilbert, Áed became Hugh, etc.

== Literature ==
Thomas Owen Clancy has recently all but proven that the Lebor Bretnach, the so-called "Irish Nennius," was written in Scotland, and probably at the monastery in Abernethy. Yet this text survives only from manuscripts preserved in Ireland. In fact, almost all pre-fourteenth century literature than can be attributed to Scotland, survives only from Ireland, England or continental Europe.

There survives a small body of medieval Scottish poetry. There seems to have been some patronage of Gaelic poetry by the later Pictish kings. In the thirteenth century, Muireadhach Albanach, Irish poet of the O'Dálaigh clan of poets wrote eulogies for the Mormaers of Lennox. He founded the MacMhuirich bardic family, a Scottish dynasty of poets. Muireadhach may have played a large role introducing the new "reformed" style of poetry which had been developing in Ireland in the twelfth century. Muireadhach's friend, Gille Brighde Albanach, was perhaps the most prolifically extant native Scottish poet. About 1218, Gille Brighde wrote a poem - Heading for Damietta - on his experiences of the Fifth Crusade.

In the thirteenth century, French flourished as a literary language, and produced the Roman de Fergus, the earliest piece of non-Celtic vernacular literature to survive from Scotland. Moreover, many other stories in the Arthurian Cycle, written in French and preserved only outside Scotland, are thought by some scholars (D.D.R. Owen for instance) to have been written in Scotland.

Latin too was a literary language. Famous examples would be the Inchcolm Antiphoner, a Lament for Alan, Lord of Galloway and the Carmen de morte Sumerledi ("Song on the Death of Somerled"), a poem which exults triumphantly the victory of the citizens of Glasgow over Somailre mac Gilla Brigte. Additionally, almost all historical writing from this period was also written in Latin.

There is no extant literature in the English language in this era, although that language would experience a literary take-off in the century after this period. There is a little Norse literature from Scandinavian parts, such as the Northern Isles and the Western Isles. The famous Orkneyinga Saga however, although it pertains to the Earldom of Orkney, was written in Iceland. The Western Isles would be integrated into Scotland during this period, but the Northern Isles were ruled from Norway until the late 15th century.

== Music ==
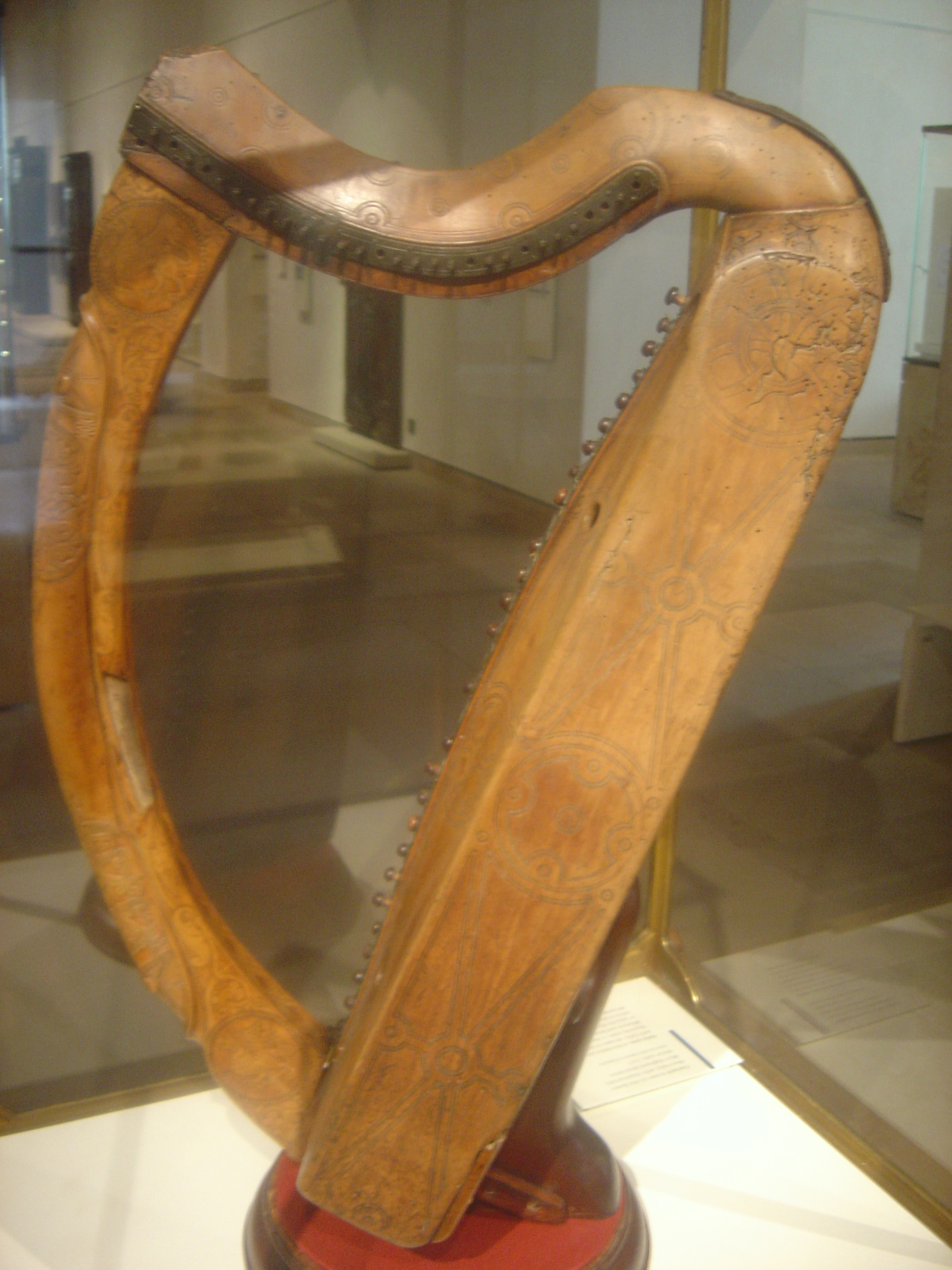
The harp (or clarsach) was an instrument associated with medieval Scottish culture. This one, now in the Museum of Scotland, is one of only three surviving medieval Gaelic harps.

The medieval Scots indeed took harping very seriously. We know that, even half a century after Gerald was writing, King Alexander III kept a royal harpist. Of the three medieval harps that survive, two come from Scotland (Perthshire), and one from Ireland. Singers also had a royal function. For instance, when the king of Scotland past through the territory of Strathearn, it was the custom that he be greeted by seven female singers, who would sing to him. When Edward I approached the borders of Strathearn in the summer of 1296, he was met by these seven women, "who accompanied the King on the road between Gask and Ogilvie, singing to him, as was the custom in the time of the late Alexander kings of Scots".

== Notes ==
1. , Owen, William the Lion, (1997), p. 21.
2. , Bannerman, “The Kings Poet”, (1989).
3. , Broun “Gaelic Literacy", (1998), pp. 183–201.
4. , Broun, Dauvit, The Charters, (1995).
5. , Clancy, "Nennian recension", (2000), pp. 87–107.
6. , For the works of (Muireadhach Albanach and) Gille Brighde Albanach, see Clancy (ed.), Triumph Tree,ibid. pp. 247–83.
7. , Gerald of Wales, Topographia Hibernica, 94.
8. , Calendar of documents relating to Scotland preserved in Her Majesty's Public Record Office, ed. J. Bain (4 vols, Edinburgh, 1881), vol. iv, p. 475; in Neville, Native Lordship, p. 79; and Barrow, Robert Bruce, p. 5.
