= Central Park Casino =

Restaurant and nightclub in New York City

Coordinates: 40°46′22″N 73°58′11″W

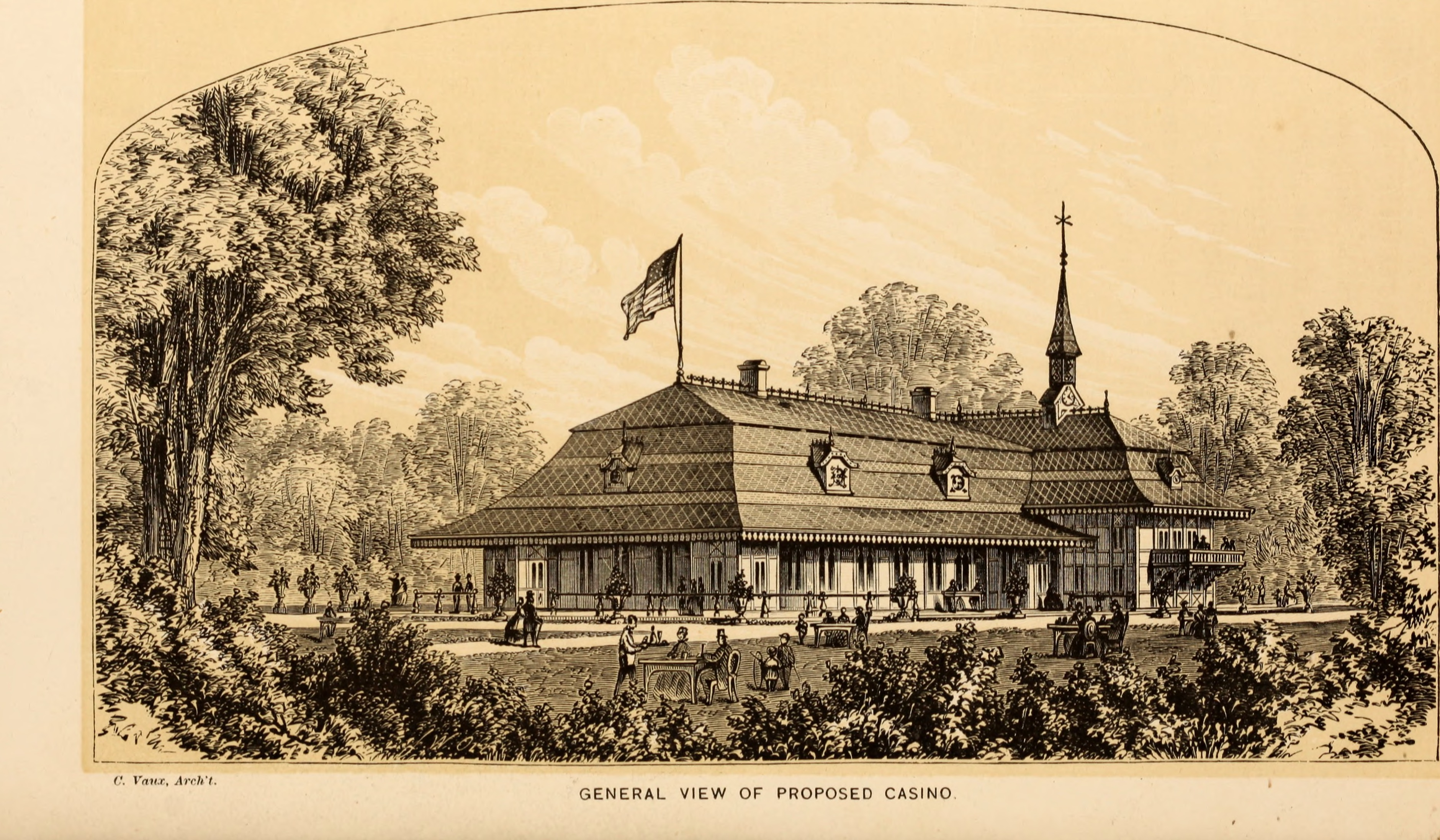
- Interactive map of the Central Park Casino area

General information
- Location: Manhattan, New York City
- Opened: 1862
- Relocated: 1929
- Demolished: 1936

Design and construction
- Architect: Calvert Vaux

Notable buildings and structures of Central Park. Click on the map and then on the points for details.

The Central Park Casino, originally the Ladies' Refreshment Salon, was a restaurant in Central Park, near East 72nd Street in Manhattan, New York City. The name of the building came from the Italian for "little house"; the Casino itself was not a gambling business.

== Operation ==
The building was originally designed by Calvert Vaux in 1862 as part of the Greensward Plan for Central Park. Initial plans called for a chalet-styled wooden structure with a low, broad hip roof. Before construction began, however, Vaux decided that a more permanent building was needed. The following year, with the assistance of Edward C. Miller and Jacob Wrey Mould, the Casino was redesigned as a Gothic Revival stone structure.

The building opened in early 1864 as a restaurant intended for unaccompanied female visitors to Central Park, and was one of Central Park's three original restaurants. Soon, it was patronized by both men and women. While the building that housed the Casino belonged to the City of New York, the City often leased the Casino to independent operators. By the early 1920s, the Casino was rundown, and so it was renovated during the winter of 1921–1922.

Jimmy Walker, mayor of New York City during the late 1920s, frequented the Casino and reportedly spent more time there than in New York City Hall. Besides entertaining elite guests in the restaurant, Walker had an office in the Casino and conducted city administration there while meeting with political cronies. In 1929 Walker terminated the lease of C.F. Zittel and allowed a friend, Sidney Solomon, to transform the Casino into one of New York's most expensive nightclubs. Plans for the renovated Casino were released in February 1929. Solomon renovated the interior of the Casino using a design from Viennese designer Joseph Urban, though he kept the exterior mostly the same. The renovated Casino reopened on June 4, 1929.

The Casino features in the 1933 travelogue film Mr. Broadway with Eddy Duchin and his band playing.

== Demolition ==
When the Great Depression hit four months after the Casino reopened, the nightclub faced increasing criticism for operating on city land while maintaining prices only the wealthiest New York residents could afford. In 1930, as part of an enforcement of Prohibition, the United States government raided the Casino and seized alcoholic beverages. Walker's successor Fiorello H. La Guardia and his parks commissioner Robert Moses, who held a vendetta against Walker, wanted to tear down the Casino with the intention of building a playground on the site. In 1934, Moses served an eviction order to the Casino's management. When the Parks Association of New York City objected to the proposed playground because it would take away from the park's rural character, Moses dismissed the opposition as "preposterous". The Casino was ultimately demolished in 1936.

Only the stained-glass windows of the Casino were preserved. They were installed in, and later removed from, the police station at the 86th Street transverse. The remaining fixtures were auctioned off for pennies on the dollar. The Rumsey Playfield was built on the site of the former restaurant. During the summer months, it is occupied by a temporary stage and bleachers for the annual SummerStage, and then returned to its playfield status each fall.

== Sources ==
- Caro, Robert (1974). The Power Broker: Robert Moses and the Fall of New York. New York: Knopf. ISBN 978-0-394-48076-3.
- Carroll, Raymond (May 1, 2008). The Complete Illustrated Map and Guidebook to Central Park. New York: Sterling Publishing Company, Inc. ISBN 9781402758331.
- Rosenzweig, Roy & Blackmar, Elizabeth (1992). The Park and the People: A History of Central Park. Cornell University Press. ISBN 0-8014-9751-5.
- "1863 Central Park Commissioners Annual Report" (PDF). New York City Department of Parks and Recreation. 1863. Archived from the original (PDF) on February 6, 2017.
- "1864 Central Park Commissioners Annual Report" (PDF). New York City Department of Parks and Recreation. 1864. Archived from the original (PDF) on February 11, 2017.
- Kowsky, Francis R. (1998). Country, Park, & City: The Architecture and Life of Calvert Vaux. Oxford University Press. ISBN 978-0-19-511495-9.
