= Center for Public History and Digital Humanities =

- Established: 2008
- Location: Cleveland, Oh
- Website: csudigitalhumanities.org

The Center for Public History and Digital Humanities is a digital humanities center in Cleveland, Ohio, based in the Department of History at Cleveland State University.

== History ==
Although some projects and collaborations date back to 2000, the Center was formally founded in 2008 by Dr. Mark Tebeau and Dr. Mark Souther as a vehicle for undertaking public history and digital history initiatives across numerous grants, under the Teaching American History (TAH) program, funded by the US Department of Education. The Center's primary focuses have been on developing the Curatescape mobile-based digital humanities framework, curating the Cleveland metropolitan area with the Cleveland Historical mobile app, and collecting oral history interviews that document the development of the region through personal, historical, institutional, and geographically based narratives. In addition to numerous historical, educational and professional development web resources, the Center's first large-scale project was the Euclid Corridor History Project. In 2013, Mark Souther became Director of the Center after Mark Tebeau left to become Director of Public History at Arizona State University.

== Euclid Corridor History Project ==
In 2005, the Greater Cleveland RTA began building a bus rapid transit line along Euclid Avenue from Public Square to University Circle and then to East Cleveland. Included in the project was funding for the integration of several public art components. In addition to art installations and other aesthetic improvements, more than a dozen interactive touchscreen kiosks were placed along the corridor. Each Euclid Corridor Virtual History Kiosk includes transit timetables and RTA news, as well as audiovisual exhibits focusing on the history of Euclid Avenue and the city of Cleveland. More than 60 historical sites, themes, and people are represented on the kiosks, which utilize oral history audio, historic and contemporary images, and brief historical essays to curate the city's history. The kiosks were created by the Center for Public History and Digital Humanities and were designed by Epstein Design Partners in Shaker Heights, Ohio. The Euclid Corridor History Project won the 2011 Public History Award from the Ohio Academy of History.

== Cleveland Historical and Curatescape ==
In 2010, the Center released Cleveland Historical, a website and mobile application for iOS and Android devices. Cleveland Historical garnered one of two Honorable Mentions for the 2011 Outstanding Public History Project Award from the National Council on Public History. Cleveland Historical is the first implementation of a larger mobile platform called Curatescape. Previously known as Mobile Historical, Curatescape is a location-based mobile app designed to "curate your landscape" through the use of geo-located interpretive texts, archival film and images, oral history (and other) audio, and short documentary videos. Curatescape's development was funded by Cleveland State University and the National Endowment for the Humanities (NEH) in 2011. As of October 2020, more than 30 universities, museums, preservation organizations, historical societies, and humanities councils deployed Curatescape apps. Additional projects run on the open-source web-only Curatescape framework. The Curatescape framework is built on Omeka, an open source archival Content Management System developed by the Center for History and New Media at George Mason University. In 2014, Center director Mark Souther and Cleveland State University colleague Meshack Owino obtained a National Endowment for the Humanities Digital Humanities Start-Up Grant for "Curating Kisumu: Adapting Mobile Humanities Interpretation in East Africa," an eighteen-month project that investigated optimizing Curatescape in the developing world. As part of this grant, the Center partnered with the Maseno University Department of History and Archaeology in Kisumu, Kenya. The initial project website, called MaCleKi, launched in September 2015, and the project white paper followed the close of the grant. The project continued under an NEH Digital Humanities Advancement Grant awarded in 2017, which resulted in the release of Curatescape for WordPress and additional content on MaCleKi.

== PlacePress ==
In 2020, the Center began developing PlacePress, a WordPress plugin for publishing location-based tours and stories with a National Endowment for the Humanities grant. The plugin features custom post types for locations and tours, a global map block, and maximum flexibility for administrative users. It is slated for completion in 2021.

== Oral history ==
To date, the Center has collected more than 1,160 oral history interviews, including Northeast Ohioans who range in notoriety from regular citizens to renowned artists, architects, and political figures. Over one-third of the collection comprises interviews conducted by community partners, including K-12 teachers. The remainder were conducted by Cleveland State University students, often in concert with community collaborations. Particular strengths within the collection include architecture, consumerism, environment, gardens, industry, leisure, music, neighborhoods, parks, politics, race and ethnicity, religion, social activism, suburbs, and urban planning. These interviews are made available online with a Creative Commons license from the Cleveland Regional Oral History Collection. In 2016, the Center developed an Omeka-based "discovery" site for the collection, Cleveland Voices.
