= ASHP =

ASHP may refer to:

- American Society of Health-System Pharmacists, a professional organization representing the interests of pharmacists.
- Air source heat pumps, a heating and cooling system.
- The American Social History Project, a research center based at the CUNY Graduate Center.
