= Inter-Disciplinary Programme in Educational Technology =

Interdisciplinary programme at IIT Bombay

- Established: 2010
- Convener (current): Prof. Sahana Murthy
- Location: Mumbai, Maharashtra, India
- Campus: Urban
- Website: www.et.iitb.ac.in

The Inter-Disciplinary Programme (IDP) in Educational Technology was established by the Government of India at the campus of Indian Institute of Technology Bombay in 2010. This is primarily a research group actively involved in research and education in the area of technologies to promote the learning-teaching process. It offers Ph.D and post graduate programmes.

== Introduction ==
The research focus of the IDP-ET are innovative pedagogies and instructional strategies, technology enhanced learning of thinking skills, and teacher use of educational technology, Tools and Strategies.

== See also ==
- Educational technology
- Higher-order thinking
- Historical thinking
- Divergent thinking
- Divergent thinking
- Design thinking
- Computational thinking
