= Blackmar =

Blackmar is a surname. Notable people with the surname include:

- Armand Blackmar (1826–1888), American music publisher
- Charles Blakey Blackmar (1922–2007), American judge
- Elizabeth Blackmar, American historian, author, and professor
- Esbon Blackmar (1805–1857), American politician
- Frank W. Blackmar (1854–1931), American sociologist, historian and educator
- Phil Blackmar (born 1957), American golfer
- Wilmon W. Blackmar (1841–1905), Union Army officer and Medal of Honor recipient
