= CEISMIC =

Canterbury Earthquakes Digital Archive

Coordinates: 43°31′24″S 172°34′55″E

The UC CEISMIC Canterbury Earthquakes Digital Archive programme was established in 2011 with the aim of preserving the knowledge, memories and earthquake experiences of people of the Canterbury region. The website provides federated access to a broad range of earthquake-related research material, gathered by leading New Zealand cultural and educational organisations.

== Description ==
UC CEISMIC is a project of the Digital Humanities department at the University of Canterbury, which focuses on principles of openness and collaboration.

The project was founded by University of Canterbury Professor Paul Millar following the 2011 Canterbury earthquakes. It was inspired by the September 11 Digital Archive project developed by the Roy Rosenzweig Center for History and New Media at George Mason University. The purpose is to preserve earthquake-related material for future generations, researchers, and other communities that experience disasters.

UC CEISMIC is a federated archive, providing public access to a wide range of earthquake-related content, including images, videos, interviews, stories and research material from many content partners. Metadata from each of the content partners is harvested by DigitalNZ and fed through to the federated search tool at ceismic.org.nz using DigitalNZ's API. Content providers include UC QuakeStudies, Kete Christchurch, Ross Becker & Moira Fraser and the Ministry for Culture and Heritage. The total number of items publicly available is over 55,000.

Lessons learned from the project are shared in chapter 10 of the book Crisis and Disaster in Japan and New Zealand: Actors, Victims and Ramifications.

== Consortium ==
The UC CEISMIC Consortium includes core content contributors, as well as providing members of the programme board. It exists to ensure the programme is sustainable and well managed, and that the digital repository meets international standards.

The Consortium is founded upon a Memorandum of Understanding that holds open access and collaboration as two of its key principles.

=== Consortium members ===
- University of Canterbury
- National Library of New Zealand
- Ministry for Culture and Heritage
- NZ On Screen
- Christchurch City Libraries
- Canterbury Earthquake Recovery Authority
- Canterbury Museum
- Te Papa
- Archives New Zealand
- Ngai Tahu Research Centre
- The New Zealand Film Archive

== UC QuakeStudies ==
UC QuakeStudies is the research component of UC CEISMIC, and one of several repositories that the CEISMIC search engine harvests material from. It is a secure, access-controlled repository, built and hosted at the University of Canterbury, with the purpose of preserving a digital record of the earthquakes and the rebuild, and to facilitate future research.

Earthquake-related content is sourced by the UC CEISMIC programme office from researchers, community groups, and other organisations and individuals. Content is then organised, described and stored in online collections. Qualitative metadata such as geo-locations, dates, file sizes, tags and categories is added where possible by the programme office team.

The QuakeStudies archive includes large content collections such as Fairfax Media, Environment Canterbury, Gap Filler, New Zealand Historic Places Trust, QuakeBox, urban regeneration projects and a digitised copy of The Pledge. It also holds content contributed by individuals and community groups, such as records of blog posts by members of the Christchurch Bloggers group and a variety of photographs and videos.
