= CHNM =

CHNM may refer to:

- CHNM-DT, a television station also known as OMNI British Columbia
- Center for History and New Media, a research center at George Mason University
