= Lee Shulman =

American educational psychologist (1938–2024)

Lee S. Shulman
- Born: September 28, 1938; Chicago, Illinois, U.S.
- Died: December 30, 2024 (aged 86)
- Spouse: Judy (Horwitz) Shulman
- Children: 3
- Awards: E. L. Thorndike Award (1995)

Academic background
- Education: The University of Chicago

Academic work
- Discipline: Education
- Institutions: Michigan State University Stanford Graduate School of Education Carnegie Foundation for the Advancement of Teaching
- Doctoral students: Sam Wineburg Suzanne Wilson Pam Grossman Bill Carlson Cathy Ringstaff

Lee S. Shulman (September 28, 1938 – December 30, 2024) was an American educational psychologist and reformer. He made notable contributions to the study of teaching; assessment of teaching; education in the fields of medicine, science, and mathematics; and the scholarship of teaching and learning.

== Background ==
Shulman was born on September 28, 1938, in Chicago, Illinois. He was the only son of Jewish immigrants who owned a small delicatessen on the Northwest Side of Chicago.

Shulman attended a yeshiva high school in Chicago. He completed his bachelors (1959), masters (1960), and PhD (1963) at the University of Chicago, where Joseph Schwab and Benjamin Bloom were among the faculty who influenced his thinking and research interests.

== Career ==
From 1963 to 1982, Shulman was a professor of educational psychology and medical education at Michigan State University, where he and Judith Lanier co-founded and co-directed the Institute for Research on Teaching. He then became a professor at the Stanford Graduate School of Education, where he held the Charles E. Ducommun chair until 1997. He left Stanford to become the president of the Carnegie Foundation for the Advancement of Teaching, serving there until 2008. He was a past president of the American Educational Research Association (AERA). He was an emeritus member of the National Academy of Education, where he also served as vice president and president, and was a fellow of the American Academy of Arts and Sciences and the American Association for the Advancement of Science.

Shulman received numerous awards recognizing his educational research, including a Guggenheim Fellowship (1972); the AERA's Distinguished Career Award (1995); the American Psychological Association’s E.L. Thorndike Award for Distinguished Psychological Contributions to Education (1995); George Washington University's President's Medal (2004); the University of Louisville Grawemeyer Award in Education (2006) for his 2004 book, The Wisdom of Practice: Essays on Teaching, Learning and Learning to Teach; the Teachers College Medal for Distinguished Service (2007); and the American Association of Colleges for Teacher Education's Lifetime Achievement Award (2008). In 2018, he was awarded an honorary doctorate by the University of Haifa. In 2021, he was awarded a second honorary doctorate from the University of Hong Kong.

Shulman was instrumental in the creation of the National Board for Professional Teaching Standards, a major effort to elevate the status of the teaching profession. Shulman was also recognized for his publications and speeches about the higher education field of the scholarship of teaching and learning (SoTL). He notably distinguished SoTL from scholarly teaching, which he described as the work "every one of us should be engaged in every day that we are in a classroom, in our office with students, tutoring, lecturing, conducting discussions, all the roles we play pedagogically." SoTL, on the other hand, is "when we step back and reflect systematically on the teaching we have done, in a form that can be publicly reviewed and built upon by our peers." This emphasis on public review and developing a collective body of knowledge was tied to his larger point that SoTL removes the widespread experience of "pedagogical solitude" by relocating postsecondary teaching within "a community of scholars." This, in turn, will elevate the status of teaching in higher education and expand what's known about teaching and learning in higher education.

== Personal life ==
Shulman married Judy Horwitz in 1960. He died on December 30, 2024, at the age of 86.

== Pedagogical content knowledge ==
Shulman (1986) claimed that the emphases on teachers' subject matter knowledge and pedagogy were being treated as mutually exclusive. To address this dichotomy, he introduced the notion of Pedagogical Content Knowledge, which includes subject-specific pedagogical knowledge, among other categories. His initial description of teacher knowledge also included curriculum knowledge and knowledge of educational contexts.

== Select publications ==
- Shulman, Lee S. (1986). Those who understand: Knowledge growth in teaching. Educational Researcher, 15(2), 4–14. doi:10.3102/0013189X015002004
- Shulman, Lee S. (1987). Knowledge and teaching: Foundations of the new reform. Harvard Educational Review, 57(1), 1–22. doi:10.17763/haer.57.1.j463w79r56455411
- Shulman, Lee S. (2004). Teaching as community property: Essays on higher education. Jossey-Bass. ISBN 978-0-470-62308-4
- Shulman, Lee S. (2004). The wisdom of practice: Essays on teaching, learning, and learning to teach. Jossey-Bass. ISBN 0787972002
- Shulman, Lee S. (2005). Signature pedagogies in the professions. Daedalus, 134(3), 52-59. 10.1162/0011526054622015

Educational offices
Preceded by Richard C. Anderson	President of the American Educational Research Association; 1984–1985	Succeeded by David Berliner
Preceded by Patricia Albjerg Graham	President of the National Academy of Education; 1989-1993	Succeeded by Carl F. Kaestle
