= Digital history =

Using digital media for furthering historical analysis, presentation, and research

Digital history is the use of digital media to further historical analysis, presentation, and research. It is a branch of the digital humanities and an extension of quantitative history, cliometrics, and computing. Digital history is commonly known as digital public history, concerned primarily with engaging online audiences with historical content, or digital research methods, that further academic research. Digital history outputs include: digital archives, online presentations, data and information visualizations, interactive maps, timelines, audio files, and virtual worlds. These outputs are designed to enhance accessibility to users, facilitating engagement with historical content. Recent digital history projects focus on creativity, collaboration, and technical innovation, text mining, corpus linguistics, network analysis, 3D modeling, and big data analysis. By utilizing these resources, the user can rapidly develop new analyses that can link to, extend, and bring to life existing histories.

== History ==
Rooted in earlier social science history work, particularly around the history of enslavement in the United States, early digital history in the 1960s and 70s focused on using computers to conduct quantitative analyses, primarily of demographic and social history data - censuses, election returns, city directories, and other tabular or countable data. - with the aim of producing defensible research findings These early computers could be programmed to conduct statistical analyses of these records, creating tallies, or seeking trends across records. This research into historical demography was rooted in the rise of social history as a field of historical interest. The historians involved in this work sought to quantify past societies, to come to new conclusions about communities and population. Computers proved capable tools for that type of work. By the late 1970s younger historians turned to cultural studies, most of these studies involved online databases that were checked by Professionals in Great Britain about once a year. The outpouring of quantitative studies by established scholars continued. Since then, quantitative history and cliometrics have been used primarily by historically minded economists and political scientists. In the late 1980s quantifiers founded the Association for History and Computing. This movement provided some of the impetus for the rise of digital history in the 1990s.

The more recent roots of digital history were in software rather than online networks. In 1982, the Library of Congress embarked on its Optical Disk Pilot Project, which placed text and images from its collection on to laserdiscs and CD-ROMs. The library started offering online exhibits in 1992 when it launched Selected Civil War Photographs. In 1993, Roy Rosenzweig, along with Steve Brier and Josh Brown, produced their award-winning CD-ROM Who Built America? From the Centennial Exposition of 1876 to the Great War of 1914, designed for Apple, Inc. that integrated images, text, film and sound clips, displayed in a visual interface that supported a text narrative.

Among the earliest online digital history projects were The Heritage Project of the University of Kansas, and medieval historian Dr. Lynn Nelson's World History Index and History Central Catalogue. Another was The Valley of the Shadow, conceived in 1991 by current University of Richmond professor of humanities and president emeritus, Edward L. Ayers, who was then at the University of Virginia. The Institute for Advanced Technology in the Humanities (IATH) at the University of Virginia adopted the Valley Project and partnered with IBM to collect and transcribe historical sources into digital files. The project collected data related to Augusta County in Virginia and Franklin County in Pennsylvania during the American Civil War. In 1996, William G. Thomas III joined Ayers on the Valley Project. Together, they produced an online article entitled "The Differences Slavery Made: A Close Analysis of Two American Communities," which also appeared in The American Historical Review in 2003. A CD-ROM also accompanied the Valley Project, published by W. W. Norton and Company in 2000.

Rosenzweig, who died October 11, 2007, founded the Center for History and New Media (CHNM) at George Mason University in 1994. Today, CHNM boasts several digital tools available to historians, such as Zotero, Omeka or Tropy. In 1997, Ayers and Thomas used the term "digital history" when they proposed and founded the Virginia Center for Digital History (VCDH) at the University of Virginia, the earliest center devoted exclusively to history. Several other institutions promoting digital history include the Center for Humane Arts, Letters, and Social Sciences Online (MATRIX) at Michigan State University, Maryland's Institute for Technology in the Humanities, and the Center for Digital Research in the Humanities at the University of Nebraska. In 2004, Emory University launched Southern Spaces, a "peer-reviewed Internet journal and scholarly forum" examining the history of the South.

== Applications ==
There are many potential benefits to the use of digital history when combined with traditional historical methods. Some of these applications include:

- Combining traditional historical methods and new research methods in order to come to new conclusions.
- Using different tools to extract and analyse larger amounts of data that would not be manageable otherwise.
- Create models and maps of data extracted to create a visualisation of the data.
- Data extracted and analysed can be placed alongside existing historiography to increase combined historical knowledge.

By adding new research methods to existing historical method, historians can benefit greatly from the ability to work with larger amounts of data and develop new interpretations from this.

== Notable Projects ==
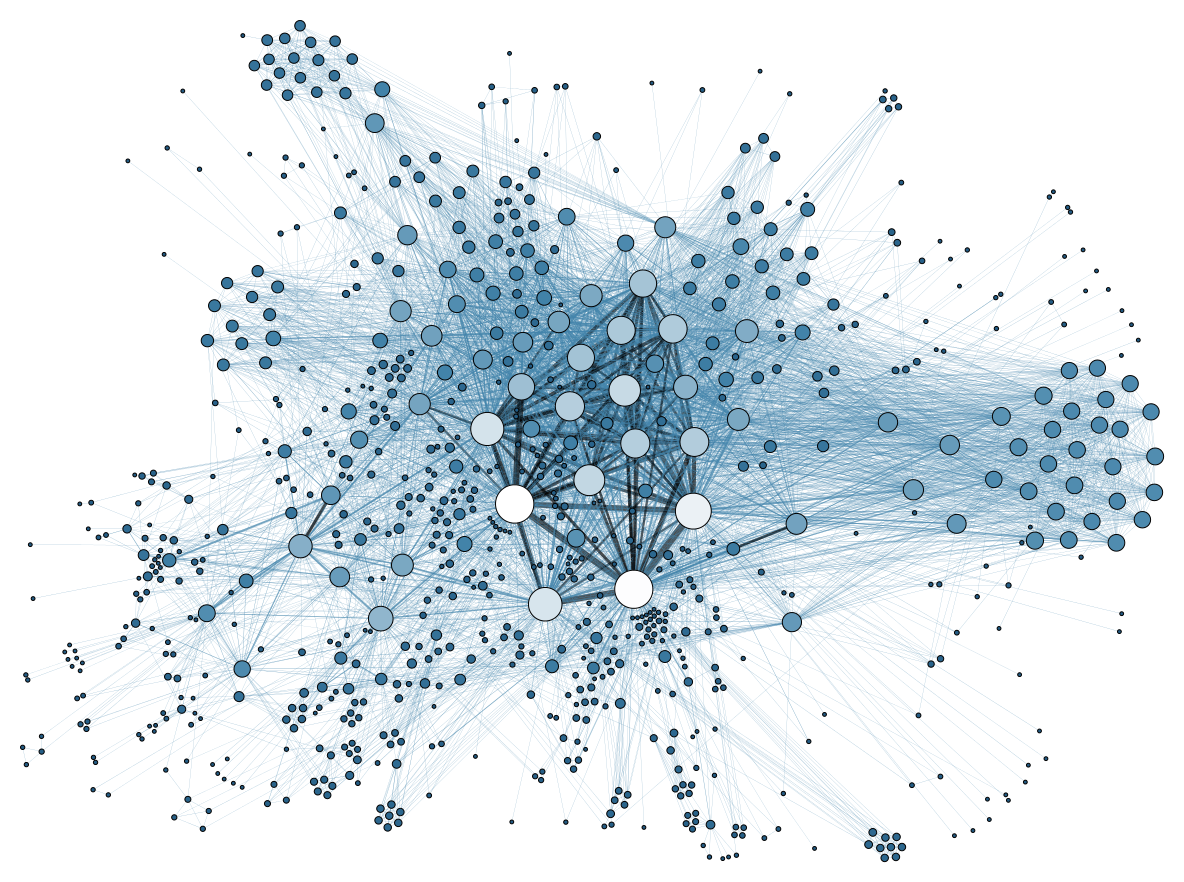
Example of historical research using digital means: network visualization of the ICIC archives, showing thousands of documents exchanged between League of Nations experts during the interwar period.

The collaborative nature of most digital history endeavors has meant that the discipline has developed primarily at institutions with the resources to sponsor content research and technical innovation. Two of the first centers, George Mason University's Center for History and New Media and the Virginia Center for Digital History at the University of Virginia have been among the leaders in the development of digital history projects and the education of digital historians.

Some of the noteworthy projects emerging from these pioneering centers are The Geography of Slavery, The Texas Slavery Project, and The Countryside Transformed at VCDH and Liberty, Equality, Fraternity: Exploring the French Revolution and The Lost Museum at the CHNM. In each of these projects, mediated archives holding multiple types of sources are combined with digital tools to analyze and illuminate an historical question to a varying degree; this integration of content and tools with analysis is one of the hallmarks of digital history—projects move beyond archives or collections and into scholarly analysis and the use of digital tools to develop that analysis. The differences between the ways projects incorporate these integrations are a measure of the development of the field and point to the ongoing debates over what digital history can and should be.

While many of the projects at VCDH, CHNM, and other university's centers have been geared towards academics and post-secondary education, the University of Victoria (British Columbia), in conjunction with the Université de Sherbrooke and the Ontario Institute for Studies in Education at the University of Toronto, has created as series of projects for all ages, "Great Unsolved Mysteries in Canadian History." Laden with instructional aids, this site asks teachers to introduce students to historical research methods to help them develop analytical skills and a sense of the complexities of their national history. Issues of race, religion, and gender are addressed in carefully constructed modules that cover incidents in Canadian history from Viking exploration through the 1920s. One of the original co-creators of the project, John Lutz has also developed Victoria's Victoria with the University of Victoria and Malaspina University-College.

In addition to Ayers, Thomas, Lutz, and Rosenzweig, numerous other individual scholars work with digital history techniques and have made and/or continue to make important contributions to the field. Robert Darnton's 2000 article, "An Early Information Society: News and the Media in Eighteenth-Century Paris" was supplemented with electronic resources and is an early model of the discussions around digital history and its future in the humanities. One of the first major digital projects to be reviewed by the American Historical Review (AHR) was Philip Ethington's "Los Angeles and the Problem of Urban Historical Knowledge"—a multimedia exploration of changes to Los Angeles' physical profile over the course of several decades. In this essay, he also expresses his beliefs that historians have major power in the new world of digital knowledge. Patrick Manning, Andrew W. Mellon Professor of World History at the University of Pittsburgh, developed the CD-ROM project "Migration in Modern World History, 1500-2000." In the "African Slave Demography Project," Manning created a demographic simulation of the slave trade to show precisely how declined in West and Central Africa between 1730 and 1850 as well as in East Africa between the years 1820 and 1890 due to slavery. He acknowledged the power digitalization had on his project, and how it reflected his belief of coevolution. Jan Reiff, of UCLA, co-edited the print and online versions of the Encyclopedia of Chicago. Andrew J. Torget, founded the Texas Slavery Project while at VCDH and continues to develop the site as he completes his PhD—likely a model for new digital scholars who will incorporate digital components into larger research agendas.

Another notable project that makes use of digital tools for historical practice is The Quilt Index. As scholars became increasingly interested in women's history, quilts became valuable to study. The Quilt Index is an online collaborative database where quilt owners can upload pictures and data about their quilts. This project was created due to the difficulty of collecting quilts. Firstly, they were in the possession of various institutions, archives, and even civilians. And secondly, they can be too fragile or bulky for physical transport.

Also in the field of women's history is Click! The Ongoing Feminist Revolution. which highlights the collective action and individual achievements of women from the 1940s to the present. In the UK, a pilot project began in 2002 to create a digital library of British History. This has developed into an extensive collection of over 1,200 volumes, bringing together primary and secondary sources from libraries, archives, museums and academics. Another significant project is the Old Bailey Online, a digital collection of all proceedings between 1674 and 1913. In addition to the digitized records, the Old Bailey Online website provides historical and legal background information, research guides, and educational resources for students.

== Digital History Classes ==
Digital history is now a common course type in graduate and undergraduate curriculum. For example, the students in Digital History courses at the University of Hertfordshire have learned skills in digital mapping and Python programming, which makes it more accessible and easier to analyse large quantities of source data. One project that the class worked on included analyzing the trends, patterns, and relationships of data related to weather, crime, and poverty. This allowed students to use their traditional history skills to evaluate the significance of their findings. Another project was using digital mapping to compare the differences between various groups of students who studied at Oxford derived from British History Online. Similarly, at Cal State East Bay, history majors meet in the science building's computer lab to go over new and old software that could be used for the creation or presentation of history.

== Technology ==
Digital technology tools arrange ideas and allow the analysis of data, with many tools previously unavailable to historians providing options for collaboration, text mining, and big data analysis. In addition, digital history offers tools for the presentation of and access to historical knowledge online.

Digital historians may use web development tools, such as WYSIWYG HTML-editor Adobe Dreamweaver. Other tools create more interactive digital history, such as Databases, which provide greater capacity for information storage and retrieval in a definable way. Databases with features like Structured Query Language (SQL) and Extensible Markup Language (XML) arrange materials in a formal manner and allow precise searching for keywords, dates, and other data characteristics. The online article "The Differences Slavery Made: A Close Analysis of Two American Communities" used XML for presenting and connecting evidence with detailed historiographical discussions. The Valley of the Shadow project also employed XML to convert all of the archive's letters, diaries, and newspapers for full text searching capabilities. Coding languages such as Python may be used in order to digitally sort and filter data, whilst Google Fusion Tables can be used for the geographical mapping of data.

Digital historians may use content management systems (CSM) to store their digital collection that includes audio, visual, images and text for an online web display. Examples of these systems include: Drupal, WordPress, and Omeka.

The Differences Slavery Made also used geographic information systems (GIS) to analyze and understand the spatial arrangement of social structures. For the article, Ayers and Thomas created many new maps through GIS technology to produce detailed images of Augusta and Franklin counties never before possible. GIS and its many components remain helpful for studying history and visualizing change over time.

The Semantic Interoperability of Metadata and Information in unLike Environments (SIMILE) project at MIT develops open-source tools for accessing, managing, and visualizing digital assets. Among the tools built by SIMILE, the Timeline tool uses a DHTML-based widget that allows digital historians to create customizable timelines for visualizing time-based events. SIMILE's Exhibit tool incorporates a customizable structure for sorting and presenting data. Exhibit, written in JavaScript, creates interactive, data-rich web pages without requiring programming or database creation knowledge.

Textual analysis software allows historians to make new use of old sources by finding patterns in large collections of documents or even just analyzing a source for frequency of terms. Textual analysis software allows historians to "text mine", or easily find correlations and themes in the documents. There are several textual-analysis programs available online, from sophisticated ones that allow the researcher to tailor the program to handle large amounts of data, like MALLET, and straightforward programs like TokenX, which generates word-frequency lists and word clouds to illustrate language usage and significance, to basic ones like Wordle, which offers simple visualizations of word frequency and relationships. Some websites provide textual analysis on their content automatically. Online bookmarking and research tool del.icio.us uses tag clouds to visually depict the frequency and importance of user-generated tags, and the recently instituted Google Ngram Viewer allows viewers to search the commonality of textual themes by year.

However, with the development of digital history and the technology used to produce it, there has been questions raised over the validity of it. One such issue, is that raised by Jean Francois Baudrillard. He says that "Western Culture introduced significant modifications to the way it produced the real, by intensifying it and heightening it into a domain of reality in hyperspace: hyper-reality".

== Digital History Centers ==
- Center for History and New Media at George Mason University
- Maryland Institute for Technology in the Humanities at the University of Maryland
- Virginia Center for Digital History at the University of Virginia
- Institute for Advanced Technology in the Humanities at the University of Virginia
- Institute for Computing in the Humanities, Arts, and Social Science at the University of Illinois.
- Center for Public History and Digital Humanities at Cleveland State University
- Department of Digital Humanities at King's College London
- HUMlab at Umeå University, Sweden
- The Digital History Center at United States Military Academy West Point

== See also ==
- Historical geographic information system
- Social media analytics
- Google Trends

== Bibliography ==
- Ayers, Edward L. "The Pasts and Futures of Digital History," University of Virginia (1999).
- Ayers, Edward L. "History in Hypertext," University of Virginia (1999).
- Battershill, Claire, and Shawna Ross. Using Digital Humanities in the Classroom: A Practical Introduction for Teachers, Lecturers, and Students (Bloomsbury Publishing, 2017).
- Bell, Johnny, et al. "'History is a conversation': teaching student historians through making digital histories." History Australia 13.3 (2016): 415–430.
- Brennan, Claire (October 2018). "Digital humanities, digital methods, digital history, and digital outputs: History writing and the digital revolution" (PDF). History Compass. 16 (10). doi:10.1111/hic3.12492.
- Burton, Orville (ed.). Computing in the Social Sciences and Humanities. Urbana: University of Illinois Press, 2002.
- Cohen, Daniel J. "History and the Second Decade of the Web". Rethinking History 8 (June 2004): 293–301.
- Cohen, Daniel J. 2005. The Future of Preserving the Past. CRM: The Journal of Heritage Stewardship 2.2 (2005): 6–19.
- Cohen, Daniel J. and Roy Rosenzweig, Digital History: A Guide to Gathering, Preserving, and Presenting the Past on the Web. (U of Pennsylvania Press, 2006).
- Crompton, Constance, Richard J. Lane, and Ray Siemens, eds. Doing Digital Humanities: Practice, Training, Research (Taylor & Francis, 2016).
- Denley, Peter and Deian Hopkin. History and Computing. Manchester: Manchester University, 1987.
- Dollar, Charles, and Richard Jensen. Historians Guide to Statistics (1971), with detailed guide to older studies
- Fridlund, M., Oiva, M., & Paju, P. (Eds). (2020). Digital histories: emergent approaches within the new digital history. HUP, Helsinki University Press.
- Gaber, G. "Mind the Gap. On archival politics and historical theory in the digital age, " Rethinking History (August 2025):1-27. https://doi.org/10.1080/13642529.2025.2545029
- Grandjean, Martin The Digital Historian's Craft. Handbook of Digital and Computational Research Methods (Edward Elgar Publishing, 2026): 32-47 (DOI 10.4337/9781802208993.00009)
- Greenstein, Daniel I. A Historian's Guide to Computing. Oxford: Oxford University Press, 1994.
- Guiliano, J. (2022). A primer for teaching digital history: ten design principles. Duke University Press.
- "Interchange: The Promise of Digital History." Special issue, Journal of American History 95, no. 2 (September 2008). https://web.archive.org/web/20090427063847/http://journalofamericanhistory.org/issues/952/interchange/index.html (accessed May 1, 2009).
- Knowles, Anne Kelly (ed.). Past Time, Past Place: GIS for History. Redlands, CA: ESRI, 2002.
- Kornbluh, Mark. 2008. From Digital Repositories to Information Habitats: H-Net, the Quilt Index, Cyber Infrastructure, and Digital Humanities. First Monday 13(8): available at https://web.archive.org/web/20120223151150/http://firstmonday.org/htbin/cgiwrap/bin/ojs/index.php/fm/article/viewArticle/2230/2019
- Lutz, John Sutton. 2007. Bed Jumping and Compelling Convergences in Historical Computing. Digital History portal, Department of History, University of Nebraska-Lincoln.
- Nelson, Robert K., Andrew J. Torget, Scott Nesbit. "A Conversation with Digital Historians", Southern Spaces, 31 January 2012.
- Rosenzweig, Roy. "Scarcity or Abundance? Preserving the Past in a Digital Era," American Historical Review 108 (June 2003): 735–62.
- Rosenzweig, Roy and Michael O'Malley. "Brave New World or Blind Alley? American History on the World Wide Web," Journal of American History 84 (June 1997): 132–55.
- Rosenzweig, Roy and Michael O'Malley. "The Road to Xanadu: Public and Private Pathways on the History Web," Journal of American History 88 (September 2001): 548–79.
- Rusert, Britt. "New World: The Impact of Digitization on the Study of Slavery." American Literary History 29.2 (2017): 267–286.
- Salmi, Hannu. What is Digital History? Cambridge: Polity, 2020.
- Thomas, William G., III. "Computing and the Historical Imagination," A Companion to Digital Humanities ed. Susan Schreibman, Ray Siemens, John Unsworth (Oxford: Blackwell, 2004).
- Thomas, William G., III. "Writing a Digital History Journal Article from Scratch: An Account," Digital History (December 2007).
- Turkel, William J, Adam Crymble, Alan MacEachern. "The Programming Historian," (London, NiCHE, 2007-9).
