= Teachinghistory.org =

Resource website

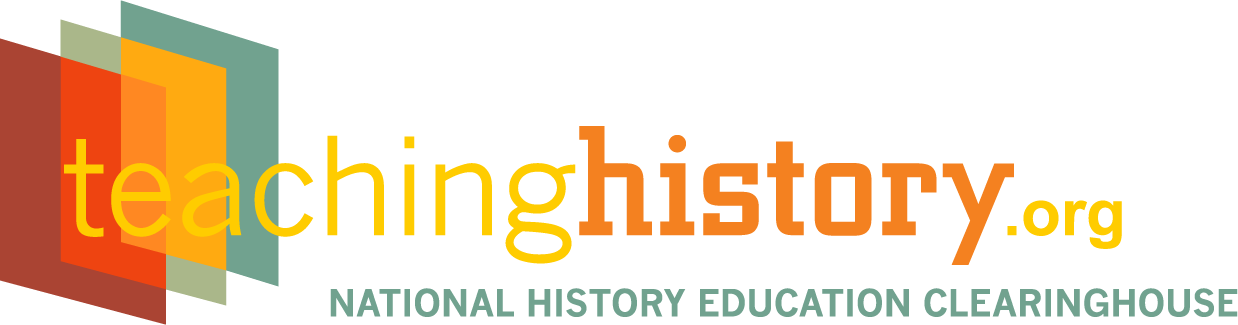
- Founded: 2008
- Founder: Center for History and New Media
- Type: Educational
- Purpose: Best practices, K-12 education, History of the United States
- Location: George Mason University, Fairfax, Virginia
- Website: www.teachinghistory.org

Teachinghistory.org, also known as the National History Education Clearinghouse (NHEC), is a website that provides educational resources for the study of U.S. history.

== Organizational background ==
In the past decade and a half, three major developments have reshaped the landscape for K-12 history education and have created the conditions for significant advances in history teaching and learning. First, the emergence of the Internet and the World Wide Web has brought unprecedented resources and possibilities to the computers of the nation's history teachers. Second, a body of serious scholarly research in history education – and the learning sciences more generally – has begun to illuminate how students actually learn history. Finally, the Department of Education's Teaching American History (TAH) program has invested more than $900 million in history education – the largest federal infusion of resources ever devoted to improving the teaching and learning of history. It was the favorite proposal of U.S. Senator Robert Byrd, and its grants are called "Byrd grants."

Due to these advancements, the United States Department of Education announced a call for proposals in 2007 to address the building, populating, and maintaining of a central website for K-12 American history educators, funded under the Teaching American History Grant program (TAH). George Mason University's Center for History and New Media was awarded the grant for the website creation the same year. The TAH program is funded under Title II-C, Subpart 4 of the Elementary and Secondary Education Act of 1965, as amended by the No Child Left Behind Act of 2001. According to the TAH program website, the goal of the program is to "raise student achievement by improving teachers’ knowledge, understanding, and appreciation of American history."

== Organizational goals ==
One goal is to bring together K-12 American history resources to help educators find and use them. Another goal is to create materials that detail strategies for teaching and learning history to help educators improve classroom teaching. A third goal is to disseminate lessons learned by more than 900 Teaching American History (TAH) grants designed to raise student achievement by improving teachers' knowledge and understanding of traditional U.S. history.

Teachinghistory.org is updated regularly and is organized around six sections: History Content, Best Practices, Teaching Materials, Issues and Research, Teaching American History (TAH) Projects, and Digital Classroom. In addition, the website offers a weekly history quiz, a blog, and features that allow users to submit history content, history teaching, and digital history questions to experts in the field.

== Partners ==
With funding from the U.S. Department of Education under the Office of Innovation and Improvement, Teachinghistory.org, also known as the National History Education Clearinghouse, was developed through a collaboration between the Roy Rosenzweig Center for History and New Media (CHNM) at George Mason University and the Stanford History Education Group at Stanford University.

CHNM and the Stanford History Education Group have worked on other projects together, including Historical Thinking Matters, a website focused on key topics in U.S. history that is designed to teach students how to critically read primary sources and how to critique and construct historical narratives.

Founded by Roy Rosenzweig, CHNM is an internationally recognized digital humanities center located in Fairfax, Virginia. Created by Sam Wineburg, the Stanford History Education Group in Stanford, California, engages in projects at the forefront of how students learn history, from elementary school to college.

Additional Teachinghistory.org partners include the American Historical Association, a professional organization for historians founded in 1884, and the National History Center, which promotes research, teaching, and learning in all fields of history.

== Resources ==
- The Blog features posts on teaching strategies, classroom experience, holidays and heritage months, and other topical issues. Authors include both Teachinghistory.org staff and guests.
- History Content presents access to online resources including reviewed history websites, national resources for history teachers, analyses of textbook content by guest historians, and searchable databases of online history lectures and historic sites. Users can submit questions via the “Ask A Historian” feature.
- Best Practices presents multimedia examples of classroom teaching, historical thinking, using primary sources, and best practices in teaching with textbooks. The goal of this section is to integrate existing research on history education with practical classroom experience to create, select, and annotate resources that emphasize best practices for teaching American history in elementary, middle, and high school classrooms.
- Teaching Materials presents classroom and teaching resources, including a searchable database of state standards. "Lesson Plan Reviews" highlights history instruction strategies, including scaffolding. Other features include "Teaching Guides," such as "Understanding and Interpreting Political Cartoons in the History Classroom," and a section on best practices when working with English language learners. Users can submit questions via the “Ask A Master Teacher” feature.
- Issues and Research presents briefs on current research in the teaching and learning of history, including articles from leading educational journals and individual studies in the teaching and learning of history nationally and internationally. Roundtable discussions present multiple views on pedagogy in the classroom. Guest participants in these discussions include professors, educational consultants, K-12 teachers, and other history and education professionals.
- Teaching American History (TAH) Projects provides informational essays on lessons learned from TAH grants, a database of TAH projects, and TAH project spotlights.
- Digital Classroom contains features on digital tools available for use in the classroom and best practices in implementing these tools. Users can submit questions via the "Ask A Digital Historian" feature.

== Scholarship ==
Teachinghistory.org provides a clearinghouse for resources, as well as approaches informed by research on the teaching and learning of history. Special attention is devoted to strategies for incorporating historical thinking skills into classroom teaching. Historical thinking skills are a set of reasoning skills, including close reading, corroboration, and contextualization, that help students think critically about the past. These skills require a style of teaching that goes beyond lectures and rote memorization. Teachinghistory.org is based on and adds to new research in history education.

== See also ==
- Teaching history
