= Ella Johnson Memorial Public Library =

Library in Hampshire, Illinois

- 42°5′56.04″N 88°31′47.64″W
- Established: 1936
- Service area: Hampshire Township, Burlington Township, Plato Township, Rutland Township

Collection
- Size: 49,885

Access and use
- Circulation: 27,053
- Population served: 16,000
- Members: 9,096

Other information
- Website: ellajohnsonlibrary.org

The Ella Johnson Memorial Public Library, located in Hampshire, Illinois, serves the approximately 16,000 residents of Hampshire, Burlington, Pingree Grove, in addition to parts of the neighboring areas of Elgin and Huntley. The Library covers a 100 square mile area in Kane County, including the Hampshire Township, plus areas of the Burlington Township, Plato Township, and Rutland Township.

The 7,200-square-foot library has a collection of over 49,885 in-house items. The library also has a growing local digital history collection of books, photographs, and historical documents of local importance. The library building includes computers, printers, a fax machine, copiers, a microfilm reader, and a mobile learning lab for computer classes. Wi-fi is also available throughout the building.

The library holds computer classes, weekly story times, monthly crafts, teen programs, monthly genealogy meetings, and more. Annual circulation of materials is approximately 27,053 and about 38,000 people visit the library each year.

== History ==
The Ella Johnson Memorial Public library began in 1936 in a room in the local high school as a Works Progress Administration project, but has moved locations several times since then. In 1942 the library was briefly relocated to the village hall before moving to a former hat shop, thanks to $5,000 donation from Mrs. Bertha Farrell Watts in December 1942. Upon her death, Mrs. Watts left $10,000 for the running of the library, with the condition that it be named for her sister Mrs. Ella Johnson and that the library focus on buying children's books. Two months later, in February 1943, the town elected to make the library into a tax funded village library.

In 1951 the library relocated to a new building, offering approximately 5,000 volumes for public circulation. In 1985 a referendum was passed which made the village library a district library to include the communities the libraries currently serves. The library moved to its current location in downtown Hampshire in 1990; the building was dedicated to the director Emily Duchaj, who served the library from 1968 to 1990.
