= The History Teacher =

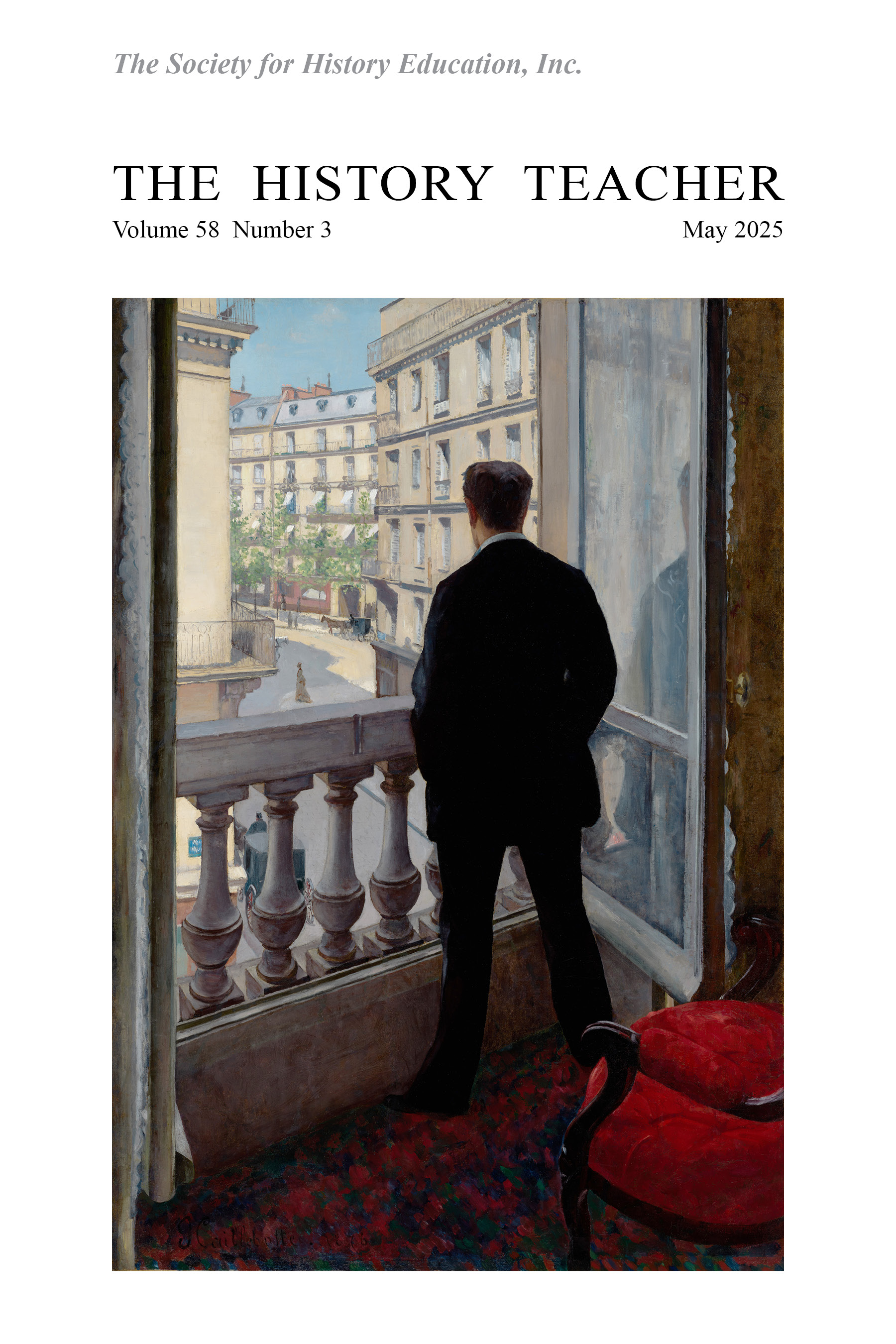
- Cover of vol. 58, no. 3
- Discipline: Education
- Language: English
- Edited by: Jane Dabel

Publication details
- Former name: Quarterly Bulletin of the Teachers' History Club
- History: 1940–present
- Publisher: Society for History Education (United States)
- Frequency: Quarterly

Standard abbreviations
- ISO 4: Hist. Teach.

Indexing
- ISSN: 0018-2745
- LCCN: 74003356
- OCLC no.: 51205644

Links
- Journal homepage; Online access

The History Teacher is a peer-reviewed quarterly academic journal concerned with the teaching of history in schools, colleges, and universities. It is considered the most widely recognized journal in the United States devoted to more effective teaching of history. The journal publishes articles on history teaching primarily at the undergraduate level, as well as historiography covering a full range of historical topics. It reviews textbooks and monographs of value in undergraduate education.

== History ==
The History Teacher began in 1940 at the History Department at the University of Notre Dame as the Quarterly Bulletin of the Teachers' History Club. Nuns attending the graduate history program in the summer edited and mimeographed the bulletin. Each issue ran 20-50 pages, with informal teaching tips, evaluations of textbooks, and short thematic essays by Notre Dame professors. Its 110 subscribers were mostly teachers at Catholic high schools in the Midwest.

In 1967, Notre Dame history Professor Leon Bernard transformed the bulletin into a national quarterly journal under the current title. He brought in a national advisory board of eminent scholars. It included only one professor based in a school of education and only one from a Catholic school. The circulation climbed to 3000.

In 1972, Professor Eugene L. Asher brought it to coordinating faculty members at the Department of History at California State University, Long Beach, and built a large staff and attracted essays from prominent scholars. The emphasis shifted from high school to college teachers. Asher set up the Society for History Education as the official publisher outside the university chain of command, and it was the vehicle for applying for major federal grants for conferences.

== See also ==
- History#Education
- Teachinghistory.org, also known as the National History Education Clearinghouse (NHEC)
