= September 11 Digital Archive =

Archive for the September 11 attacks

- Screenshot of the homepage on September 15, 2024
- Owner: Library of Congress
- Website: 911digitalarchive.org
- Launched: January 2002; 24 years ago

The September 11 Digital Archive is a digital archive that stores information relating to the September 11 attacks on the United States in 2001. It contains over 150,000 digital files including images, videos, audio, and over 40,000 first-hand accounts of the attacks. It is part of the collection of the Library of Congress.

== History ==
The September 11 Digital Archive launched in January 2002, several months after the September 11 attacks of 2001. It is developed at the Roy Rosenzweig Center for History and New Media at George Mason University in partnership with the American Social History Project of the City University of New York. The project started with a $700,000 grant from Alfred P. Sloan Foundation and aims to "create a permanent record of the events of September 11, 2001". In September 2003, a copy of the September 11 Digital Archive collection was acquired by the Library of Congress.

From 2003 to 2011 the project did not have adequate funding, which led to concerns about lack of sustainability, such as a need to redesign the website and update metadata. The archive also worried they would not be able to defend against a potential anniversary cyberattack. In 2010 it was reported that the website design had not been changed since 2004, and that although the project would still accept new submissions, they would not appear on the website. Many of these problems were solved after a Save America's Treasures grant.

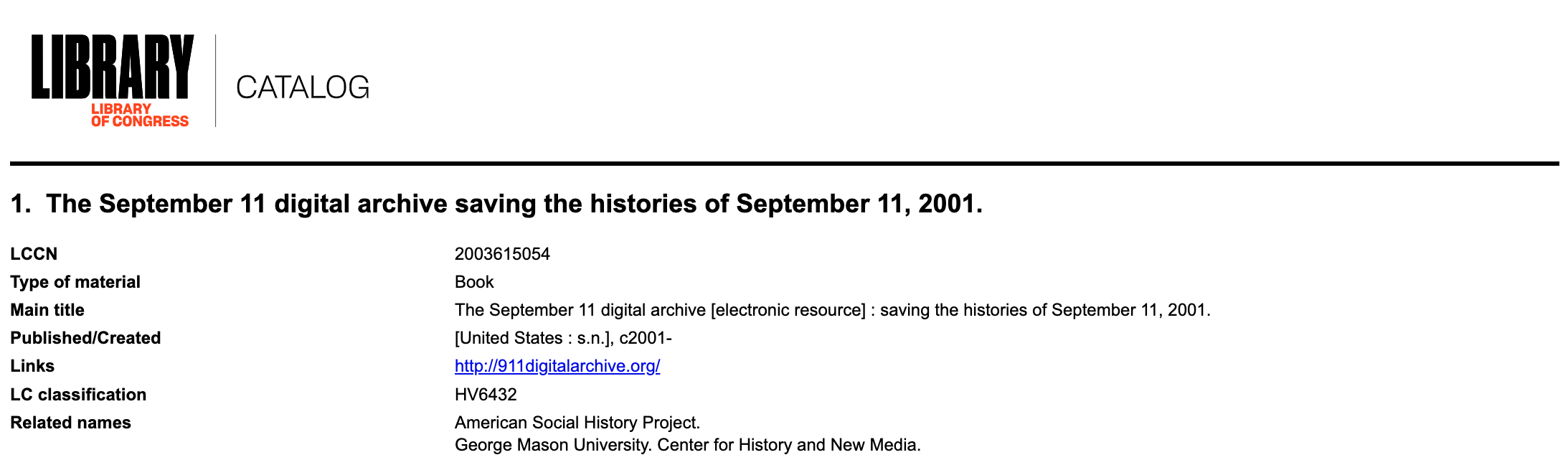

== Collection ==
The types of information stored in the archive include photos, emails, videos, animations and cartoons, stories from survivors and witnesses, audio, videos, documents, instant messages, slideshow presentations, and web blogs. Images include photos of the World Trade Center and the New York skyline before the attacks. It also has post cards and flyers from New York streets.

The archive contains documents taken from the New York City Fire Department, National Guard, the Smithsonian Institution, Red Cross and other organizations. It also contains interviews of people with ancestry from the Middle East who were affected by backlash and harassment following the attacks. The archive also went through Arabic websites and worked with the Museum of Chinese in America to record and translate interviews of Chinatown residents.

The archive originally aimed for 1,000 'stories'. By September 2002, it had 90,000, and had a total storage of 50 gigabytes in September 2003. As of 2021 there are over 150,000 digital files in the collection, including 40,000 first-hand accounts and 15,000 images.

== Contributors ==
The archive encourages many people to contribute. They do not have to be survivors or witnesses, nor to have been at the scene in New York or the Pentagon or Pennsylvania at the time. Foreigners are also encouraged to contribute; a Spanish version of the website archive was created to encourage contributions from Spanish speakers.

Because anyone can contribute to the archive, it contains some incorrect or misleading information. In the archive's FAQ section, they argue that a misleading story in the archive is still useful for historians because it "could reveal certain personal and emotional aspects of the event that would otherwise be lost in a strict authentication and appraisal process." However, it can make it difficult for historians looking through the archive to determine what is real and what is not.

== See also ==
- Canterbury Earthquakes Digital Archive, for New Zealand's Canterbury earthquakes. It was inspired by the September 11 Digital Archive.
