= Corporation for Digital Scholarship =

American nonprofit organization

- Available in: English
- Website: digitalscholar.org
- Commercial: No
- Launched: 2009; 17 years ago
- Current status: Active

The Corporation for Digital Scholarship (Digital Scholar) is a nonprofit technology organization based in Vienna, Virginia, dedicated to developing open-source software for researchers and cultural heritage institutions. It was created in 2009 by faculty at the Roy Rosenzweig Center for History and New Media at George Mason University to provide sustainability and business support for open source digital scholarship software projects that initially had funding from the Andrew W. Mellon Foundation, the United States Institute of Museum and Library Services, and the Alfred P. Sloan Foundation.

== Supported projects ==
As of 2014, Digital Scholar funded the development of the reference management tool Zotero with a global development team managed by Sean Takats while he was faculty at the Rosenzweig center. Starting in 2021, the entire development team was employed by Digital Scholar, and none were contracted through George Mason University. In 2016, CDS took over full responsibility for the Omeka family of web publishing projects.

As of 2022, Digital Scholar maintains Zotero, Omeka (for web publishing of digital cultural heritage), Tropy (for managing photographs of physical collections), PressForward (a WordPress plugin for maintaining content hubs), and Sourcery (a mobile app and community for digitizing archival collections).
