= Mr. Broadway (film) =

1933 film by Johnnie Walker

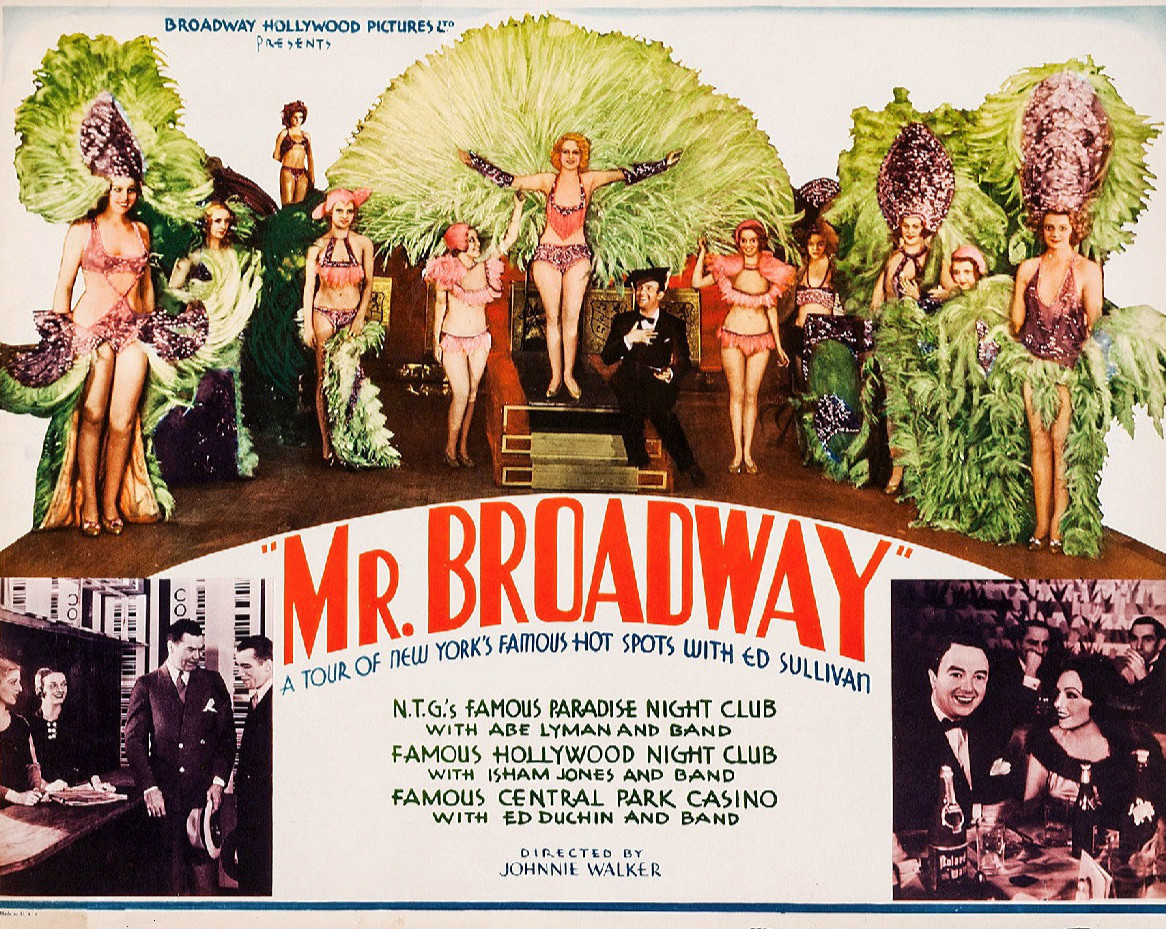
- Film poster
- Directed by: Johnnie Walker
- Written by: Abel Green; Ed Sullivan
- Starring: Ed Sullivan
- Narrated by: Ed Sullivan
- Cinematography: Frank Zucker
- Edited by: Marc Arsch
- Music by: Harold Arlen; Isham Jones
- Production company: Broadway-Hollywood Productions Ltd.
- Distributed by: Arthur Greenblatt Distribution Service
- Release date: September 12, 1933
- Running time: 63 minutes
- Country: United States
- Language: English

Mr. Broadway is a 1933 American pre-Code comedy film written by Abel Green and Ed Sullivan. The film was directed by Johnnie Walker (1894–1949) who was also a silent film actor and producer, and stars Sullivan along with a cast of celebrity walk-ons. It was shot in New York City.

== Plot ==
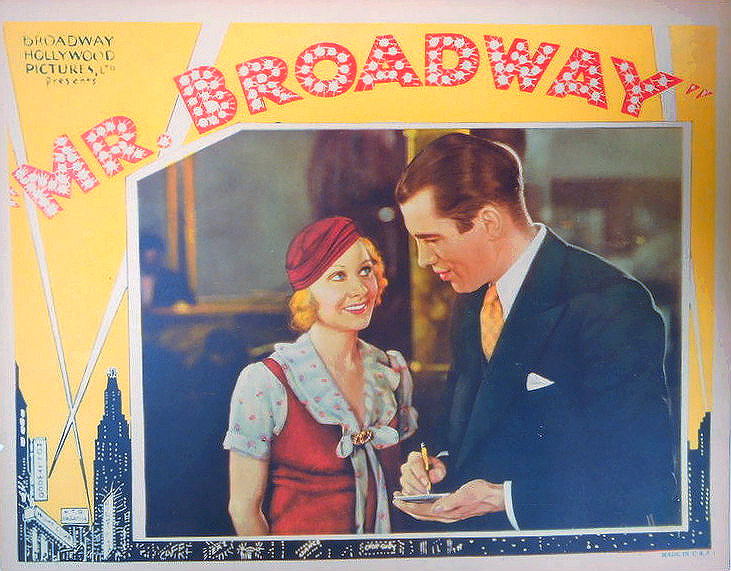
Lobby card

The plot involves a newspaper reporter (Ed Sullivan, aka "Mr. Broadway") gathering material for his column for the New York Daily News. The plot was patterned on a similar film by columnist Walter Winchell, Broadway Through a Keyhole (1933). The Sullivan film primarily serves as a vehicle for him to escort viewers to various trendy New York nightclubs to watch celebrities. The nightclubs featured were Nils T. Granlund's Paradise and Hollywood and the Central Park Casino. Abe Lyman's band is playing at the Paradise; Isham Jones at the Hollywood; and Eddy Duchin at the Casino.

== Cast ==
- Ed Sullivan as himself
- Jack Benny as himself
- Jack Dempsey as himself
- Eddy Duchin as himself
- Ruth Etting as herself
- Lita Grey as herself
- Jack Haley as himself
- Isham Jones as himself
- Bert Lahr as himself
- Mary Livingstone as herself
- Ernst Lubitsch as himself
- Lupe Vélez as herself
- Evelyn Herbert as herself
- Dita Parlo as The Girl
- William Desmond as Suitor
- Tom Moore as Other Suitor

The section of the film with Parlo, Desmond, and Moore is taken from an uncompleted film by Edgar G. Ulmer, titled Love's Interlude or The Warning Shadow, and begun in 1932 at Peerless Productions.
