= Tropy =

Desktop application for research photo management

- Developer: Center for History and New Media at George Mason University
- Release: May 9, 2017; 9 years ago
- Stable release: 1.17.3 / January 21, 2026; 7 months ago
- Written in: JavaScript with SQLite backend
- Operating system: Windows, macOS, Linux
- Platform: IA-32, x64
- Type: Reference management
- License: AGPL
- Website: www.tropy.org
- Repository: github.com/tropy/tropy

Tropy is a free and open-source desktop knowledge organization application that helps users manage and describe photographs of research materials. It was developed by the Center for History and New Media at George Mason University. Photos imported into Tropy can be combined into single items, described with metadata that is applied in bulk or created with custom metadata templates, annotated with research notes, and tagged in accordance with a researcher's preferred mode of organization.

Tropy acknowledges the ways in which that "digital photography and less-restrictive archival policies on digital reproduction for personal use" have transformed the ways that archives and their communities of users conduct research. Workshops on Tropy have been held by libraries at Brown University, Yale University, Northeastern University, and The University of Texas at Austin.

== Features ==
Tropy does not seek to be photo editing software, a citation manager, a writing platform, or an online exhibit platform. Tropy seeks to address the challenges of the now-common experience of researchers photographing objects in archives. Tropy allows users to group a collection of photos into a single document, apply multiple tags to photos to allow for organization, and provide annotations and notes to individual items and groups of items. Material in Tropy can also be exported to JSON-LD and Omeka to allow collaboration with others.

Items are organized through a drag-and-drop interface, and can search the users' collections.

Currently, the platform accepts JPEG, PNG, SVG, AVIF, GIF, HEIC, JP2, PDF, TIF, WEBP file formats.

== Financial support ==
The Andrew W. Mellon Foundation funded Tropy's development. Tropy's public released happened in October 2017. As of 2021, it is maintained by the Corporation for Digital Scholarship.

== See also ==
- Knowledge organization systems
- Comparison of reference management software
