= Texas Slavery Project =

The Texas Slavery Project is a digital history project created by Andrew J. Torget, currently Assistant Professor of History at the University of North Texas. It aims to explore the expansion of slavery between the years 1837 and 1845 in the lands in and around what would eventually become the state of Texas. It has been listed as among "the best and most important new work" in the developing digital history medium. The project was presented at the 2007 Nebraska Digital Workshop held by the Center for Digital Research in the Humanities at the University of Nebraska-Lincoln.

== Project creation ==
The initial creation of the Texas Slavery Project arose from the needs of Andrew J. Torget while writing his doctoral dissertation examining the movement of American slaveholders and their slaves into Mexico during the 1820-1840s. Using the collection of tax information Torget assembled during his research, he created a database of population levels which was adapted into a digital MySQL format to allow greater control over the information contained in the database. Using the data from this new database, Torget then used Geospatial Information Systems (GIS) to visualize the spatial relations reflected in the population information which created highly complicated interactive maps. In an interview with the University of Nebraska-Lincoln's Digital History website, Torget claimed that that use of these digital techniques provided for him "a microscope, of sorts, to look into the data that I already have in ways that, otherwise, I couldn't have done."

In their examination of "exemplar" digital history projects in the May 2009 issue of the American Historical Society's Perspectives on History, historians Douglas Seefeldt and William G. Thomas heralded the Texas Slavery Project for its display of "how a digital project might extend, deepen, and launch interpretive aspects of a dissertation."

== Project overview ==
According to the project's founder and director, Andrew J. Torget, the Texas Slavery Project endeavors to use digital technologies such as the MySQL database system and GIS mapping tools in order to analyze the spread of American slavery into the borderlands between Mexico and the United States. Through the use of digital maps, a database of historical population levels, and digitized primary source documents, the project examines the role of slavery in the development of the American Southwest.

== Project contents ==
=== Maps ===
The maps contained within the project are, in fact, one decidedly interactive map for the years 1837-1845 which displays slave and slaveholder population statistics of the counties of Texas as well as various layers of data such as U.S. borders, regional rivers, a moveable timeline, and graphs displaying the rate of change in the population data. The information on the map can also be animated to see how the trends change over time. An additional feature graphs the information contained on the map and allows users to control the contents of the graph. The map and graph are in turn linked directly to the information in the database. For example, clicking on the outline of Nacogdoches County with the timeline demarking 1838 reveals the population information pertinent to Nacogdoches in 1838. This information is also provided by clicking on the point of the Nacogdoches county graph indicating 1838. "As a research and education tool this has the capacity to quickly show historical patterns and correlations that would otherwise have been extremely difficult to identify and illustrate."

=== Database ===
The project contains a searchable database of the population information compiled from Texas tax records. It is searchable by County or County Criteria, both of which allow the user to filter the search results as he or she chooses. The database contains information regarding the total slave population, total master population, masters with 1-4 slaves, masters with 5-9 slaves, masters with 10-19 slaves, masters with 20-49 slaves, masters with 50+ slaves, and the average slaveholding. The search results are downloadable in a text format. There are also a variety of graphs and statistics from data in the population database.

=== Primary sources ===
The project contains digitized copies of primary source documents from the 1820s through the 1840s. The documents are organized by the type of document: The Laws of Texas, the Diplomatic Correspondence of the Republic of Texas, the James F. Perry Papers, the Telegraph & Texas Register of Houston, and the Civilian & Galveston Gazette. The user has the option of browsing the documents or using the search engine.

== See also ==
- Digital History- Notable Projects
- Slavery in the United States
- Ashworth Act
