= Institute for Computing in the Humanities, Arts, and Social Science =

US research institute

The Institute for Computing in Humanities, Arts, and Social Science (I-CHASS) at the University of Illinois at Urbana–Champaign was established in 2005 to conduct research at the intersection of high performance computing and humanities, arts, and social science. I-CHASS is hosted by the National Center for Supercomputing Applications (NCSA) and maintains strategic partnerships with NCSA, the Great Lakes Consortium for Petascale Computation (GLCPC), and the Illinois Informatics Institute (I3).

== Directors ==
The director of the institute is Vernon Burton, professor of history, African American studies, and sociology at the University of Illinois at Urbana–Champaign. He is also the associate director for humanities and social sciences and senior research scientist at the National Center for Supercomputing Applications (NCSA).

The executive director is Kevin Franklin, senior research scientist at the National Center for Supercomputing Applications (NCSA).

== Projects ==
The institute sponsors a number of digital projects.
