= Leon Bernard =

- Died: May 9, 1989

Academic background
- Education: Tulane University (BA); University of North Carolina at Chapel Hill

Academic work
- Discipline: History
- Sub-discipline: French history
- Institutions: John Carroll University; University of Notre Dame
- Notable works: The Emerging City

Leon Bernard was an American historian specializing in French history. He was a professor at the University of Notre Dame and the founder of The History Teacher.

== Early life and education ==
Bernard earned his bachelor's degree from Tulane University in 1938. Later, he earned graduate degrees at the University of North Carolina at Chapel Hill in 1947 and 1950.

== Academic career ==
Bernard taught at John Carroll University for one year beginning in 1949. He joined the University of Notre Dame in 1950 and later became a full professor. He remained with the university for 40 years.

In 1967, Bernard founded the peer-reviewed journal The History Teacher, and was its editor until its editorial office moved to California State University, Long Beach in 1972. He also reviewed manuscripts on French history for Macmillan and for the University of Notre Dame Press.

== Published works ==
During his tenure at the University of Notre Dame, Bernard specialized in, and published several works on 17th-century France, the French Revolution and the Napoleonic era.

Bernard received the Koren Prize from the Society for French Historical Studies for the article "French Society and Popular Uprisings Under Louis XIV," published in 1964.

In 1972, Bernard published the monograph The Emerging City, published by Duke University Press, which examined Paris in the seventeenth century.

He was also named in the Dictionary of American Scholars.

== Personal life ==
Bernard passed away on died May 9, 1989.
