= Susan Porter Benson =

American historian

- Born: July 26, 1943; Washington, Pennsylvania, U.S.
- Died: June 20, 2005 (aged 61); Manchester, Connecticut, U.S.
- Occupations: Historian; academic

Academic background
- Education: Simmons College (BA); Brown University (MA, PhD)

Academic work
- Discipline: Labor history, women's studies
- Institutions: University of Connecticut; University of Missouri; Bristol Community College
- Notable works: Counter Cultures: Saleswomen, Managers, and Customers in American Department Store

Susan Porter Benson (July 26, 1943 – June 20, 2005) was an American historian and academic, specializing in labor history and women's studies as well as public and cultural history. She taught at Bristol Community College (1968–86), the University of Missouri (1986–93), and the University of Connecticut (1993–2005). Her book Counter Cultures influenced the field of labor and women's history and consumer culture. Presenting the Past: Essays on History and the Public, which she co-edited with Stephen Brier and Roy Rosenzweig, inspired the Temple University Press book series Critical Perspectives on the Past.

== Life and career ==
A native of Washington, Pennsylvania, Benson received her BA degree from Simmons College in 1964, her MA from Brown University in 1968, and her PhD from Brown in 1983. She taught as a visiting professor at the University of Warwick (1984) and Yale University (1998) and served as director of women's studies at the University of Connecticut from 1993 to 1998.

Benson served on the editorial boards of Labor History, Journal of American History, American Quarterly, Gender & History, and Radical History Review. She also served on committees of the Organization of American Historians, Berkshire Conference on the History of Women, Labor and Working-Class History Association, and Rhode Island Committee for the Humanities.

Benson died of cancer in Manchester, Connecticut, at the age of 61.

== Published books ==
- Benson, Susan Porter (1986). Counter Cultures: Saleswomen, Managers, and Customers in American Department Stores, 1890-1940. Urbana: University of Illinois Press. ISBN 978-0-252-01252-5. OCLC 12557301.
- Benson, Susan Porter; Brier, Stephen; Rosenzweig, Roy (1986). Presenting the Past: Essays on History and the Public. Philadelphia: Temple University Press. ISBN 978-0-87722-406-8. OCLC 12810303.
- Benson, Susan Porter (2007). Household Accounts: Working-Class Family Economies in the Interwar United States. Ithaca, NY: Cornell University Press. ISBN 978-0-8014-5426-4. OCLC 1097085047.
