= Sam Wineburg =

American psychologist and academic

- Born: 1958 (age 67–68)

Academic background
- Education: Brown University; UC Berkeley; Stanford University
- Doctoral advisor: Lee Shulman

Academic work
- Institutions: Stanford University

Samuel S. Wineburg (born 1958) is an American educational and cognitive psychologist. He is the Margaret Jacks Professor of Education and, by courtesy, of History & American Studies emeritus at Stanford University.

Since the 1990s, Wineburg has been a leading figure in research on historical thinking and the teaching and learning of history. Wineburg's work has proved foundational in establishing a "heuristic" stream of research on historical thinking which seeks to close the gap between the critical and interpretive work of historians and the fact-based work of students. Wineburg's more recent work has focused on how individuals evaluate the reliability of digital information.

== Early life and education ==
Sam Wineburg was born in 1958. He was raised in Utica, New York in a Reform Jewish family.

Wineburg attended Brown University, where he studied under Jacob Neusner. Neusner told Wineburg "you will have to leave Brown to become Jewishly educated," prompting Wineburg to spend a year and a half in Israel studying Hebrew and living on kibbutzes. Upon his return to the United States, Wineburg transferred to the University of California, Berkeley, where he graduated with a degree in the history of religion. Wineburg earned his Ph.D. in Psychological Studies in Education at Stanford University in 1990, where Lee Shulman served as his advisor.

== Research Career ==
Wineburg's work has formed the foundation for one of two dominant streams of research on historical thinking in the United States. Wineburg argues that while historians critically analyze documents and examine the motives of authors, American students of history are relegated to the task of "searching for facts." According to Wineburg, this "breach" between school and academia can be addressed through three historical thinking heuristics: sourcing, contextualization, and corroboration. Wineburg defines heuristics as "sense-making activities [that] help their user resolve contradictions, see patterns and make distinctions among different types of evidence." Wineburg's approach "has been criticized for its overemphasis on a disciplinary form of knowledge more attuned to academic education than to the broader educational context and its attention to civic republicanism and the sociocultural milieu in which history learning takes place."

Wineburg co-founded the Stanford History Education Group in 2002 and became a member of the National Academy of Education in 2015.

=== Verified ===
In 2023, Wineburg and Mike Caulfield released their book Verified: How to Think Straight, Get Duped Less, and Make Better Decisions About What to Believe Online. It provides a guide on how to use Caulfield's 'SIFT' method to quickly figure out what is likely or unlikely to be true.
