= American Social History Project =

University research center for the study of social history

American Social History Project/Center for Media and Learning
- Established: 1981
- Affiliations: City University of New York
- Location: New York, New York, United States
- Website: ashp.cuny.edu
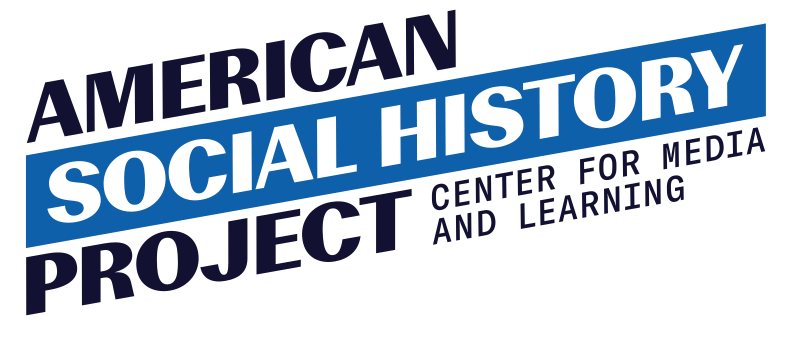

The American Social History Project/Center for Media and Learning (ASHP/CML) is a research center at the City University of New York Graduate Center developing innovative instructional materials and approaches to teaching and learning the social history of the United States.

== History ==
Founded in 1981 by historians Herbert Gutman and Stephen Brier as the American-Working Class History Project, the project grew out of a 1977–80 series of National Endowment for the Humanities summer seminars that introduced new social history scholarship to trade union members from diverse occupations and backgrounds, most of whom had no college experience. Building on the summer seminars, the new project was funded by NEH with the goal of creating a curriculum on the history of U.S. working people using scholarly articles edited for readability and slide tape programs.

Confronted by the limited accessibility of academic writing, in 1983, the project turned to writing a synthesis of U.S. social history accompanied by multimedia presentations. With funding from the Ford Foundation to develop curricular materials for community colleges, the now American Social History Project produced a two-volume trade book, Who Built America? Working People and the Nation's Economy, Politics, Culture, and Society, published by Pantheon Books in 1989 and 1992. They also produced a series of documentaries originally made as slide tape programs, 16 mm film, and videos that have since been digitized for DVD and the web. Subsequent editions of Who Built America? were published by Worth Publishers and Bedford/St. Martin's as textbooks in 2000 and 2008.

With the availability of the documentaries and book in 1989, ASHP began a series of professional development programs funded by the Diamond Foundation, Dewitt Wallace-Reader's Digest Fund, Pew Charitable Trusts, CUNY Office of Academic Affairs, and New York City Department of Education to bring new social history to instructors at both the community college and high school levels in New York City and nationwide.

In 1991, ASHP became an early adopter of digital formats in history education in collaboration with The Voyager Company, creating the CD-ROM Who Built America? From the Centennial Celebration of 1876 to the Great War of 1914 published in 1993. In 1994, Apple included the title as part of its educational package, distributing the material to thousands of schools nationwide. Additional digital projects, both on CD-ROM and for the web, soon followed, several produced in collaboration with Roy Rosenzweig and his Center for History and New Media at George Mason University. Along with its digital projects, beginning in 1996 ASHP created professional development programs with the NEH-funded New Media Classroom to help college faculty develop lesson plans incorporating new digital technologies into humanities courses, one of the Endowment's first digital humanities projects.

Two notable projects developed in the early 2000s include The Lost Museum and the September 11 Digital Archive. The Lost Museum, developed in partnership with the Center for History and New Media at George Mason University with support from the NEH and The Durst Organization’s Old York Foundation, is a three-dimensional re-creation of P. T. Barnum's American Museum (the most visited cultural attraction in the nineteenth-century United States). Along with extensive archive and teaching resources, the site presents the Museum as an interactive, clue-based historical game in which users investigate a series of mysteries and, in so doing, experience the era's controversies over race, gender, reform, immigration, sectionalism, and popular culture. The Lost Museum received awards from the Center for Digital Education, the National Endowment for the Humanities, the WorldFest Film Festival, and the New York Metropolitan Archivists Roundtable. The September 11 Digital Archive, on the other hand, is a crowd-sourced archive of the experiences of those who lived through the September 11, 2001 attacks. It contains more than 150,000 digital items, including more than 40,000 emails and other electronic communications, more than 40,000 first-hand stories, and more than 15,000 digital images. In September 2003, the Library of Congress accepted the Archive into its collections, making it the Library's first major digital acquisition.

In the second decade of the twenty-first century, ASHP continued to develop web-based history projects for the public and professional development programs for faculty from middle school through university, including Mission US (an award-winning adventure-style online game in which players take on the role of young people during critical moments in U.S. history, created in collaboration with WNET, and Electric Funstuff), and the NEH-funded Who Built America? Open Educational Resource, launched in the fall of 2024.

The Who Built America? OER is a free online resource intended for classroom use and general audiences. It includes an expanded and updated version of the textbook, alongside new essays reflecting current scholarship in US History, and primary sources imported from the History Matters repository, originally co-developed by ASHP and the Roy Rosenzweig Center for History and New Media at George Mason University. The OER was described by former ASHP Executive Director Josh Brown as “the culmination of the project.”

In 2022, ASHP also began work on Past/Present: Linking History to Current Events, an initiative funded by a grant from the American Historical Association’s Grants to Sustain and Advance the Work of Historical Organizations. ASHP researchers compiled three digital collections containing primary sources related to themes and topics—such as Environmental Justice, American Workers and the Struggle for Economic Opportunity, and Settler Colonialism and Indigenous Resistance—through which educators can connect the past to the present. The collections were added to ASHP's digital database, Social History for Every Classroom (SHEC).

== Professional Development ==
The American Social History Project/Center for Media and Learning has a long history of providing professional development programs to history faculty at the K-12 and college levels that continues to the present day. The first of these programs for K-12 teachers began in 1989, when ASHP/CML staff and CUNY faculty worked with teams of social studies and English teachers in New York City public high schools to develop model interdisciplinary humanities curriculum using student-centered, inquiry-based teaching and learning methods. Versions of this program, known as Making Connections, expanded to urban public high schools in Chicago; Philadelphia; Los Angeles; Memphis; Seattle, Lowell, Massachusetts; and Flint, Michigan through funding initiatives from the Aaron Diamond Foundation the DeWitt Wallace-Reader's Digest Fund (now the Wallace Foundation), and the Pew Charitable Trusts. Between 2003 and 2014, ASHP/CML partnered with school districts in New York City and Pennsylvania to develop and implement a total of nine Teaching American History professional development programs funded by the U.S. Department of Education. These programs served middle and high school teachers in New York City. In 2013 ASHP/CML launched Who Built America Badges for History Education an online professional learning community where grade 7-12 history teachers can earn digital badges by demonstrating competence in instructional design and understanding of disciplinary literacy skills.

ASHP/CML's professional development work with college faculty began in 1996. Prompted by the then early use of new digital technology in high school and college classes, ASHP/CML established the New Media Classroom program, funded by the National Endowment for the Humanities and the W.K. Kellogg Foundation. The program established a national network of new media and pedagogy centers (most on college campuses) that helped faculty integrate technology into humanities courses in meaningful ways. Since 2012, ASHP/CML has hosted National Endowment for the Humanities sponsored Summer Institutes for college and university faculty on the visual culture of the American Civil War. The two-week institutes take place at The Graduate Center of the City University of New York; participants are selected through a competitive application process. From 2013 to 2015 ASHP/CML also organized Bridging Historias Through Latino History and Culture, a professional development program for community college humanities faculty in New York, New Jersey, Connecticut, and Pennsylvania. Bridging Historias included a seminar series for faculty, online reading discussions, curricular development mentoring, and a program aimed at academic administrators to help expand the teaching and understanding of Latino history and culture across the humanities disciplines.

Other professional development for middle and high school teachers included LGBTQ+ Histories of the United States, a two-week NEH Summer Institute for secondary school history and humanities instructors. ASHP/CML held institutes on this topic in July 2022 (virtual) and 2024 (hybrid -- virtual and in-person), in order to give educators an opportunity to engage with current LGBTQ+ scholarship, discuss key pedagogical and methodological issues, and learn about materials held by the New York Public Library, the Lesbian Herstory Archives, the LGBT Community Center and other repositories.

In addition, in 2020-2021, the Social Studies division of the New York City Department of Education, contracted with ASHP/CML to design lessons for Hidden Voices: LGBTQ+ Stories in United States History. This supplement to the social studies curriculum was distributed by the Department to educators in the city's public schools and made available online. ASHP/CML worked with New York City-area teachers and outside scholars to develop new lessons suitable for elementary, middle, and high school grade levels, accompanied with primary sources and materials.

== ASHP's Executive Directors ==
Stephen Brier (1981–1998)
Joshua Brown (1998–2019)
Anne Valk (2020–2026)
Stefano Morello (2026-Present)
