= Pam Grossman =

American scholar and occultist

- Born: February 14, 1981 (age 45)
- Education: B.A., New York University (2003)
- Occupations: author, curator, podcaster, teacher
- Spouse: Matthew Freeman
- Website: https://www.pamgrossman.com

Pam Grossman (born February 14, 1981) is a Brooklyn-based American author, curator, and teacher of magical practice and history. She is the creator and host of The Witch Wave podcast. She is also the author and editor of several publications relating to the occult and witches. She is also the co-founder and co-organizer of the biennial Occult Humanities Conference at New York University.

== Early life and education ==
Grossman was raised in New Jersey to a Jewish family. She became interested in witchcraft at an early age. She cites as an influence the book Wise Child by Monica Furlong which has a witch named Juniper in it, whom she still likes.

Grossman graduated from New York University (NYU) in 2003 with a degree in cultural anthropology.

== Career ==
Grossman began working at Getty Images as a sales consultant in 2003 and was appointed Director of Visual Trends in 2013. As Director of Visual Trends, she led a team that analyzed and predicted trends within media, then worked with art directors and photo editors to curate Getty Images’ collection of images and video.

In October 2005, Grossman founded the blog Phantasmaphile, a blog dedicated to esoteric art and culture. The blog officially closed in September 2025..In 2009, Grossman co-founded Observatory, an arts and event space in Brooklyn. Grossman's programming highlighted mysticism and the occult. The space closed in 2014. Grossman is the co-organizer of the biennial Occult Humanities Conference at NYU. The conference was founded in 2013.

=== The Witch Wave with Pam Grossman ===
In 2017, Grossman launchedThe Witch Wave podcast. The podcast centers on magic, creativity, and culture, with Grossman interviewing a range of guests, including the drag queen Jinkx Monsoon; scholar Ronald Hutton; musicians Neko Case, Bat For Lashes, and Chelsea Wolfe; authors Madeline Miller and Augusten Burroughs; actors Rachel True and Suranne Jones; comedian Chris Fleming; and prominent witches and occultists Starhawk, Mitch Horowitz, and Bri Luna of The Hoodwitch. As of September 24, 2025, it is in its ninth season.

The Witch Wave is featured in Sean Malin's 2025 book The Podcast Pantheon: 101 Podcasts That Changed How We Listen.

=== Writing ===
Grossman contributed the text to Tin Can Forest's illustrated book What Is A Witch, first published in 2016 and reprinted in 2024.

She has also written the books What Is A Witch and Waking the Witch: Reflections on Women, Magic, and Power. The latter is part memoir, chronicling Grossman's path to becoming a practicing witch.

In 2021, Grossman was co-editor and co-author with Jessica Hundley for Witchcraft, the third book in Taschen’s Library of Esoterica series. The volume explores the history of witchcraft through over 400 artworks and features essays and interviews with prominent figures in modern witchcraft.

Her latest book, Magic Maker: The Enchanted Path to Creativity, was released in 2025.

== Critical reception ==
Of Grossman's book What Is A Witch, The Beat's Philippe Leblanc said “Her master of the topic and the pen allows this story to feel refreshing and unique.”

The Times Literary Supplement called Grossman's second book, Waking the Witch: Reflections on Women, Magic, and Power, a “beguiling exploration of witches across history, myth, art and pop culture.”

Of the book Witchcraft, which Grossman co-edited with Jessica Hundley, The New York Times called it “a decadent feast for the eyes, laced with belladonna,” and CNN considered it “a visually vibrant volume that isn’t so much a book as it is a spellbinding tribute to a figure and a practice that are as old as time.”

== Awards and honors ==
Grossman was also selected as one of LinkedIn’s Next Wave "Top Professionals 35 & Under", and named one of Adweek’s Creative 100.

In 2014, Grossman was named one of Marie Claire’s “20 Women Who Are Changing the Ratio” for her work on Getty Images’ Lean In Collection in collaboration with Sheryl Sandberg's LeanIn.org. The collection also received the International Center of Photography's Infinity Award.

== Personal life ==
Grossman is married to playwright Matthew Freeman.

== Bibliography ==
=== Author ===
- 2016 - What Is A Witch: An Illuminated Manifesto (Tin Can Forest Press) ISBN 978-0-9880222-3-2
- 2019 - Waking the Witch: Reflections on Women, Magic, and Power (Gallery Books/Simon & Schuster) ISBN 978-1-9821-4585-9
- 2021 - Witchcraft (The Library of Esoteria) (Taschen) ISBN 978-3-8365-8560-6
- 2025 - Magic Maker: The Enchanted Path to Creativity (Penguin Life and Hay House UK) ISBN 978-0-593-83236-3

=== Contributor ===
- 2014 - Earth Magic (Fulgur Esoterica)
- 2017 - Witches, Sluts, Feminists: Conjuring the Sex Positive (ThreeL Media) ISBN 978-0-9964852-7-2
- 2017 - Literary Witches (Seal/Hachette) ISBN 978-1-58005-673-1
- 2018 - Le Tarot de L'étoile Cachée (Sabat Magazine)
- 2019 - Ascend Ascend (Third Man Books) ISBN 978-0-9974578-3-4
- 2019 - Cat Call: Reclaiming the Feral Feminine (Weiser Books) ISBN 978-1-57863-662-4
- 2020 - Major Arcana: Portraits of Witches in America (Andrew McMeel Publishing) ISBN 978-1-5248-5833-9
- 2022 - Spiritus Mundi: Writings Borne from the Occult (Liminal11) ISBN 978-1-912634-46-0
- 2022 - The Meaning of Witchcraft (Weiser Books) ISBN 978-1-57863-789-8
