= Kevin Franklin =

American academic

Kevin Franklin is an American academic.

He was born in Virginia, where he received degrees in psychology and education from Old Dominion University. He holds a Doctorate of Education in organization and leadership from the University of San Francisco. Formerly executive director of the University of California system-wide Humanities Research Institute (UCHRI) and a deputy director of the San Diego Supercomputer Center (SDSC), Franklin was appointed as executive director of the Institute for Computing in Humanities, Arts, and Social Science and senior research scientist for the National Center for Supercomputing Applications in July 2007. In addition, Franklin was appointed associate director for the National Center for Supercomputing Applications in 2014.

Franklin is a principal co-founder of and serves on the executive committee of the Humanities, Arts, Science and Technology Alliance and Collaboratory (HASTAC). In May 2007, Franklin co-guest edited with David Theo Goldberg Cyberinfrastructure Technology Watch for the issue "Socializing Cyberinfrastructure: Networking the Humanities, Arts, and Social Sciences". In addition to his United States HASS Cyberinfrastructure work, Franklin is principal investigator of a number of international research activities, including the Organization of American States Advanced Research and Technology Collaboratory for the Americas (OAS-ARTCA), which he co-founded in 2007 and which is now hosted at the Organization of the American States (OAS) Office in Washington DC. The Collaboratory serves the OAS 35 member countries.

Franklin began his academic career teaching and coaching at San Francisco State University, where he also directed the Urban Scholars Minority Student Outreach Program and was a senior fellow in the San Francisco Urban Institute. Franklin served as vice-chair of the board of directors and interim executive director for Summerbridge National (currently named Breakthrough Collaborative) and he was a founder of the San Francisco Boys and Girls Club Project Discover Program and a co-founder of the TEAMS AmeriCorps Minority Teacher Fellowship Program.

In recognition for his work in education reform and founding of the Multicultural Alliance, a National Minority Teacher Fellowship program, Franklin received the Old Dominion University Distinguished Alumni Award in 1996 and the Columbia University Teachers College Klingenstein Center Leadership Award in 1997. Franklin was named one of the Top 12 People to Watch in 2010 in Supercomputing by HPCwire and received the HPCwire Workforce Diversity Leadership Award in 2014.
