= Elizabeth Blackmar =

American historian and author

Elizabeth Blackmar is an American historian, author, and professor who specializes in the social history of the American economy and infrastructure. Blackmar is known for her book The Park and the People: A History of Central Park co-written with Roy Rosenzweig. She is the Mary and David Boies Professor of American History at Columbia University.

== Early life and education ==
Blackmar received a B.A. from Smith College in 1972 and a Ph.D. from Harvard University in 1981.

== Career ==
Blackmar specializes in urban and social history.

From 1995 to 1996, she was awarded a Fellowship from the Russell Sage Foundation.

In 2011, Blackmar was recognized by the American Historical Association with its Nancy Lyman Roelker Mentorship Award. The prize committee noted that "from the evidence submitted in the supporting letters, it was clear that Dr. Blackmar set [a] tone of friendship, openness, and trust from the very beginning of the relationship. Even when students were being firmly guided and directed, she was able to do it in a way that never felt intrusive to them. And that ability to approach her advising, based on empathy and openness, laid the foundation not only for effective and enduring mentoring but for lifelong connections."

In 2012–2013, Blackmar was a fellow at the Cullman Center.

In 2025, Blackmar won a Lenfest Distinguished Teaching Award from Columbia University.

=== Bibliography ===
- Manhattan for Rent, 1785-1850
- The Park and the People: A History of Central Park, with Roy Rosenzweig
