= Roy Rosenzweig =

American historian

- Born: Roy Alan Rosenzweig; August 6, 1950; New York City, New York, U.S.
- Died: October 11, 2007 (aged 57); Arlington, Virginia, U.S.
- Awards: Guggenheim Fellowship

Academic background
- Education: Columbia University (BA); St John's College, Cambridge; Harvard University (PhD)
- Influences: Herbert Gutman

Academic work
- Institutions: Wesleyan University; Worcester Polytechnic Institute; George Mason University; American Historical Association
- Main interests: American History, Working class culture
- Notable works: Eight Hours for What We Will (1983)

Roy Alan Rosenzweig (August 6, 1950 – October 11, 2007) was an American historian. He was the founder and director of the Center for History and New Media at George Mason University from 1994 until his death in October 2007 from lung cancer, aged 57. After his death, the center was renamed the Roy Rosenzweig Center for History and New Media in his honor.

== Early life and education ==
Roy Alan Rosenzweig was born on August 6, 1950, in New York City and was raised in Bayside, Queens. He graduated from Columbia College with a Bachelor of Arts, magna cum laude, in 1971 and received a fellowship to study history at St John's College, Cambridge. In 1978, Rosenzweig earned his Doctor of Philosophy in history from Harvard University.

== Career ==
Rosenzweig was the co-author, with Elizabeth Blackmar, of The Park and the People: A History of Central Park, which won several awards including the 1993 Historic Preservation Book Award and the 1993 Urban History Association Prize for Best Book on North American Urban History. He also co-authored (with David Thelen) The Presence of the Past: Popular Uses of History in American Life, which won prizes from the University of Mary Washington Center for Historic Preservation and the American Association for State and Local History. He was co-author, with Steve Brier and Joshua Brown, of the American Social History Project's CD-ROM, Who Built America? , which won James Harvey Robinson Prize of American Historical Association for its “outstanding contribution to the teaching and learning of history.”

Rosenzweig's other books include Eight Hours for What We Will: Workers and Leisure in an Industrial City, 1870–1920 and edited volumes on history museums (History Museums in the United States: A Critical Assessment), history and the public (Presenting the Past: Essays on History and the Public), history teaching (Experiments in History Teaching), oral history (Government and the Arts in 1930s America), and recent history (A Companion to Post-1945 America). His last book (co-authored with Daniel Cohen and published in 2006) was Digital History: A Guide to Gathering, Preserving, and Presenting the Past on the Web.

Rosensweig was the recipient of a Guggenheim Fellowship and lectured in Australia as a Fulbright Professor. He served as vice-president for research of the American Historical Association from 2003 to 2006.

As founder and director of the Center for History and New Media (CHNM), he was involved in a number of different digital history projects including websites on U.S. history, historical thinking, the French Revolution, the history of science and technology, world history, and the September 11, 2001, attacks. All of these are available through the CHNM web site. In 2011, the center was renamed the Roy Rosenzweig Center for History and New Media in his honor.

Rosenzweig's work in digital history was recognized in 2003 with the Richard W. Lyman Award (awarded by the National Humanities Center and the Rockefeller Foundation) for “outstanding achievement in the use of information technology to advance scholarship and teaching in the humanities.” In 2004 and 2006, he and his colleagues were honored with the American Historical Association's James Harvey Robinson Prize for the sites History Matters and World History Matters.

In June 2006 he published an article about the English Wikipedia in the Journal of American History, "Can History Be Open Source? Wikipedia and the Future of the Past". The article discusses the pros and cons of using Wikipedia as a historical, reliable source and attempts to answer questions on Wikipedia's history and its impact on historical writing.

== Selected bibliography ==
- Rosenzweig, Roy (1983). Eight Hours for What We Will: Workers and Leisure in an Industrial City, 1870–1921. Cambridge and New York: Cambridge University Press.
- Susan Porter Benson (1986). Brier, Stephen; Rosenzweig, Roy (eds.). Presenting the Past: Essays on History and the Public. Critical Perspectives on the Past. Philadelphia: Temple University Press. ISBN 0-87722-406-4.
- Government and the Arts in Thirties America: A Guide to Oral Histories and Other Research Materials. Fairfax, VA: George Mason University Press. 1986. ISBN 0-8026-0002-6.
- Warren, Leon; Rosenzweig, Roy, eds. (1989). History Museums in the United States: A Critical Assessment. Urbana: University of Illinois Press. ISBN 0-252-06064-4.
- Rosenzweig, Roy & Blackmar, Elizabeth (1992). The Park and the People: A History of Central Park. Cornell University Press. ISBN 0-8014-9751-5.
- Brier, Stephen; American Social History Project; Voyager Company; et al. (1994). Who Built America? From the Centennial Celebration of 1876 to the Great War of 1914 (Macintosh version ed.). New York: Voyager. ISBN 1-55940-295-4.
- Rosenzweig, Roy; Thelen, David (1998). The Presence of the Past: Popular Uses of History in American Life. New York: Columbia University Press. ISBN 0-231-11148-7.
- Agnew, Jean-Christophe; Rosenzweig, Roy, eds. (2002). A Companion to Post-1945 America. Blackwell Companions to American History. Malden, MA: Blackwell. ISBN 0-631-22325-8.
- Rosenzweig, Roy. “Scarcity or Abundance? Preserving the Past in a Digital Era.” American Historical Review 108, no. 3 (2003): 735–62. https://doi.org/10.1086/ahr/108.3.735.
- Cohen, Daniel J.; Rosenzweig, Roy (2006). Digital History: A Guide to Gathering, Preserving, and Presenting the Past on the Web. Philadelphia: University of Pennsylvania Press. ISBN 978-0-8122-1923-4.
- Rosenzweig, Roy. (2006) “Can History Be Open Source? Wikipedia and the Future of the Past.” Journal of American History 117–146
- Rosenzweig, Roy (2011). Clio Wired: The Future of the Past in the Digital Age. New York: Columbia University Press. ISBN 978-0-231-15085-9.
