= Omeka =

Digital archiving software

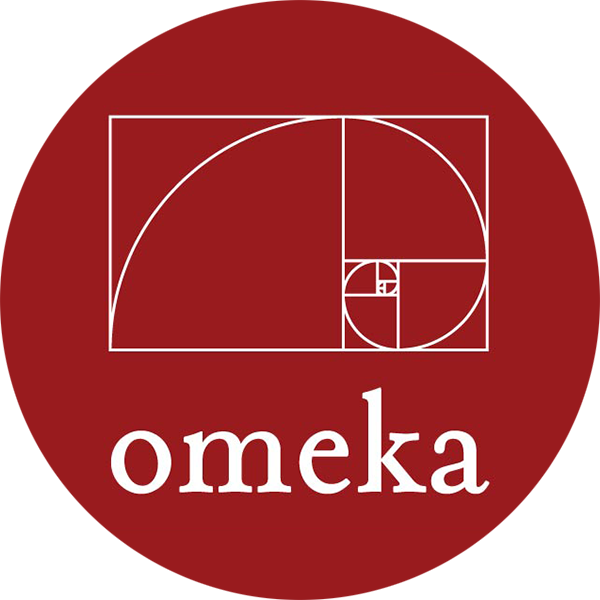
- Developers: Roy Rosenzweig Center for History and New Media (CHNM) at George Mason University (GMU) (2008–2016) Corporation for Digital Scholarship (2016–present)
- Release: February 21, 2008
- Stable release: 3.2 / 2025-08-28[±]
- Written in: PHP
- Operating system: LAMP
- Available in: English, et al.
- Type: Content Management System
- License: GPL-3.0-or-later
- Website: Omeka
- Repository: github.com/omeka/Omeka

Omeka (also known as Omeka Classic) is a free, open-source content management system for online digital collections. As a web application, it allows users to publish and exhibit cultural heritage objects, and extend its functionality with themes and plugins. A lightweight solution in comparison to traditional institutional repository software like DSpace and Fedora, Omeka has a focus on display and uses an unqualified Dublin Core metadata standard.

Its software is currently being used by the Newberry Library, as well as many small museums and historical societies. The Missouri School of Journalism uses Omeka to share their archive of 38,000 photographs from the Pictures of the Year International contest.

Originally developed by the Roy Rosenzweig Center for History and New Media at George Mason University, Omeka was awarded a technology collaboration award by the Andrew Mellon Foundation, and is used to teach curation. Since 2016, the Omeka project has been a project developed by the non-profit Corporation for Digital Scholarship.

In October 2010, the project launched Omeka.net, a hosted web version of the software that does not require server or programming experience. Omeka.net offers five plans, including a free option and four paid tiers, with each plan offering varying amounts of storage and different numbers of sites, themes, and plugins.

In November 2017, the project released Omeka S, a new version of Omeka designed for institutional use, providing the capability to host multiple sites which draw from a common pool of resources, such as Wikidata, in this case through a third-party module. Omeka Classic, the original project, will continue to exist alongside Omeka S with a focus on serving individual projects and educators.

== See also ==
- Dublin Core
