= Roy Rosenzweig Center for History and New Media =

University research center for the study of Digital History

- Established: 1994
- Affiliations: George Mason University
- Location: Fairfax County, Virginia, United States
- Website: rrchnm.org

Roy Rosenzweig Center for History and New Media (RRCHNM), formerly the Center for History and New Media (CHNM), is a research center specializing in digital history and information technology at George Mason University (GMU) in Fairfax County, Virginia. It was one of the first digital history centers in the world, established by Roy Rosenzweig in 1994 to use digital media and information technology to democratize history: to incorporate multiple voices, reach diverse audiences, and encourage popular participation in presenting and preserving the past. As of 2025, its director is Lincoln Mullen.

== History ==
=== Under Roy Rosenzweig ===
CHNM was founded in the fall of 1994 by Roy Rosenzweig as a research center within the GMU Department of History and Art History. Its origins lay in Rosenzweig's work with Steve Brier and Josh Brown on a CD-ROM version of the American Social History Project's American history textbook, Who Built America? but as Rosenzweig was initially the only person at the center, it was located in his office. He was joined in 1995 by Michael O'Malley, who became the center's Associate Director, and then-PhD-student Elena Razlogova, who became the center's first paid staff member. During office moves in 1997, the center expanded to two offices connected by a lobby with the department's computers and printer. In 1999, it secured a challenge grant from the National Endowment for the Humanities (NEH) which allowed it to establish an endowment in support of the center. This was followed in 2000 by a grant from the Alfred Sloan Foundation, which led to a major expansion of center personnel and its relocating to its own space, separate from the department.

=== Renaming ===
In 2007, Rosenzweig died of cancer at the age of only 57. Dan Cohen succeeded him as director and a second NEH challenge grant to build the center endowment provided the opportunity to rename the center in his honor. On April 15, 2011, the Center for History and New Media became the Roy Rosenzweig Center for History and New Media.

=== After Roy Rosenzweig ===
In 2013, Cohen left the center to become the founding executive director of the Digital Public Library of America and was succeeded as director by Stephen Robertson.

In 2018, The Chronicle of Higher Education released a report on the top universities to receive funding from the NEH over the past years. George Mason had the eighth highest funding amount nationwide, with 61% of that funding awarded to RRCHNM. As the center is administratively part of the Department of History and Art History, the department considered by itself would have ranked at number thirteen on the nationwide list.

In 2019, Robertson left the center and was succeeded as director by T. Mills Kelly.

As of 2023, the director is Lincoln Mullen.

== Open educational resources ==
The center's first projects were aimed at K-12 teachers and students and this remains a significant strand of work done at the center to the present day. With funding from the National Endowment for the Humanities (NEH), Rosenzweig continued work on the Who Built America? CD-ROMs before he transitioned to the then-new world wide web. Early online projects included Liberty, Equality, Fraternity, a history of the French Revolution; History Matters, for use in American history survey courses; and World History Sources and Women in World History for use in world history survey courses. Other high profile NEH-funded projects include T. Mills Kelly's Making the History of 1989, created in collaboration with the German Historical Institute, and Kelly Schrum's Children and Youth in History, created in collaboration with the University of Missouri-Kansas City.

In 2002, the center began to receive a series of grants from the US Department of Education's Teaching American History program, including a five year, $7 million grant to build an American history clearinghouse website in 2007. Survey results released by the American Historical Association in 2024 concluded this website remains one of the top 10 free resources on American history used by US high school teachers. The center also worked directly with school systems and cultural heritage institutes to create pedagogical materials ranging from lesson plans to digital archives of primary sources. One such project on historical thinking, Object of History, was created in partnership with the Smithsonian Institution's National Museum of American History.

Its recent educational projects have focused on re-developing its open educational resources about world history. One of its newest projects, in conjunction with the National Museum of American Diplomacy, involves the creation of three historical diplomacy classroom simulations for secondary education instructors. The center is also involved with educational outreach with teachers in Virginia school districts.

In keeping with the center's commitment to democratize history, all web-based projects are open educational resources.

== Digital collecting ==
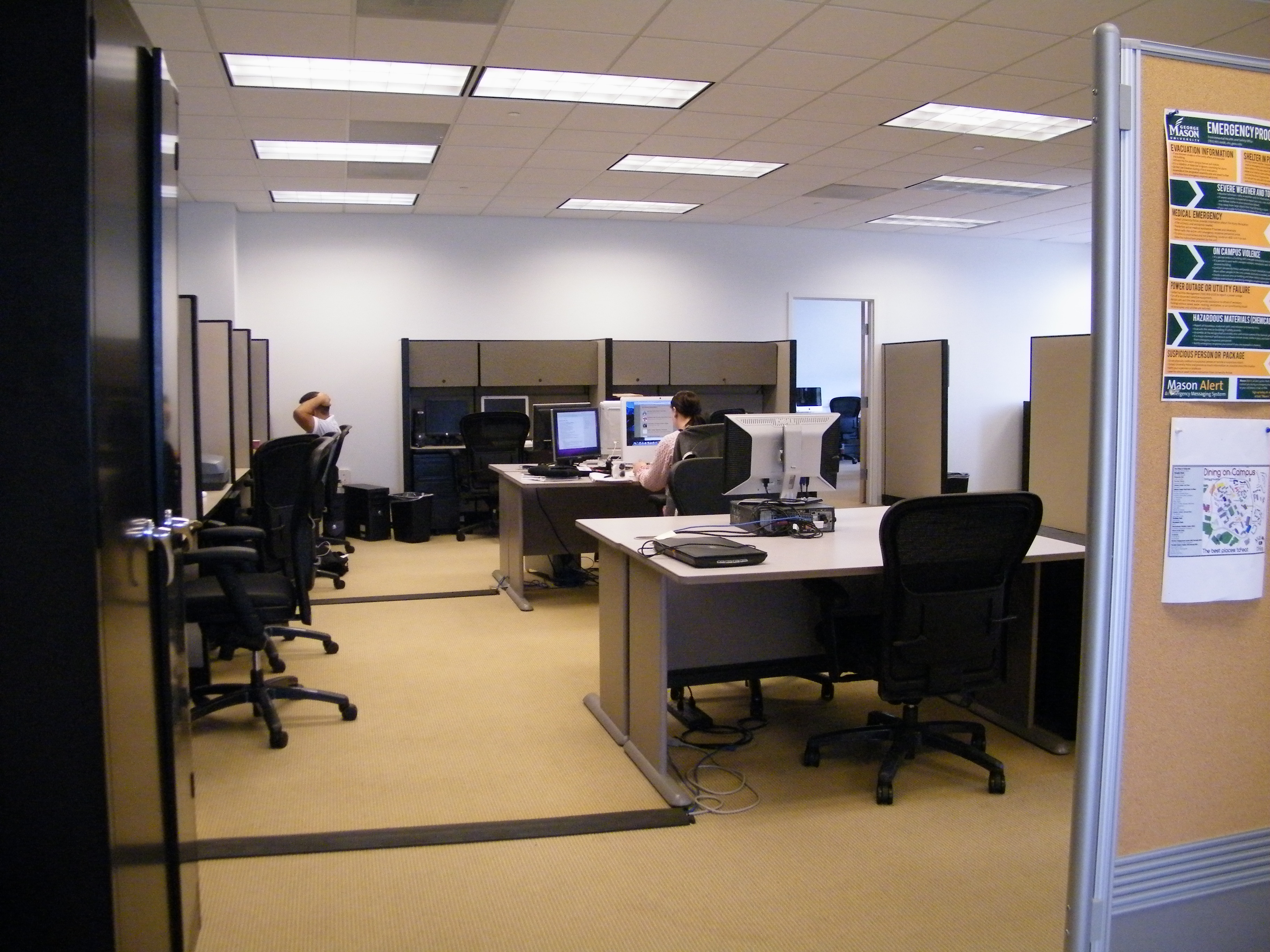
Center for History and New Media Offices

Following the September 11, 2001 attacks, the center in partnership with the American Social History Project at the City University of New York organized the September 11 Digital Archive with funding from the Alfred P. Sloan Foundation. With the September 11 Digital Archive, CHNM and ASHP utilized electronic media to collect, preserve, and present the past, with a digital repository of material including more than 150,000 first-hand accounts, emails, images, and other digital materials. It became the Library of Congress' first major digital acquisition.

This project inspired the Hurricane Digital Memory Bank, which collected stories and digital objects related to the Hurricane Katrina, Rita, and Wilma. The center also collaborated with the Jewish Women's Archive on Katrina's Jewish Voices, a virtual archive of stories, images, and reflections about the New Orleans and Gulf Coast Jewish communities before and after Hurricane Katrina.

The desire to avoid creating collecting websites from scratch each time a new collecting project began led the center to develop Omeka, which was first released in 2008. It continues to use Omeka to power its collecting projects, including recent projects on the COVID-19 pandemic, Pandemic Religion and Collecting these Times.

== Software development ==
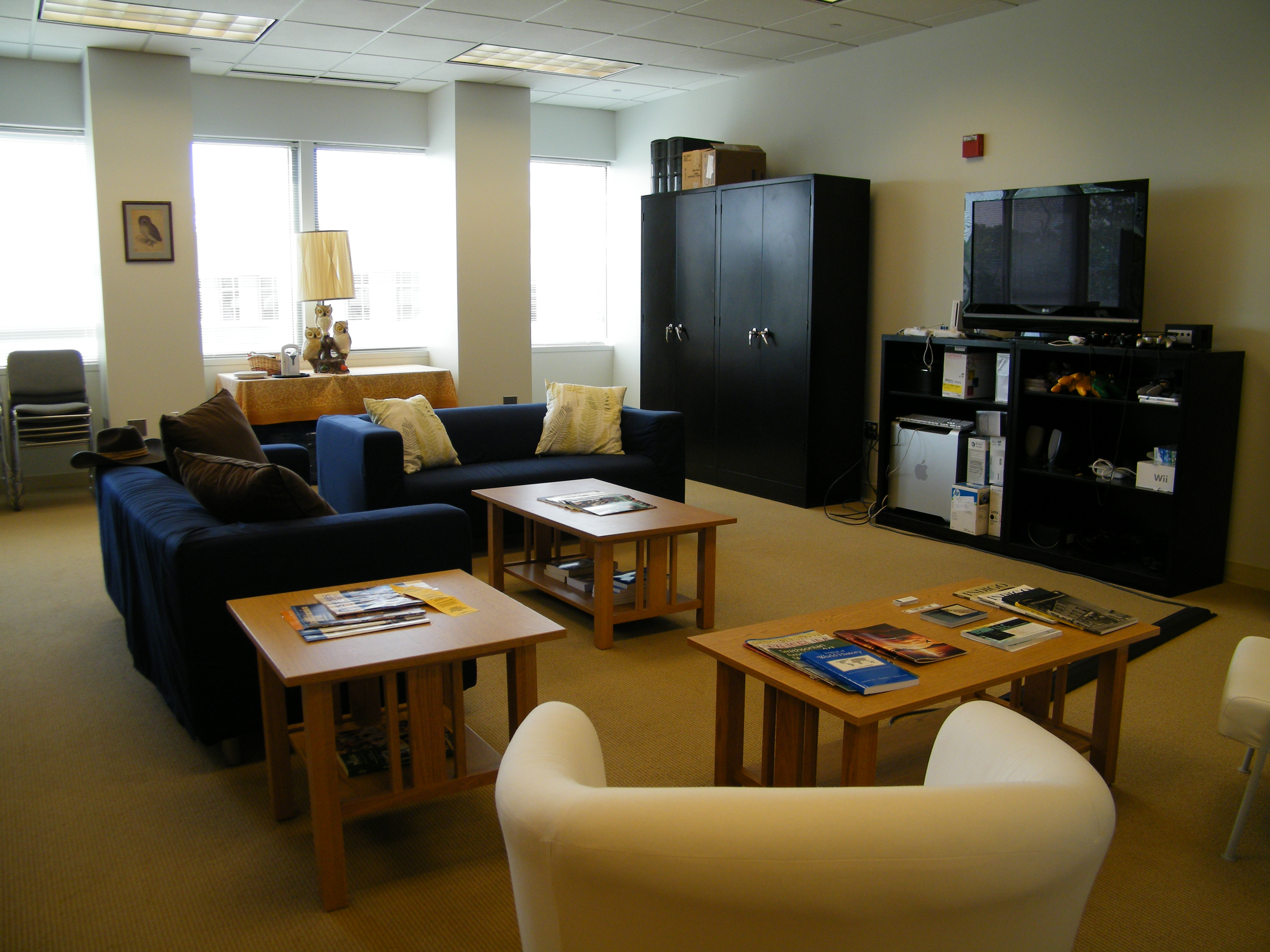
Community area of the center

In 2005, the center began to develop its own free and open-source software.

With funding from the Institute for Museum and Library Services (IMLS) and the Andrew W. Mellon Foundation, the center developed Zotero, a free browser-based reference management software which is used by academics to read and cite the academic literature. This led to Thomson Reuters, the makers of the commercial reference management software EndNote, suing George Mason University and the Commonwealth of Virginia in 2008; the lawsuit was dismissed in 2009.

The IMLS also provided initial funding in 2007 for Omeka, a content management system that uses the Dublin Core metadata standard to build digital collections and publish digital exhibits. With funding from the NEH, the center also built the Scripto and DataScribe transcription modules on top of the Omeka platform.

During the 2000s and early 2010s, the center distributed a series of digital tools for historians and teachers, including Web Scrapbook, Survey Builder, Scribe (a note taking application designed with historians in mind), Poll Builder, H-Bot (an automated historical fact finder), and Syllabus Finder, which allowed users to find and compare syllabi from thousands of universities and colleges on any topic, using the Google search engine. By the late 2010s, these tools were largely superseded by other free or freemium software by various corporations so the tools were discontinued.

In 2017, with financial support of the Andrew W. Mellon Foundation, the center released Tropy, a desktop knowledge organization application to manage and describe photographs of research materials.

Starting in 2015, the maintenance and development of center software was shared between RRCHNM and the Corporation for Digital Scholarship (CDS), which is run by former members of the center. In February 2021, RRCHNM announced that the projects Tropy, Omeka, and Zotero were in the process of being transitioned entirely to CDS.

== Scholarly communication ==
In 1999, American Quarterly collaborated with the American Studies Crossroads Project and the center to organize an experiment in hypertext publishing. Four essays, covering such diverse topics as photos, as legal evidence, the Spanish–American War in film, early comic strips, and Arnold Schwarzenegger, offer contrasting approaches to using digital media for scholarly presentations. Other early experiments in digital publishing include Imaging the French Revolution, a series of essays analyzing images of crowds in the French Revolution and Interpreting the Declaration of Independence by Translation, a roundtable of historians brought together to discuss the translation and reception of the Declaration of Independence in Japan, Mexico, Russia, China, Poland, Italy, Germany, Spain, and Israel.

In 2009, the center began to focus more on scholarly communication and community-building projects. Particularly notable projects from this era of the center included the NEH-funded One Week One Tool Summer Institutes; NEH-funded Doing Digital History workshops for mid-career American historians; the Mellon-funded THATCamp unconferences; and the Sloan-funded PressForward, a WordPress plugin for online scholarly communication. The PressForward project, in particular, led to the establishment of several experimental publications including The Journal of Digital Humanities, which ran from 2011 to 2014, and Digital Humanities Now, which ran from 2009 to 2021.

In 2017, the center held a Mellon-funded workshop to explore the role of argument in digital history scholarship. It subsequently published a whitepaper, "Argument and Digital History" and ran a panel on it at the American Historical Association Annual Meeting.

== Public history ==
Many of the center's projects are public history projects with an explicit focus on broad, public audiences.

After Rosenzweig's death, Tom Scheinfeldt finished the creation of Gulag: Many Days, Many Lives, a web-based exhibit funded by NEH and developed in collaboration with the Gulag Museum in Perm, Russia, that provides "an in-depth look into the life in the Gulag" via documentaries and witness accounts.

Another high profile public project is Sheila Brennan and Sharon Leon's Histories of the National Mall, a website optimized for mobile viewing that allows visitors to the National Mall to view its history onsite. The website won the National Council on Public History's award for outstanding public history projects in 2015.

Hosted at the center until 2017, History News Network features articles, placing current events in historical perspective, written by historians of all political persuasions.

== Computational history ==
One of Rosenzweig's last NEH grants, continued by Cohen after his death, was to research, develop, and test tools for text mining. Recent projects in the area of computational history include Sheila Brennan and Lincoln Mullen's NEH-funded Mapping American Elections; Lincoln Mullen's American Public Bible, which builds on the Library of Congress' Chronicling America collection; and Jessica Otis' National Science Foundation funded Death by Numbers, on the early modern London bills of mortality.

== R2 Studios ==
CHNM began podcasting in 2007 with the Digital Campus TV project. In 2021, with funding from the Andrew W. Mellon Foundation, it formally created a podcasting division known as R2 Studios. Recent podcasts include Abigail Mullen's Consolation Prize, which focuses on the history of early American consuls, Kelly's The Green Tunnel, which focuses on the 100 years of history of the Appalachian Trail, and James Ambuske's Worlds Turned Upside Down on the American Revolution.

== See also ==
- Corporation for Digital Scholarship
- National History Education Clearinghouse
- Omeka
- Tropy
- Zotero
