= Panthéon =

National mausoleum in Paris

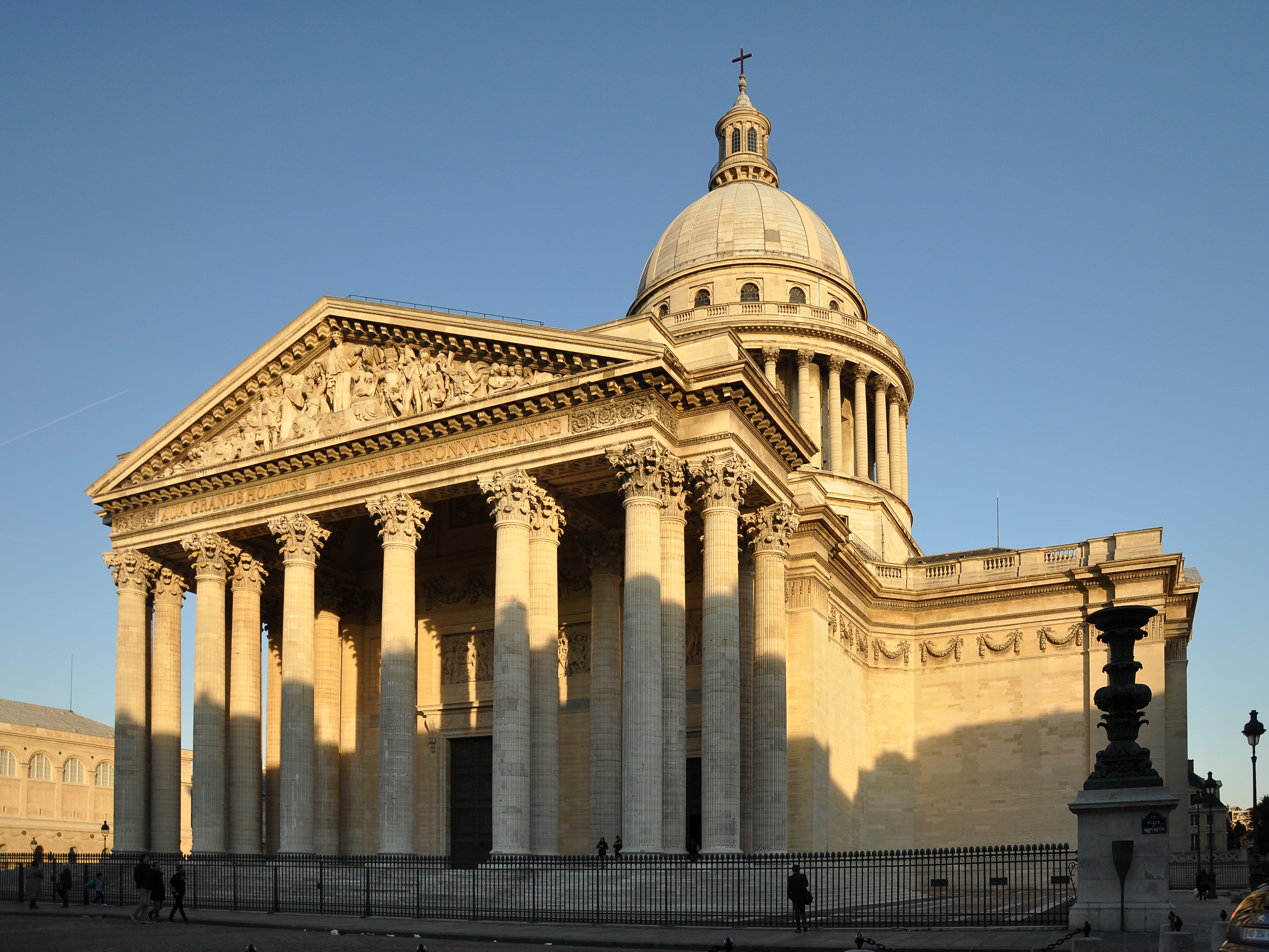
- Former names: Église Sainte-Geneviève

General information
- Type: Mausoleum
- Architectural style: Neoclassicism
- Location: Place du Panthéon; Paris, France
- Coordinates: 48°50′46″N 2°20′45″E
- Construction started: 1758
- Completed: 1790

Design and construction
- Architects: Jacques-Germain Soufflot; Jean-Baptiste Rondelet

Website
- https://www.paris-pantheon.fr/en/

Monument historique
- Designated: 1920
- Reference no.: PA00088420

The Panthéon (French: [pɑ̃.te.ɔ̃], from Ancient Greek πάνθειον (pántheion) '[temple] to all the gods') is a monument in the 5th arrondissement of Paris, France. It stands in the Latin Quarter (Quartier Latin), on the Montagne Sainte-Geneviève, in the centre of the Place du Panthéon, which was named after it. The edifice was built between 1758 and 1790, from designs by Jacques-Germain Soufflot, at the behest of King Louis XV; the king intended it as a church dedicated to Saint Genevieve, Paris's patron saint, whose relics were to be housed in the church. Neither Soufflot nor Louis XV lived to see the church completed.

By the time the construction was finished, the French Revolution had started; the National Constituent Assembly voted in 1791 to transform the Church of Saint Genevieve into a mausoleum for the remains of distinguished French citizens, modelled on the Pantheon in Rome which had been used in this way since the 17th century. The first panthéonisé was Honoré Gabriel Riqueti, comte de Mirabeau, although his remains were removed from the building a few years later. The Panthéon was twice restored to church usage in the course of the 19th century—although Soufflot's remains were transferred inside it in 1829—until the French Third Republic finally decreed the building's exclusive use as a mausoleum in 1881. The placement of Victor Hugo's remains in the crypt in 1885 was its first entombment in over 50 years.

The successive changes in the Panthéon's purpose resulted in modifications of the pedimental sculptures and the capping of the dome by a cross or a flag; some of the originally existing windows were blocked up with masonry in order to give the interior a darker and more funereal atmosphere, which compromised somewhat Soufflot's initial attempt at combining the lightness and brightness of the Gothic cathedral with classical principles. The architecture of the Panthéon is an early example of Neoclassicism, surmounted by a dome that owes some of its character to Bramante's Tempietto.

In 1851, Léon Foucault conducted a demonstration of diurnal motion at the Panthéon by suspending a pendulum from the ceiling, a copy of which is still visible today. As of December 2021 the remains of 81 people (75 men and six women) had been transferred to the Panthéon. More than half of all the panthéonisations were made under Napoleon's rule during the First Empire.

== History ==
=== Site and earlier buildings ===
The site of the Panthéon had great significance in the history of Paris, and was occupied by a series of monuments. It was on Mount Lucotitius, a height on the Left Bank where the forum of the Roman town of Lutetia was located. It was also the original burial site of Saint Genevieve, who had led the resistance to the Huns when they threatened Paris in 451. In 508, Clovis, King of the Franks, constructed a church there, where he and his wife were later buried in 511 and 545. The church, originally dedicated to Saints Peter and Paul, was rededicated to Saint Genevieve, who became the patron saint of Paris. It was at the centre of the Abbey of Saint Genevieve, a centre of religious scholarship in the Middle Ages. Her relics were kept in the church, and were brought out for solemn processions when dangers threatened the city.

=== Construction ===
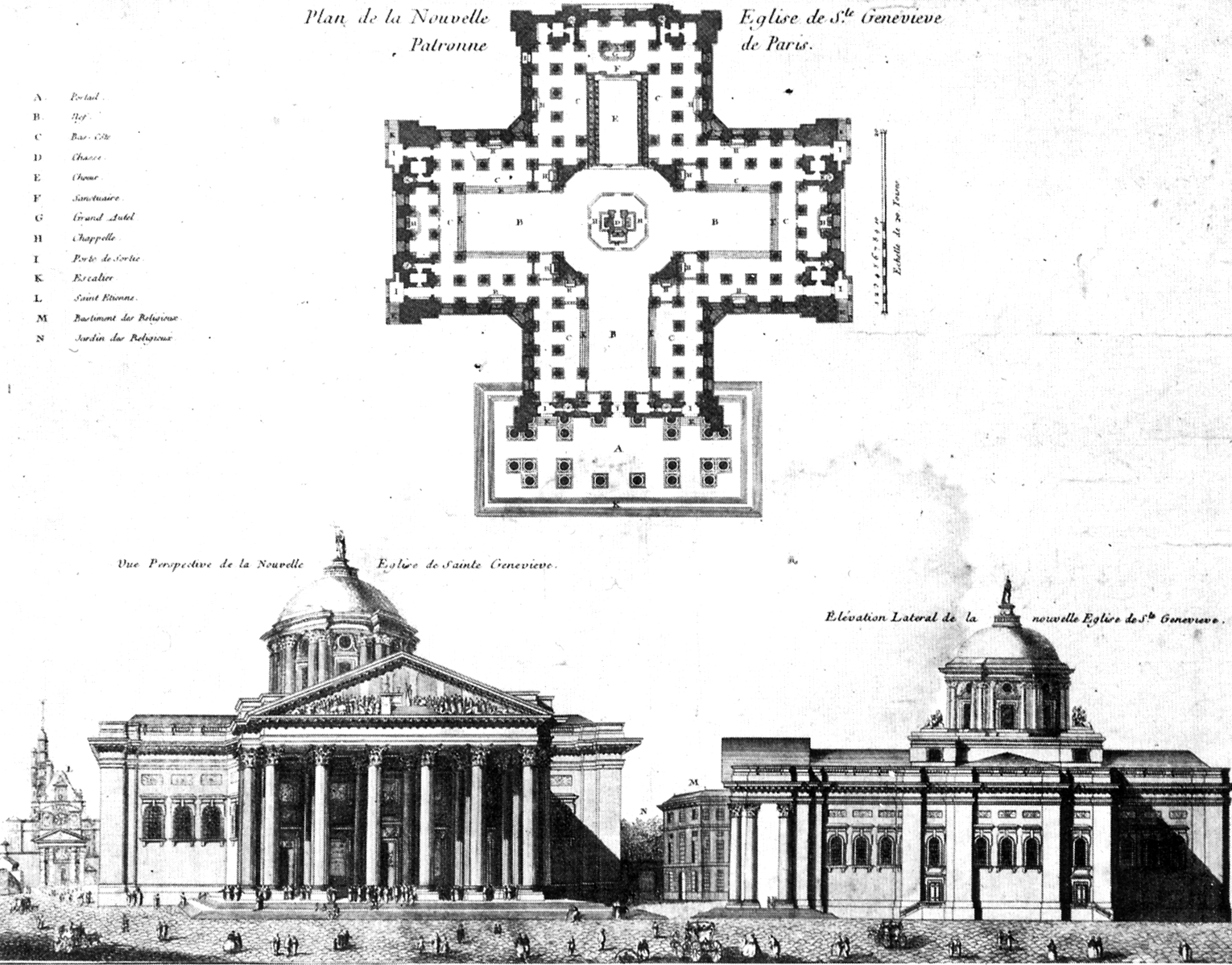
Soufflot's original plan for the Church of Sainte Genevieve (1756)

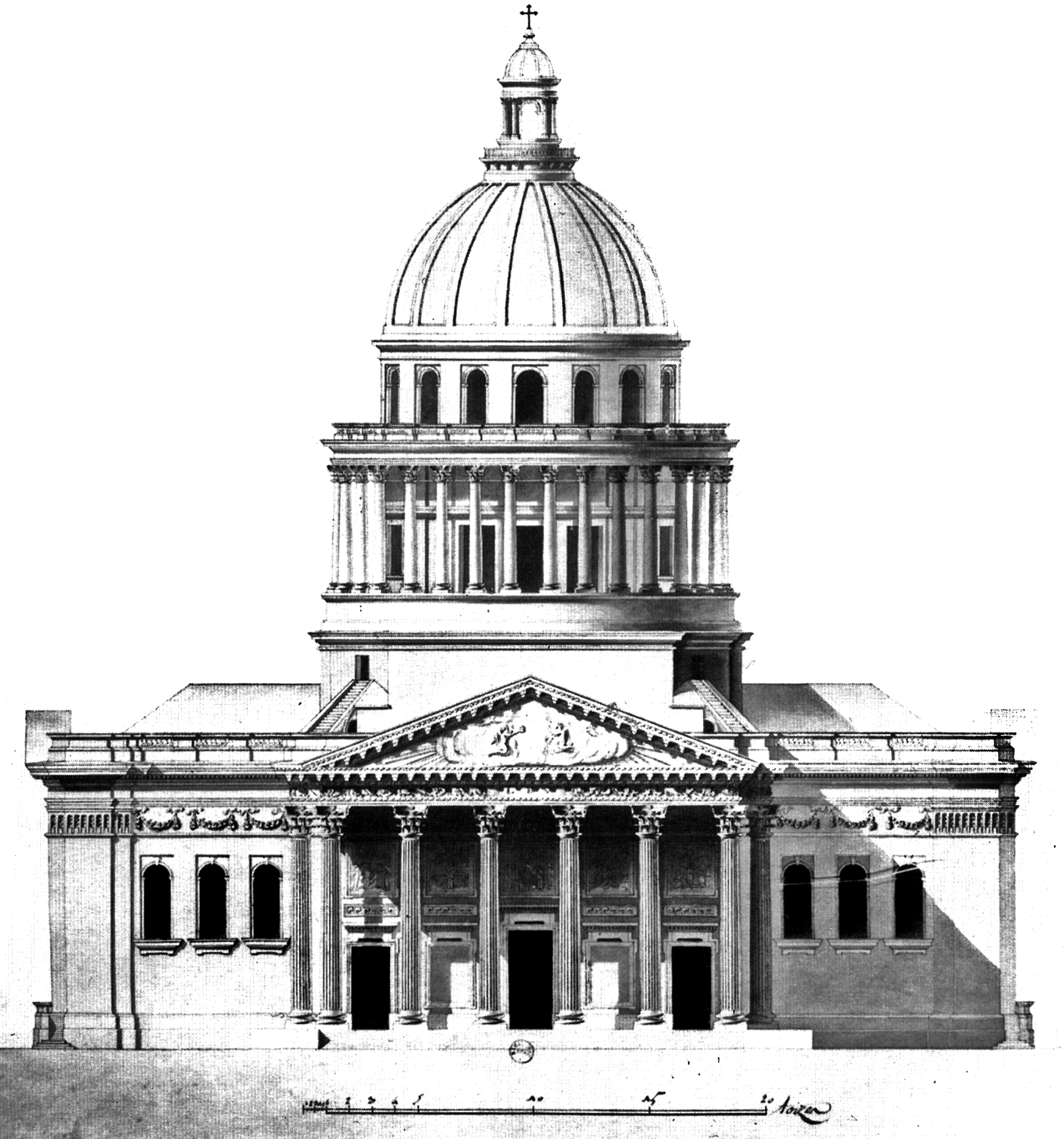
Soufflot's final plan: the principal façade (1777)

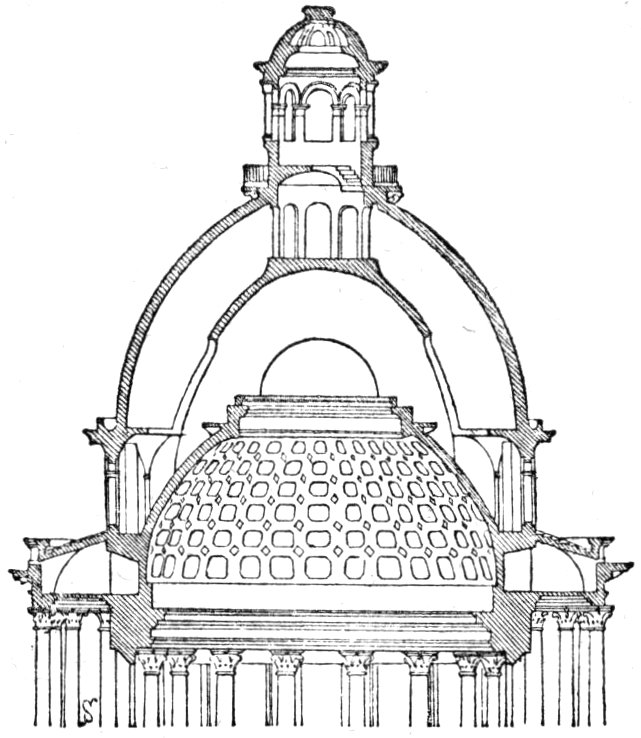
Soufflot's plan of the three domes, one within another

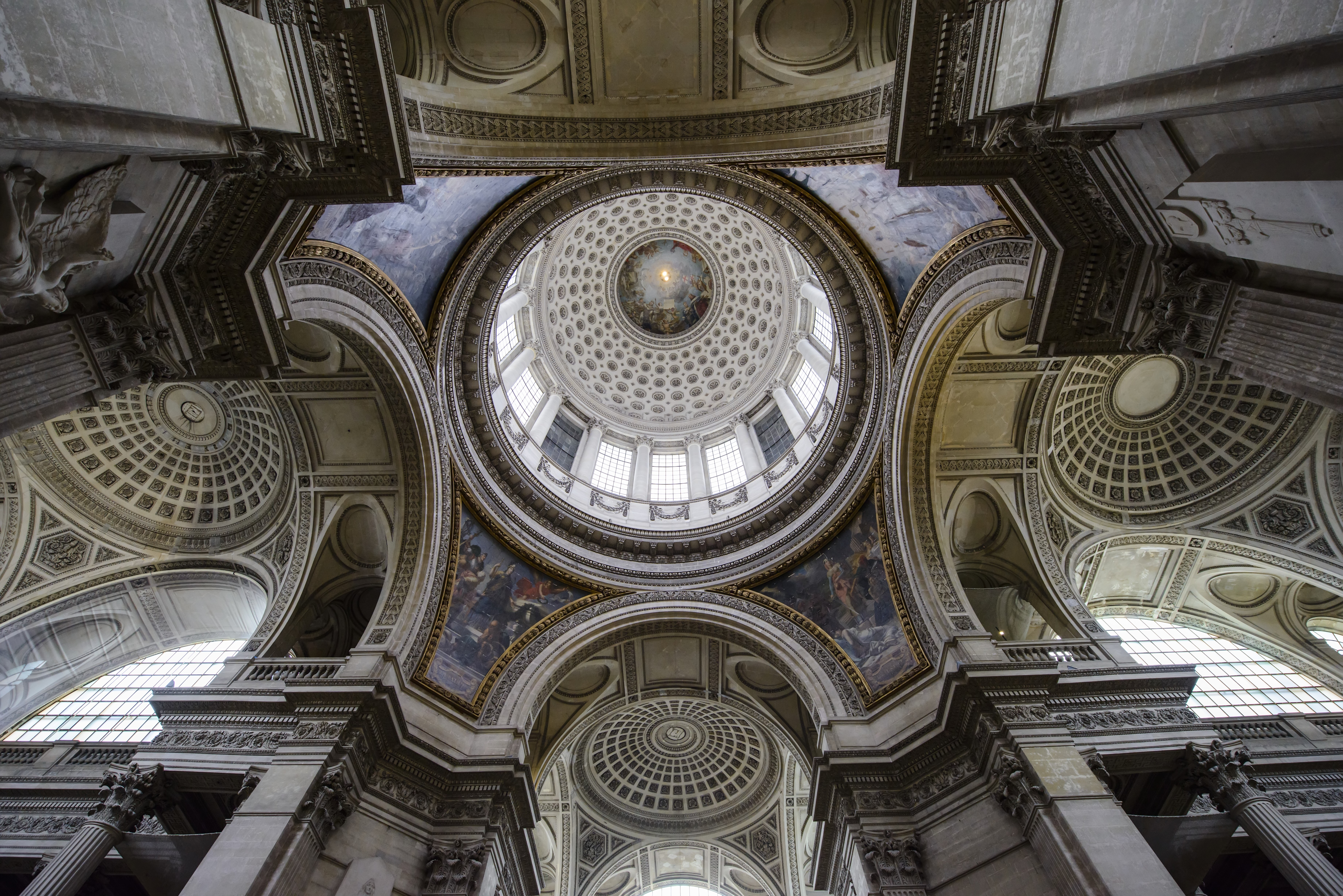
Looking upward at the first and second domes

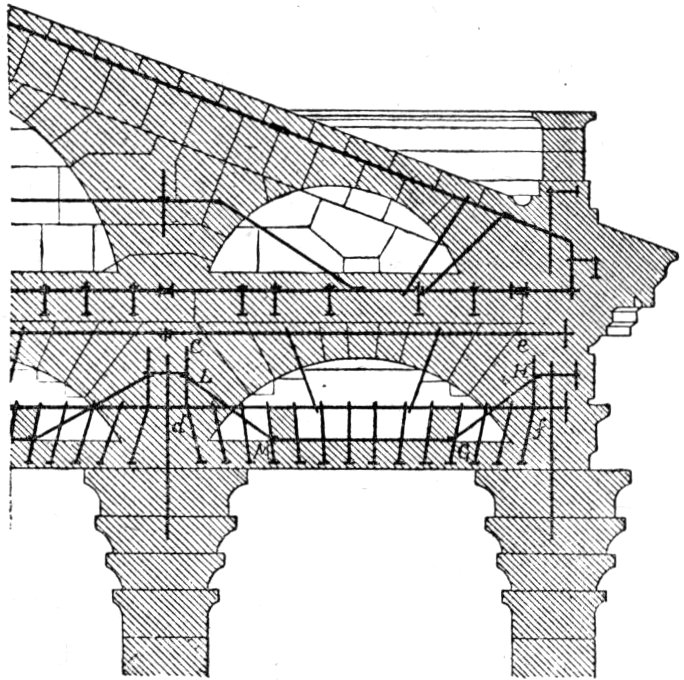
Iron rods were used to give greater strength and stability to the stone structure (1758–90)

King Louis XV vowed in 1744 that if he recovered from his illness he would replace the dilapidated church of the Abbey of St Genevieve with a grander building worthy of the patron saint of Paris. He did recover, but ten years passed before the reconstruction and enlargement of the church was begun. In 1755 the director of the King's public works, Abel-François Poisson, marquis de Marigny, chose Jacques-Germain Soufflot to design the church. Soufflot (1713–1780) had studied classical architecture in Rome over 1731–38. Most of his early work was done in Lyon. Saint Genevieve became his life's work; it was not finished until after his death.

His first design was completed in 1755, and was clearly influenced by the work of Bramante, which he had studied in Italy. It took form of a Greek cross, with four naves of equal length, and monumental dome over the crossing in the centre, and a classical portico with Corinthian columns and a peristyle with a triangular pediment on the main façade. The design was modified five times over the following years, with the addition of a narthex, a choir, and two towers. The design was not finalised until 1777.

The foundations were laid in 1758, but due to economic problems work proceeded slowly. In 1780, Soufflot died and was replaced by his student Jean-Baptiste Rondelet. The re-modelled Abbey of St. Genevieve was finally completed in 1790, shortly after the beginning of the French Revolution.

The building is 110 metres long by 84 metres wide, and 83 metres high, with the crypt beneath of the same size. The ceiling was supported by isolated columns, which supported an array of barrel vaults and transverse arches. The massive dome was supported by pendentives rested upon four massive pillars. Critics of the plan contended that the pillars could not support such a large dome. Soufflot strengthened the stone structure with a system of iron rods, a predecessor of modern reinforced buildings. The bars had deteriorated by the 21st century, and a major restoration project to replace them was carried out between 2010 and 2020.

The dome is actually three domes, fitting within each other. The first, lowest dome, has a coffered ceiling with rosettes, and is open in the centre. Looking through this dome, the second dome is visible, decorated with the fresco The Apotheosis of Saint Genevieve by Antoine Gros. The outermost dome, visible from the outside, is built of stone bound together with iron cramps and covered with lead sheathing, rather than of carpentry construction, as was the common French practice of the period. Concealed buttresses inside the walls give additional support to the dome.

=== The Revolution – The "Temple of the Nation" ===
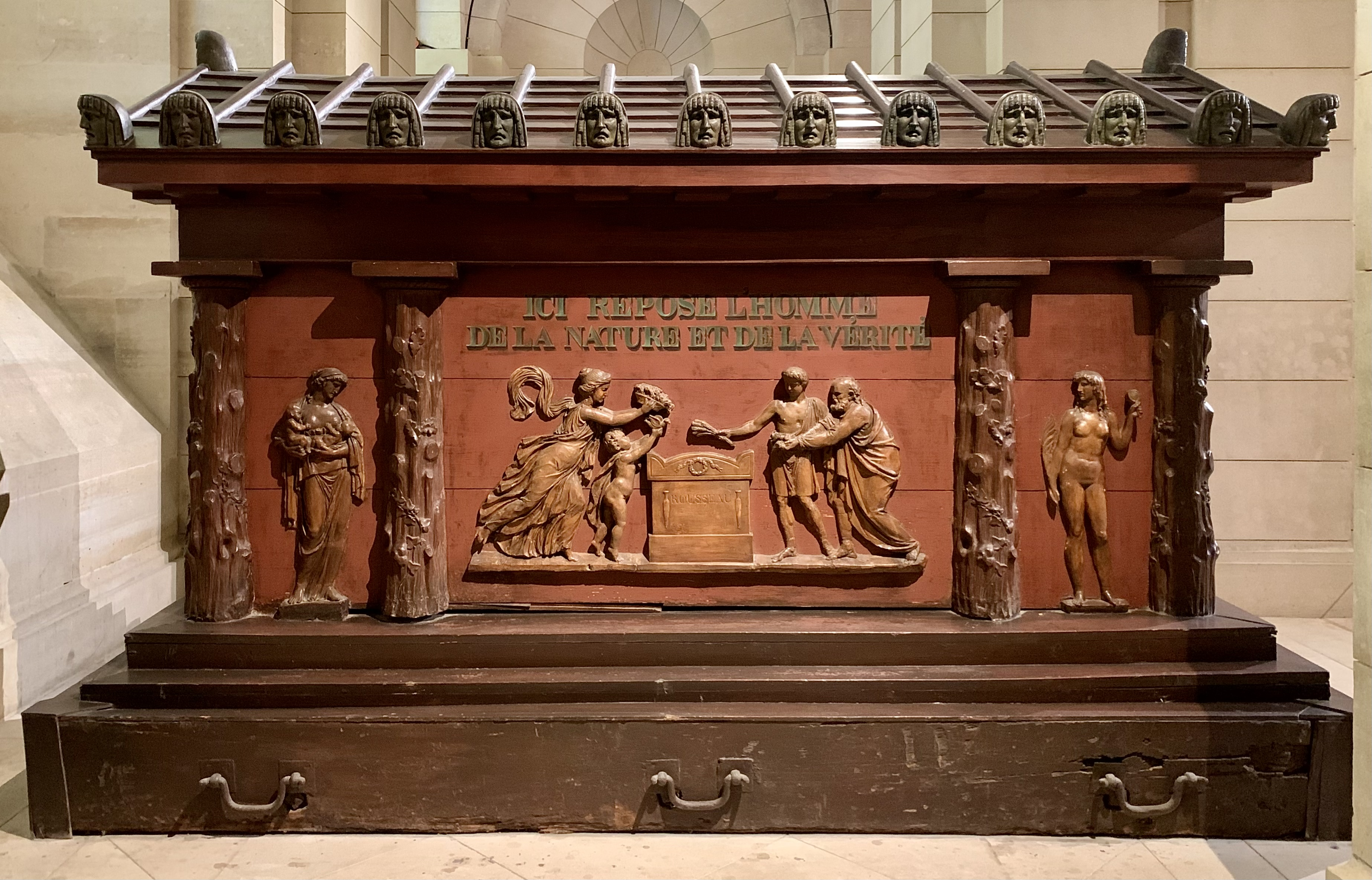
The Tomb of Jean-Jacques Rousseau

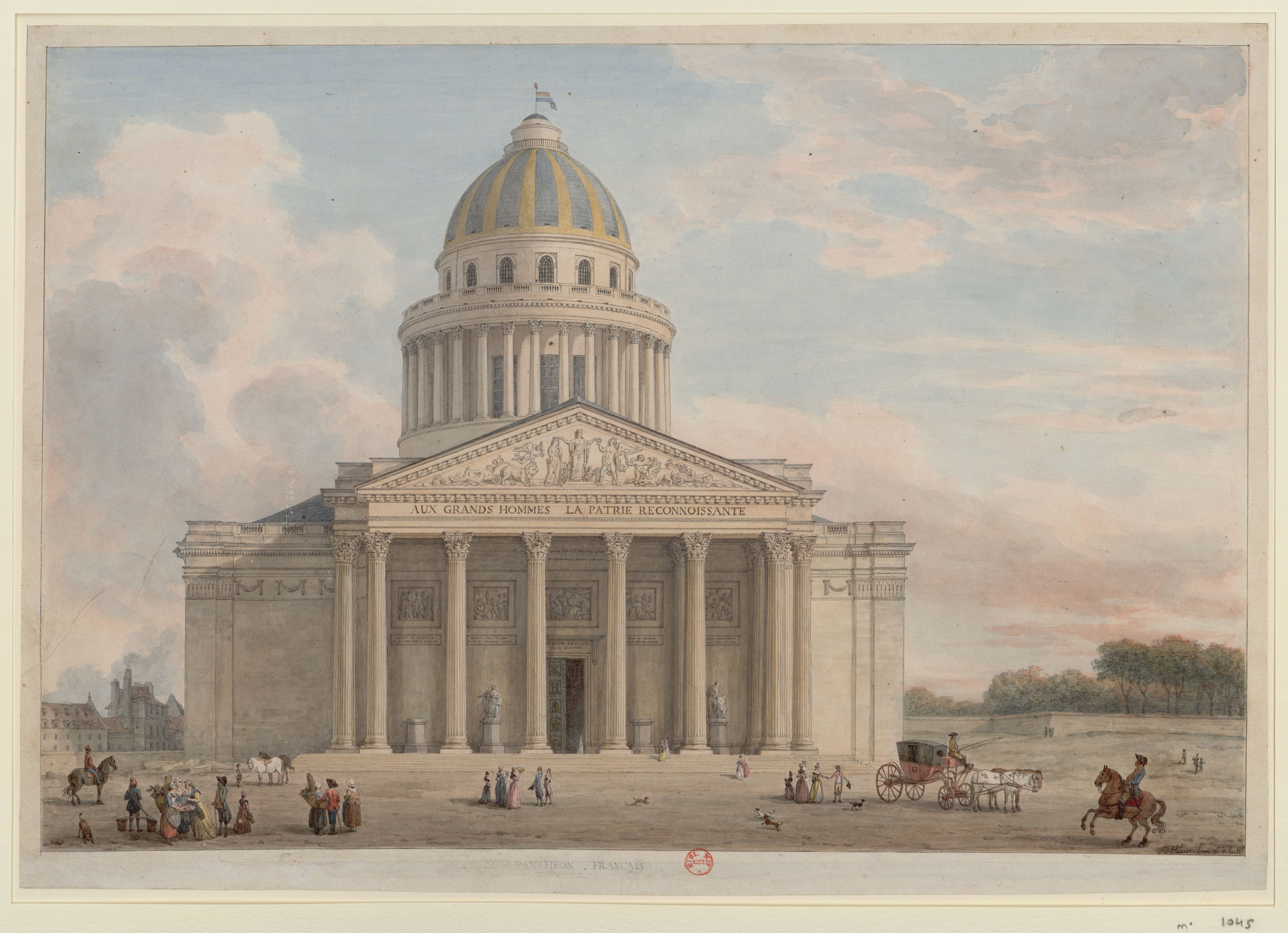
The Panthéon in 1795. The façade windows were bricked up to make the interior darker and more solemn.

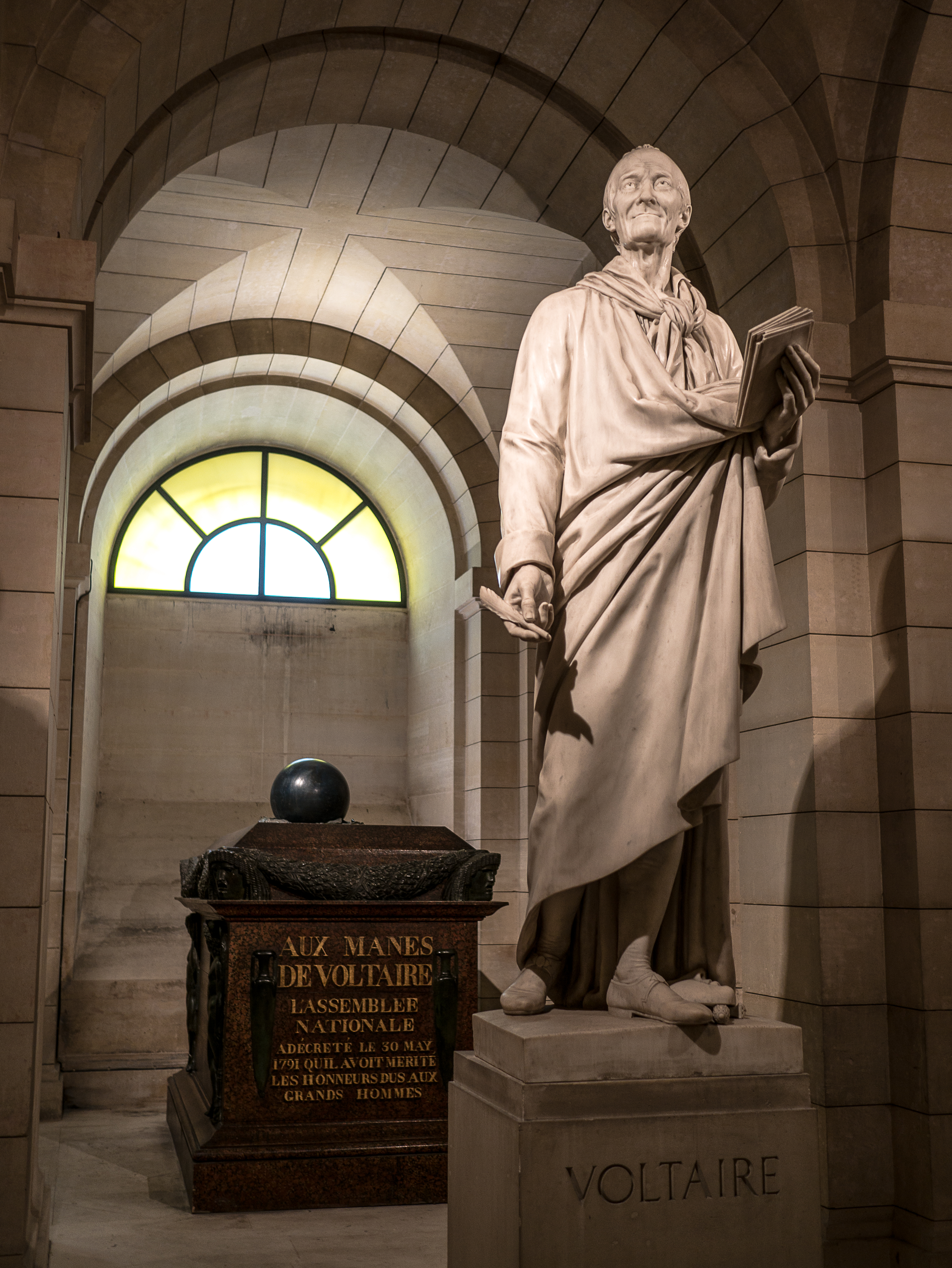
Tomb and statue of Voltaire

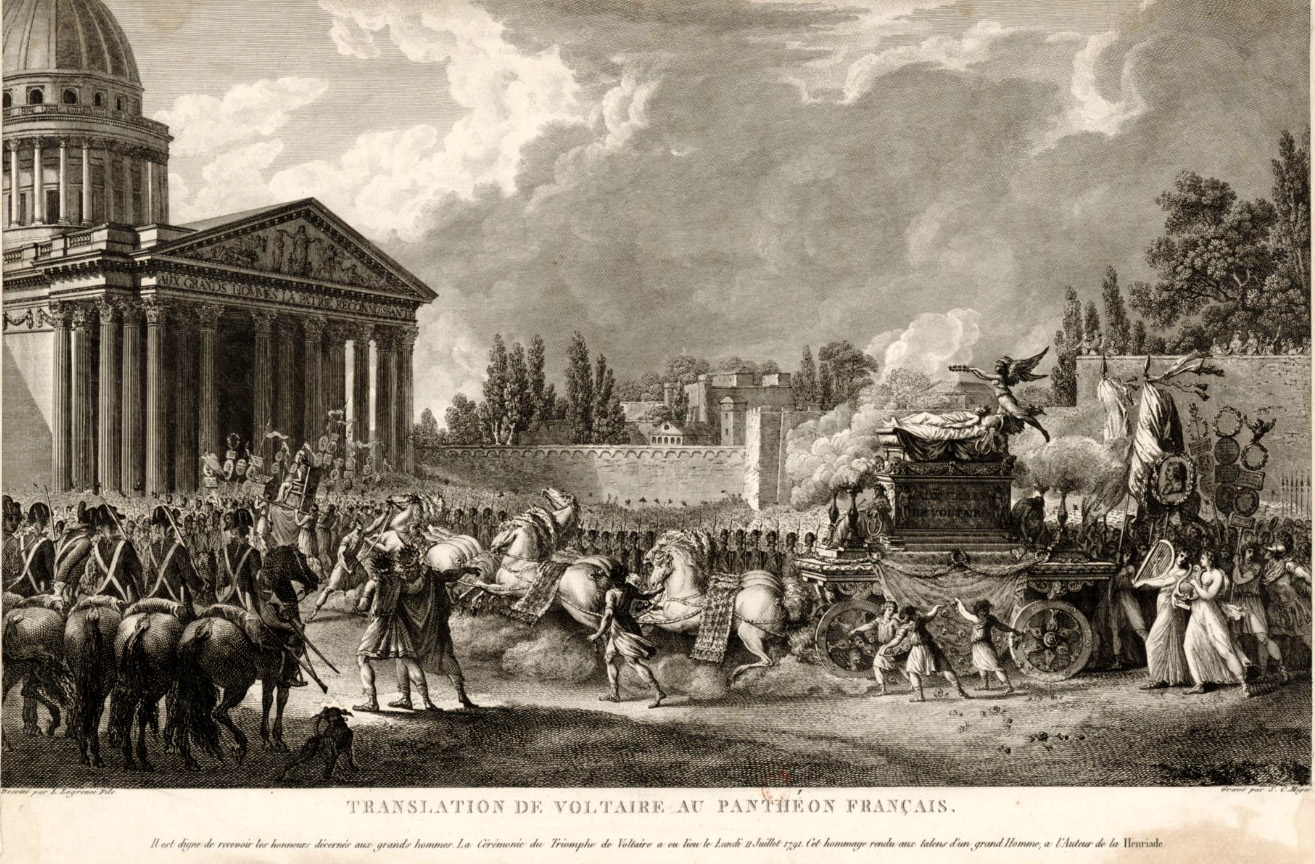
Transfer of ashes of Voltaire to the Pantheon (1791)

The Church of Saint Genevieve was nearly complete, with only the interior decoration unfinished, when the French Revolution began in 1789. In 1790, the Marquis de Vilette proposed that it be made a temple devoted to liberty, on the model of the Pantheon in Rome. "Let us install statues of our great men and lay their ashes to rest in its underground recesses." The idea was formally adopted in April, 1791, after the death of the prominent revolutionary figure, The Comte de Mirabeau, the President of the National Constituent Assembly on April 2, 1791. On April 4, 1791, the Assembly decreed "that this religious church become a temple of the nation, that the tomb of a great man become the altar of liberty." They also approved a new text over the entrance: "A grateful nation honors its great men." On the same day the declaration was approved, the funeral of Mirabeau was held in the church.

The ashes of Voltaire were placed in the Panthéon in a lavish ceremony on 11 July 1791, followed by the remains of several revolutionaries, including Jean-Paul Marat, replacing Mirabeau, and of the philosopher Jean-Jacques Rousseau. In the rapid shifts of power of the Revolutionary period, two of the first men honored in Pantheon, Mirabeau and Marat, were declared enemies of the Revolution, and their remains were removed. Finally, the new government of the French Convention decreed in February, 1795, that no one should be placed in the Pantheon who had not been dead at least ten years.

Soon after the church was transformed into a mausoleum, the Assembly approved architectural changes to make the interior darker and more solemn. The architect Quatremère de Quincy bricked up the lower windows and frosted the glass of the upper windows to reduce the light, and removed most of the ornament from the exterior. The architectural lanterns and bells were removed from the façade. All of the religious friezes and statues were destroyed in 1791; it was replaced by statuary and murals on patriotic themes.

=== Temple to church and back to temple (1806–1830) ===
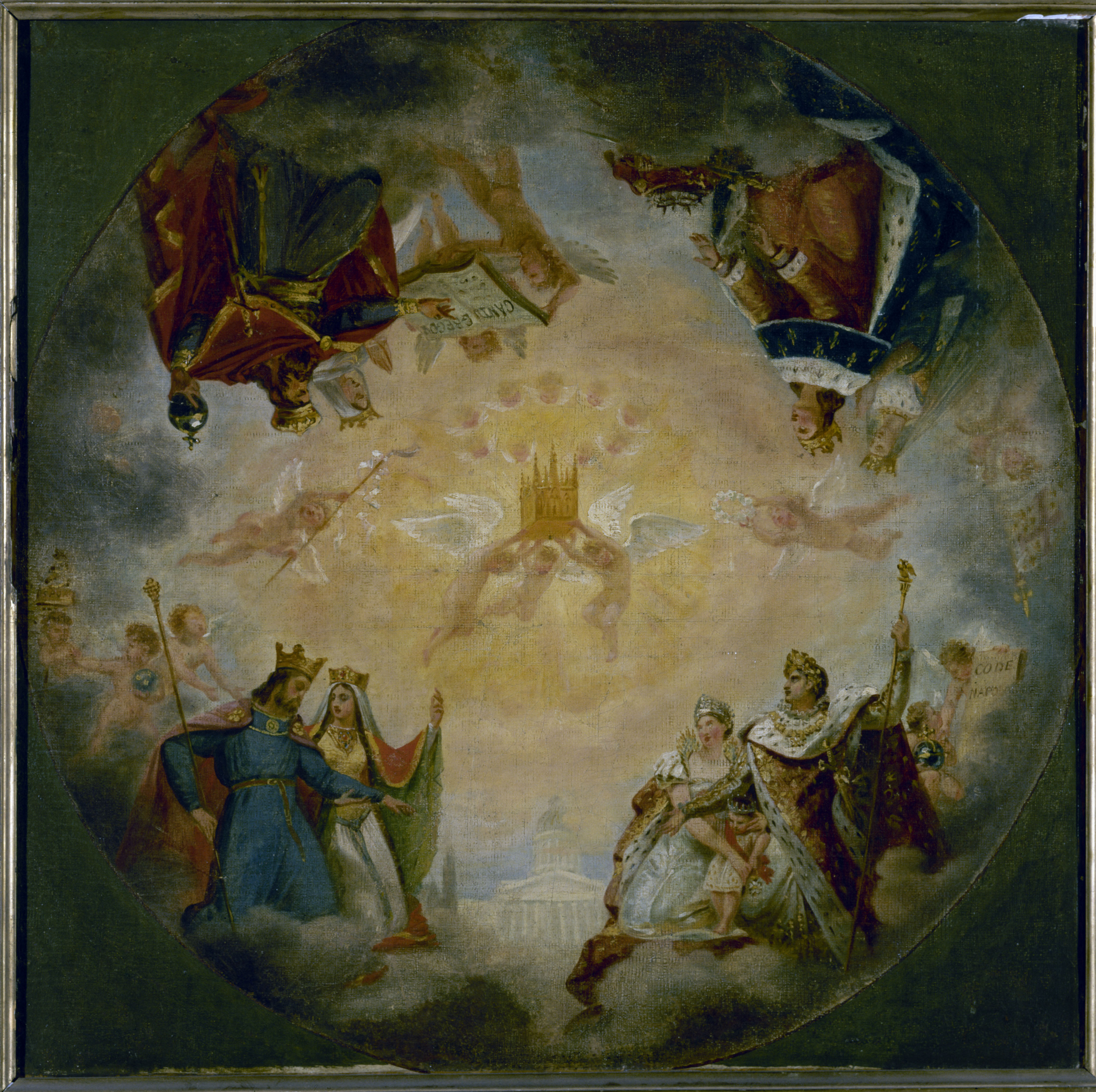
Design for the cupola by Antoine-Jean Gros (1812). Napoleon is at the bottom right. (Now in the Carnavalet Museum).

Napoleon Bonaparte, when he became First Consul in 1801, signed a Concordat with the Pope, agreeing to restore former church properties, including the Panthéon. The Panthéon was under the jurisdiction of the canons of the Cathedral of Notre Dame de Paris. Celebrations of important events, such as the victory of Napoleon at the Battle of Austerlitz, were held there. However, the crypt of the church kept its official function as the resting place for illustrious Frenchmen. A new entrance directly to the crypt was created via the eastern porch (1809–1811). The artist Antoine-Jean Gros was commissioned to decorate the interior of the cupola. It combined the secular and religious aspects of the church; it showed The Apotheosis of Saint Genevieve, conducted to heaven by angels, in the presence of great leaders of France, from Clovis I and Charlemagne to Napoleon and the Empress Josephine.

During the reign of Napoleon, the remains of forty-one illustrious Frenchmen were placed in the crypt. They were mostly military officers, senators and other high officials of the Empire, but also included the explorer Louis-Antoine de Bougainville and the painter Joseph-Marie Vien, the teacher of Napoleon's official painter, Jacques-Louis David.

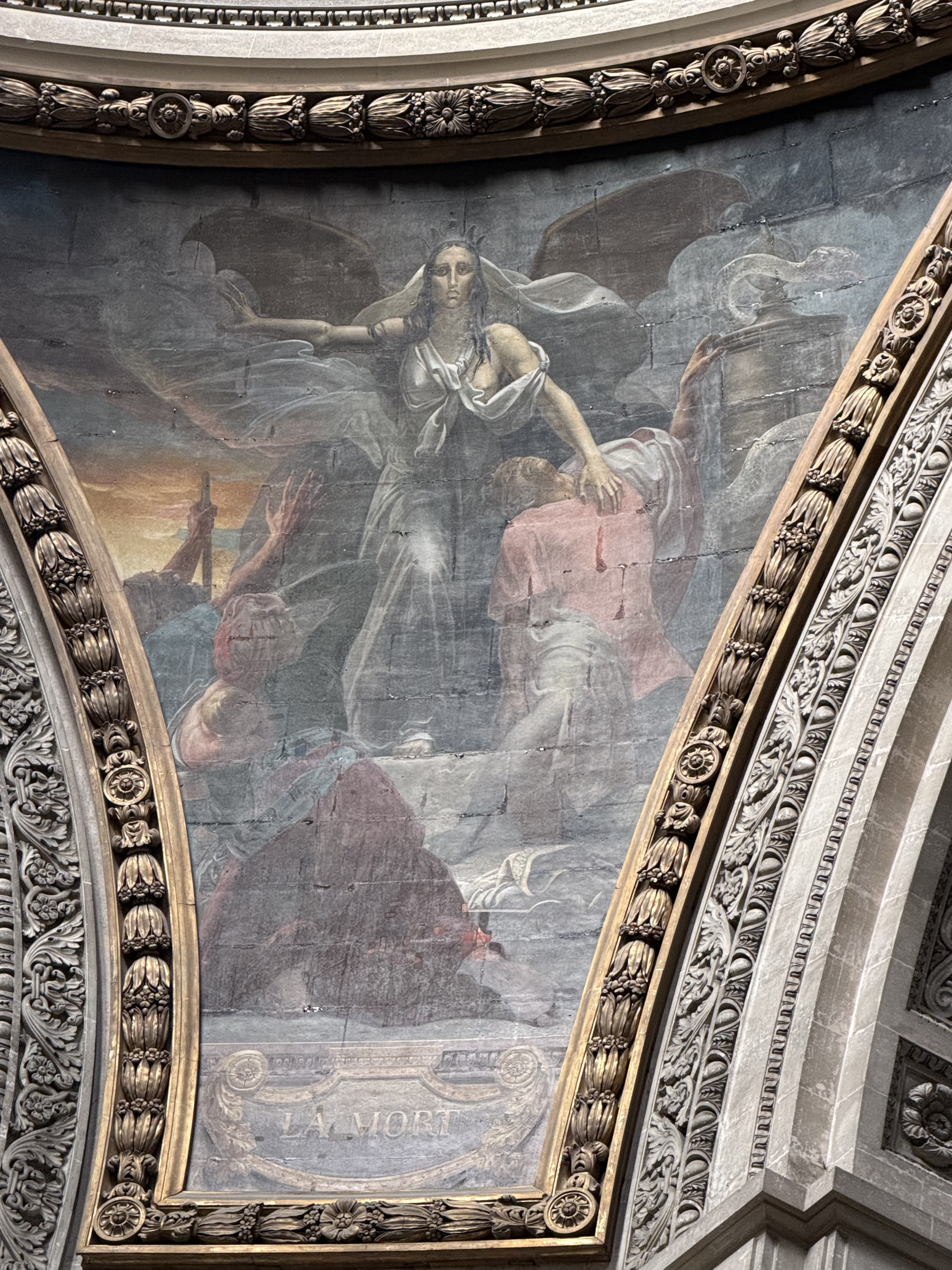
Painting on the Pendentive, depicting Death by François Gérard (1821–1837).

During the Bourbon Restoration which followed the fall of Napoleon, in 1816 Louis XVIII restored the entire Panthéon, including the crypt, to the Catholic Church. The church was also at last officially consecrated in the presence of the King, a ceremony which had been omitted during the Revolution. The sculpture on the pediment by Jean Guillaume Moitte, called The Fatherland crowning the heroic and civic virtues was replaced by a religious-themed work by David d'Angers. The reliquary of Saint Genevieve had been destroyed during the Revolution, but a few relics were found and restored to the church (They are now in the neighboring Church of Saint-Etienne-du-Mont). In 1822 François Gérard was commissioned to decorate the pendentives of the dome with new works representing Justice, Death, the Nation, and Fame. Jean-Antoine Gros was commissioned to redo his fresco on the inner dome, replacing Napoleon with Louis XVIII, as well as figures of Louis XVI and Marie Antoinette. The new version of the cupola was inaugurated in 1824 by Charles X. As to the crypt where the tombs were located, it was locked and closed to visitors.

=== Under Louis Philippe I, the Second Republic and Napoleon III (1830–1871) ===
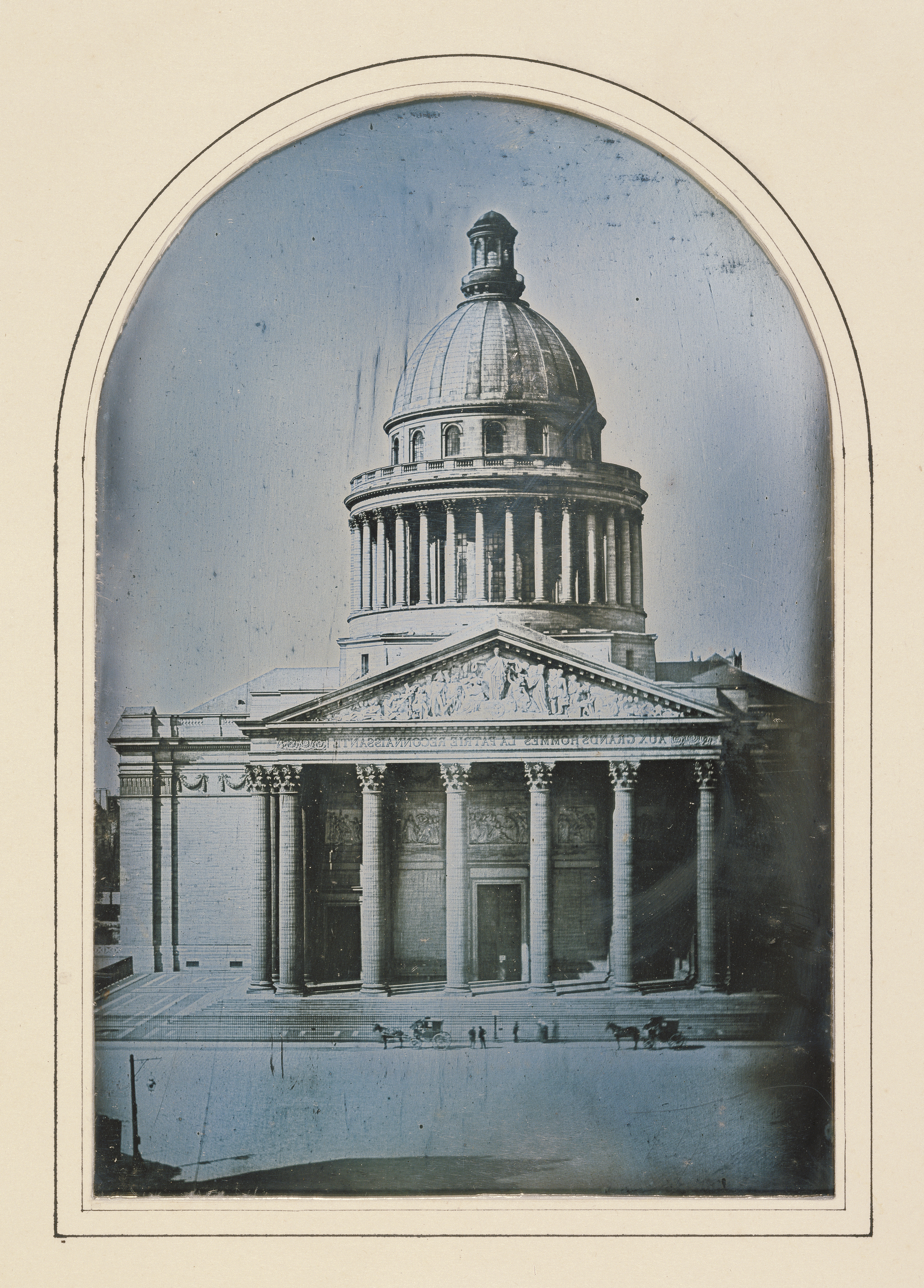
Daguerreotype by Alphonse Louis Poitevin, 1842

The French Revolution of 1830 placed Louis Philippe I on the throne. He expressed sympathy for Revolutionary values, and on 26 August 1830, the church once again became the Pantheon. However, the crypt remained closed to the public, and no new remains were added. The only change made was to the main pediment, which had been remade with a radiant cross; it was remade again by D'Angers with a patriotic work called The Nation Distributing Crowns Handed to Her by Liberty, to Great Men, Civil and Military, While History Inscribes Their Names.

Louis Philippe was overthrown in 1848 and replaced by the elected government of the Second French Republic, which valued revolutionary themes. The new government designated the Pantheon "The Temple of Humanity", and proposed to decorate it with sixty new murals honouring human progress in all fields. In 1851 the Foucault Pendulum of astronomer Léon Foucault was hung beneath the dome to illustrate the rotation of the earth. However, on complaints from the Church, it was removed in December of the same year.

Louis Napoléon, nephew of the Emperor, was elected President of France in December 1848, and in 1852 staged a coup-d'état and made himself Emperor. Once again the Pantheon was returned to the church, with the title of "National Basilica". The remaining relics of Saint Genevieve were restored to the church, and two groups of sculpture commemorating events in the life of the Saint were added. The crypt remained closed.

=== The Third Republic (1871–1939) ===
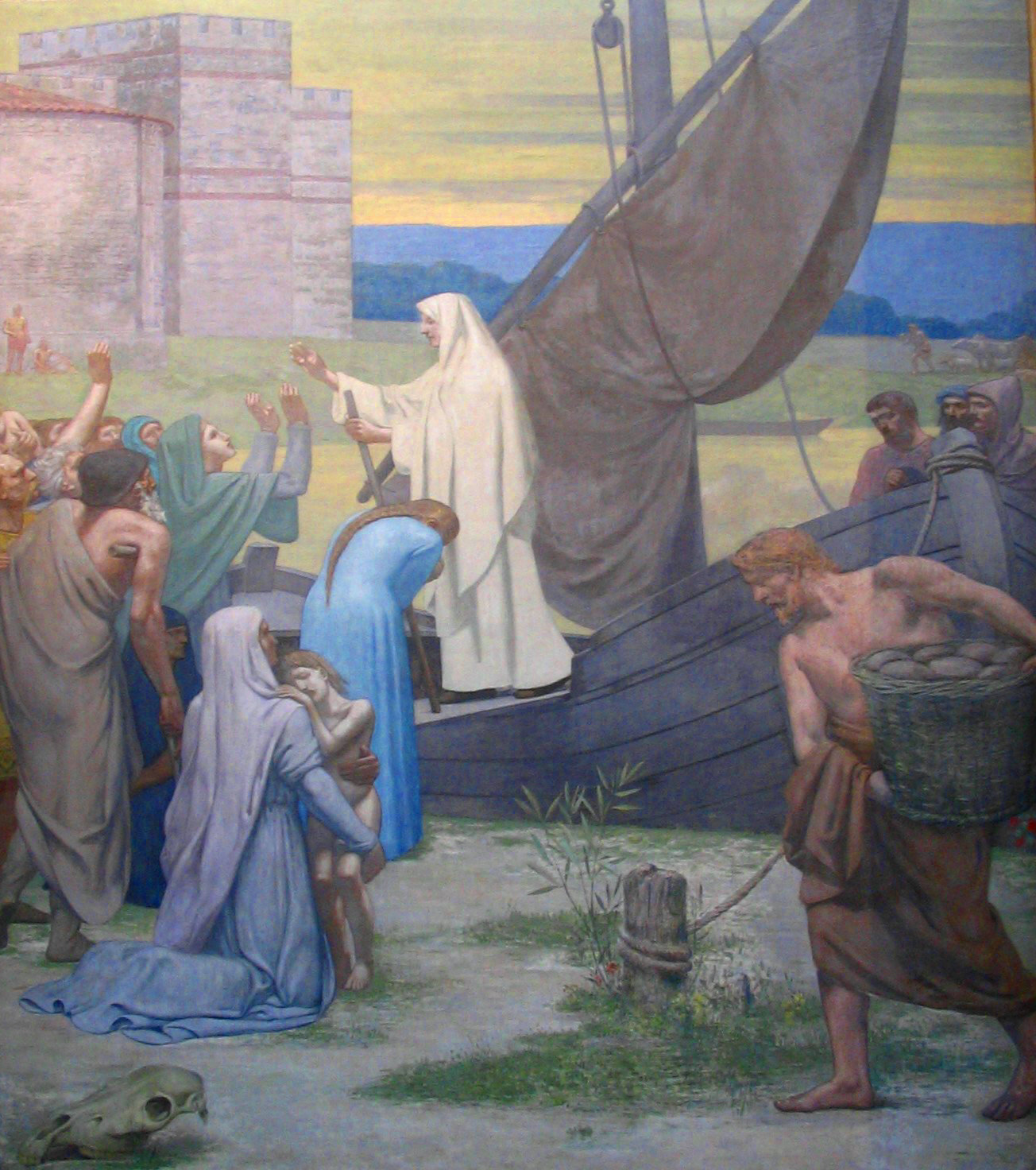
Saint Genevieve bringing supplies to Paris by Puvis de Chavannes (1874)

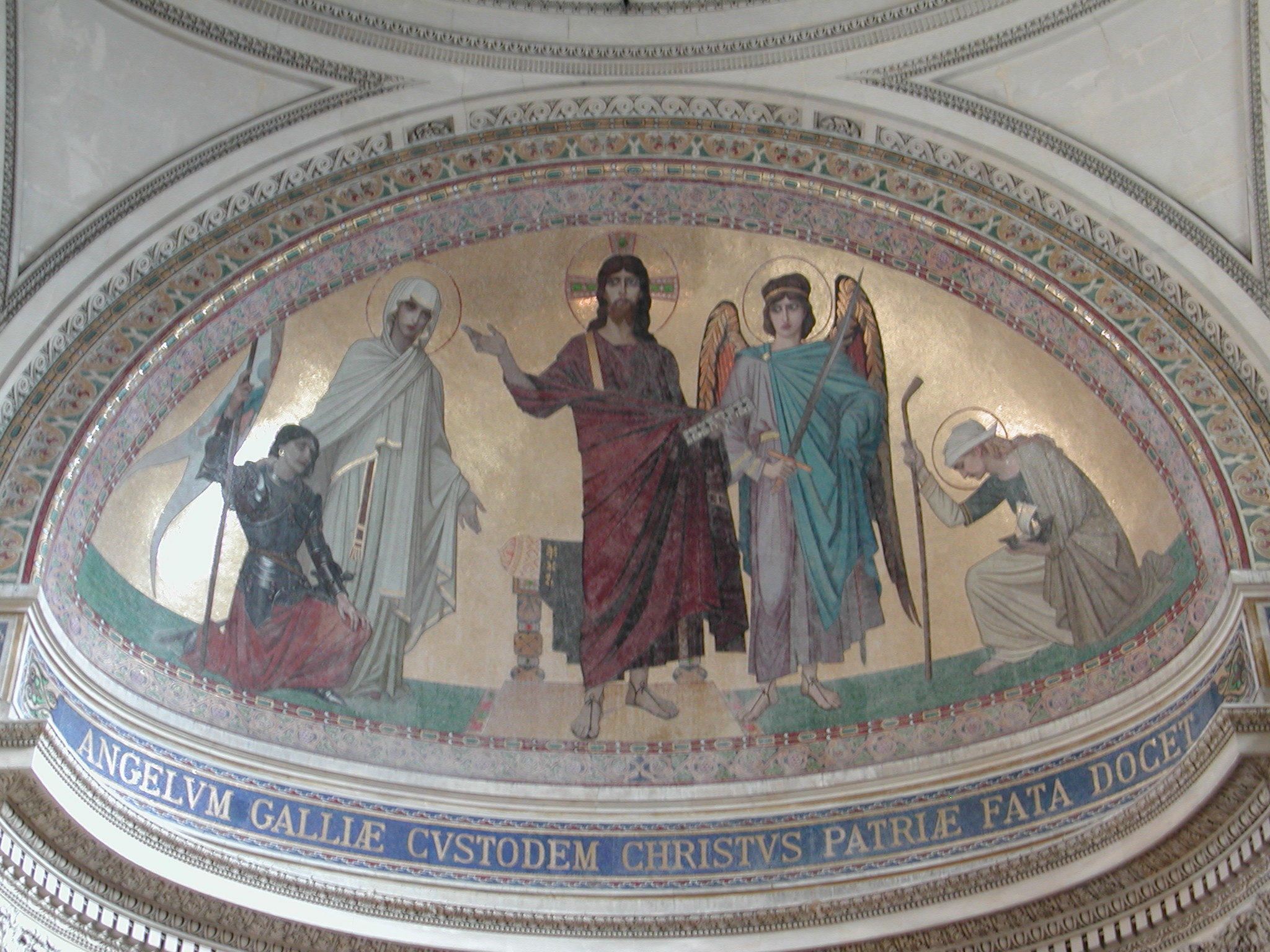
Christ Showing the Angel of France the Destiny of Her People, mosaic by Antoine-Auguste-Ernest Hébert

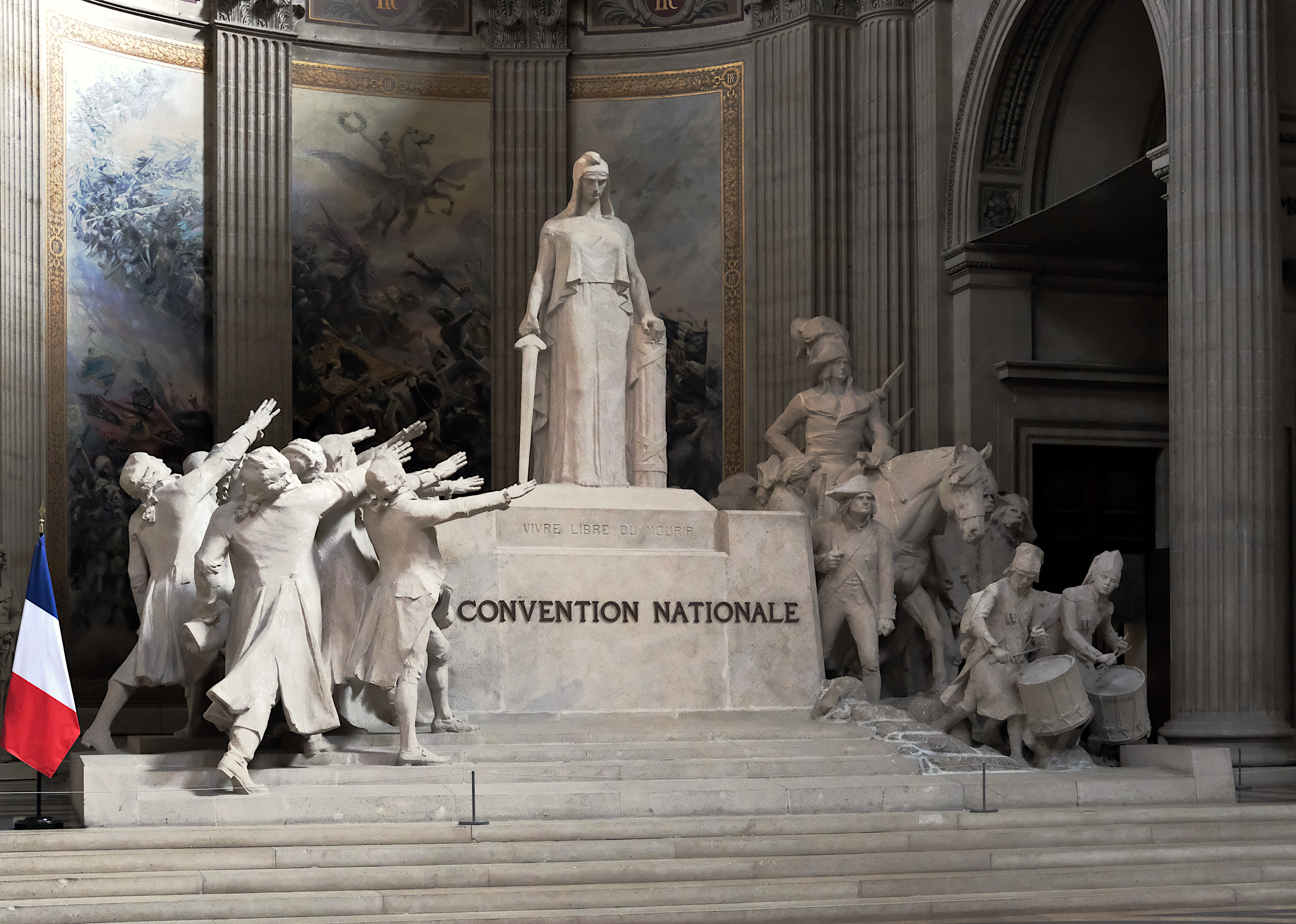
The National Convention by François-Léon Siccard (1921)

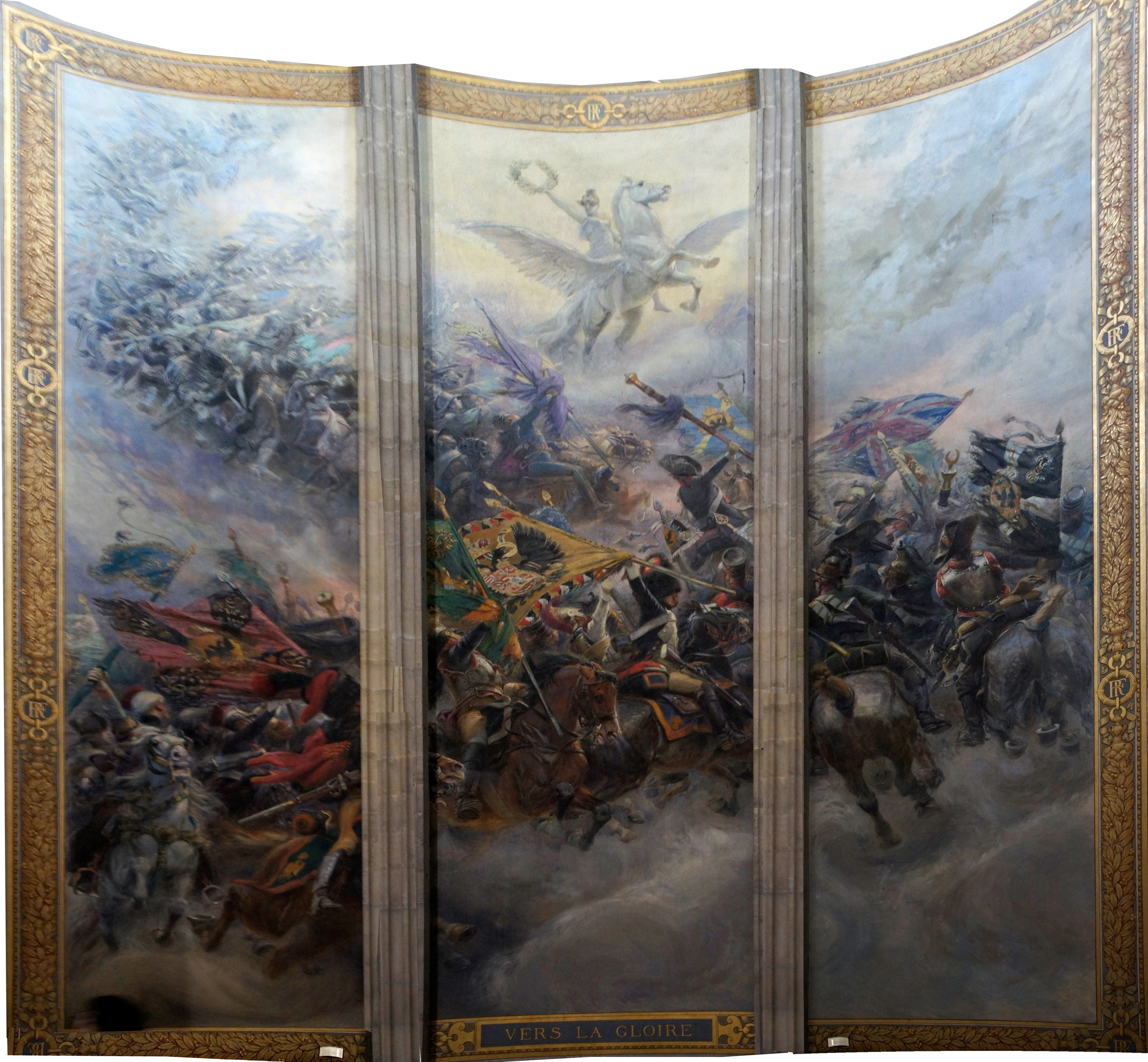
Victory leading the Armies of the Republic by Edouard Detaille (1905)

The Basilica suffered damage from German shelling during the 1870 Franco-Prussian War. During the brief reign of the Paris Commune in May 1871, it suffered more damage during fighting between the Commune soldiers and the French Army. During the early years of the Third Republic, under conservative governments, it functioned as a church, but the interior walls were largely bare. Beginning in 1874, the interior was redecorated with new murals and sculptural groups linking French history and the history of the church, by notable artists including Puvis de Chavannes and Alexandre Cabanel, and the artist Antoine-Auguste-Ernest Hébert, who made a mosaic under the vault of the apsidal chapel called Christ Showing the Angel of France the Destiny of Her People.

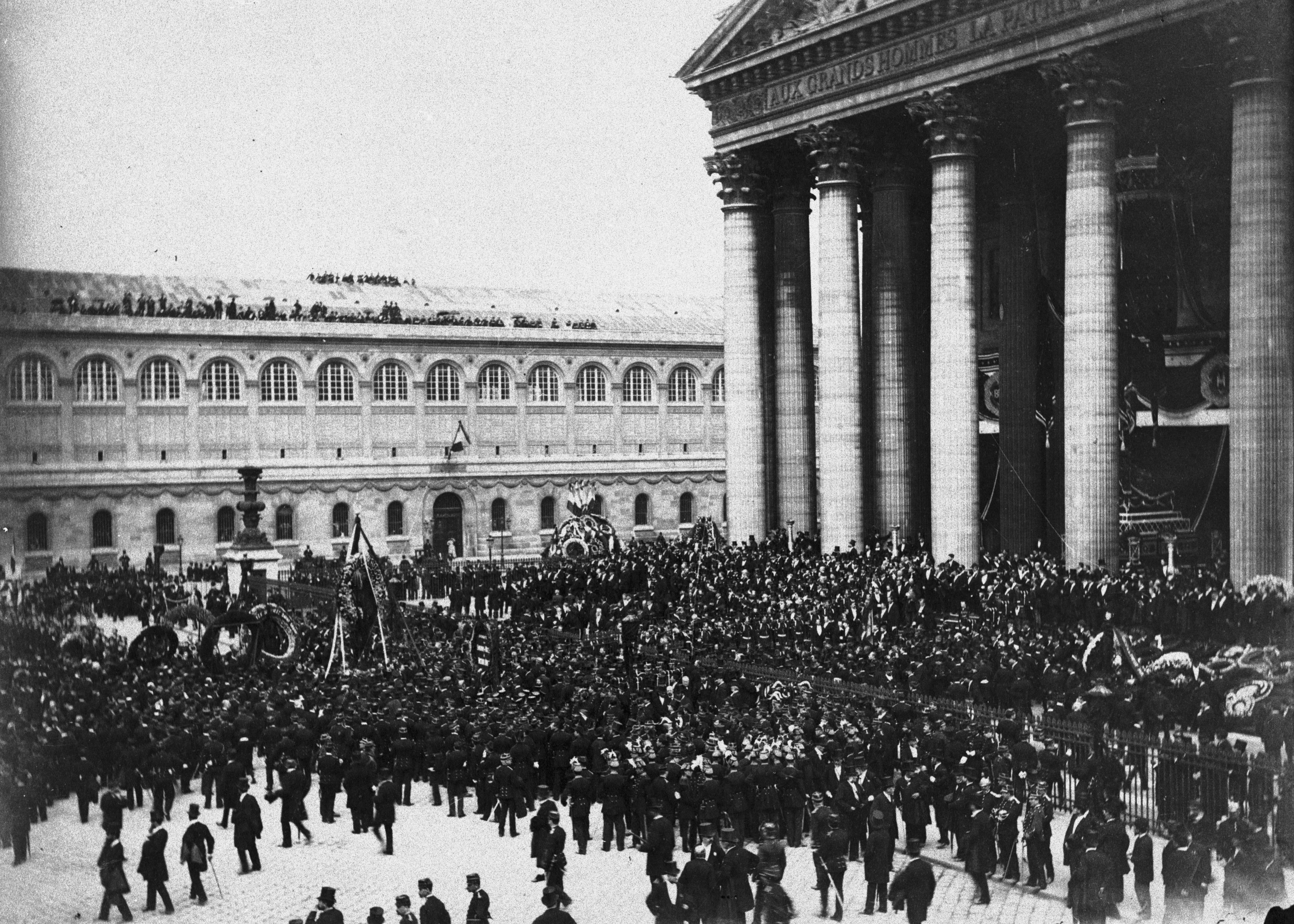
Funeral of Victor Hugo on 1 June 1885

In 1881, a decree was passed to transform the Church of Saint Genevieve into a mausoleum again. Victor Hugo was the first to be placed in the crypt afterwards. The subsequent governments approved the entry of literary figures, including the writer Émile Zola (1908), and, after World War I, leaders of the French socialist movement, including Léon Gambetta (1920) and Jean Jaurès (1924). The Third Republic governments also decreed that the building should be decorated with sculpture representing "the golden ages and great men of France." The principal works remaining from this period include the sculptural group called The National Assembly, commemorating the French Revolution; a statue of Mirabeau, the first man interred in the Pantheon, by Jean-Antoine Ingabert; (1889–1920); and two patriotic murals in the apse Victory Leading the Armies of the Republic to Towards Glory by Édouard Detaille, and Glory Entering the Temple, Followed by Poets, Philosophers, Scientists and Warriors, by Marie-Désiré-Hector d'Espouy (1906).

=== 1945–present ===
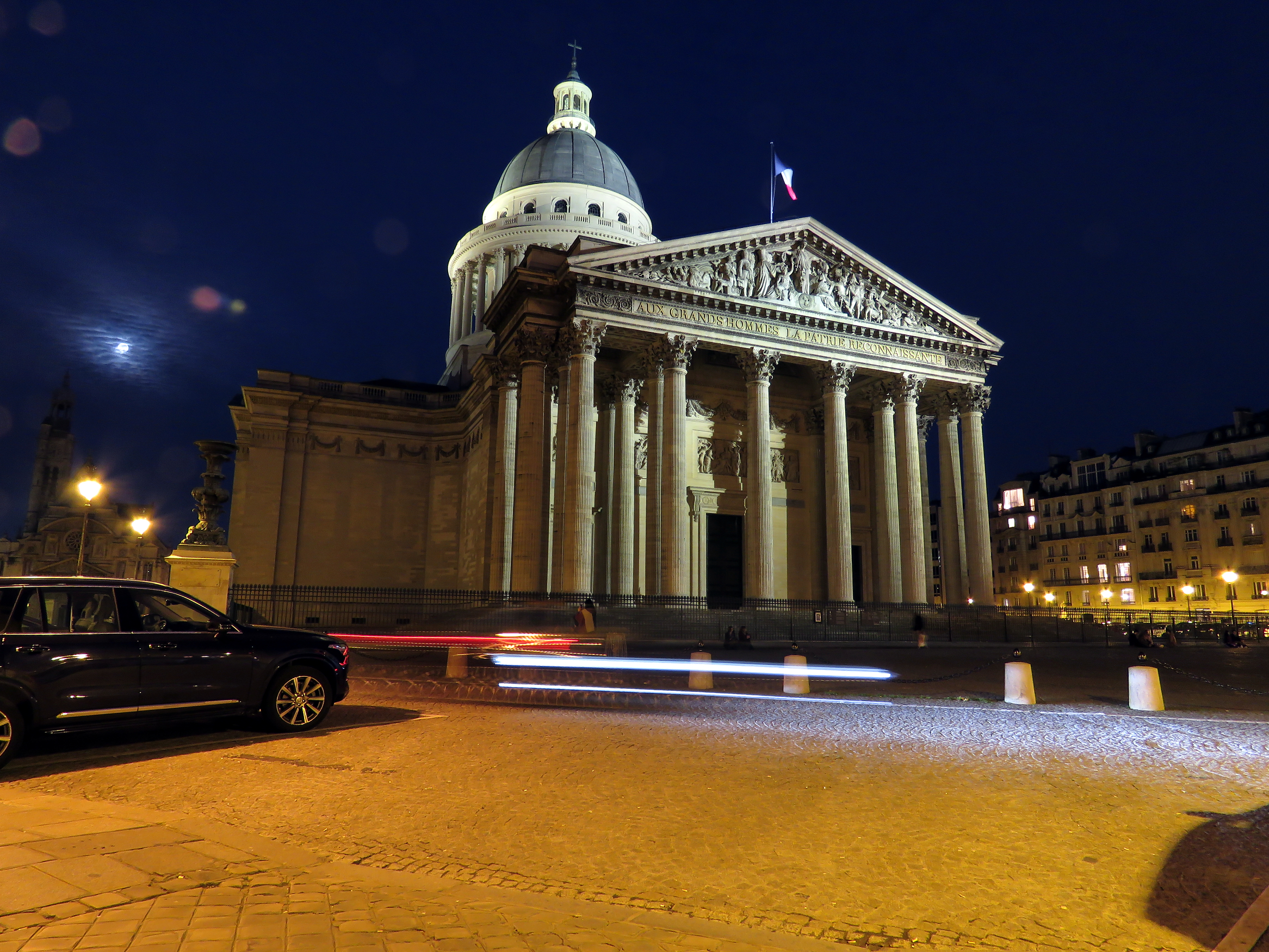
The Panthéon at night

The short-lived Fourth Republic (1948–1958) following World War II pantheonized two physicists, Paul Langevin and Jean Perrin; a leader of the abolitionist movement, Victor Schœlcher; early leader of Free France and colonial administrator Félix Éboué; and Louis Braille, inventor of the Braille writing system, in 1952.

Under the Fifth Republic of President Charles de Gaulle, the first person to be buried in the Panthéon was the Resistance leader Jean Moulin. Modern figures buried in recent years include Nobel Peace Prize winner René Cassin (1987) known for drafting the Universal Declaration of Human Rights; Jean Monnet (1988) who was a moving force in the creation of the ECSC, the forerunner of the EU, was interred in the 100th anniversary of his birth; Nobel laureates physicists and chemists Marie Curie and Pierre Curie (1995); the writer and culture minister André Malraux (1996); and the lawyer and politician Simone Veil (2018). In 2021, Josephine Baker was inducted into the Panthéon. In 2026, Marc Bloch and his wife Simonne Vidal were inducted.

== Architecture and art ==
=== Dome ===
The final plan of the dome was accepted in 1777, and it was completed in 1790. It was designed to rival those of St. Peter's Basilica in Rome and St Paul's Cathedral in London. Unlike the dome of Les Invalides in Paris, which has a wooden framework, the dome is constructed entirely of stone. It is actually three domes, one within the other, with the painted ceiling, visible from below, on the second dome. The dome is 83.0 metres (272 ft) high, compared with the tallest dome in the world, St. Peter's Basilica at 136.57 metres (448.1 ft).

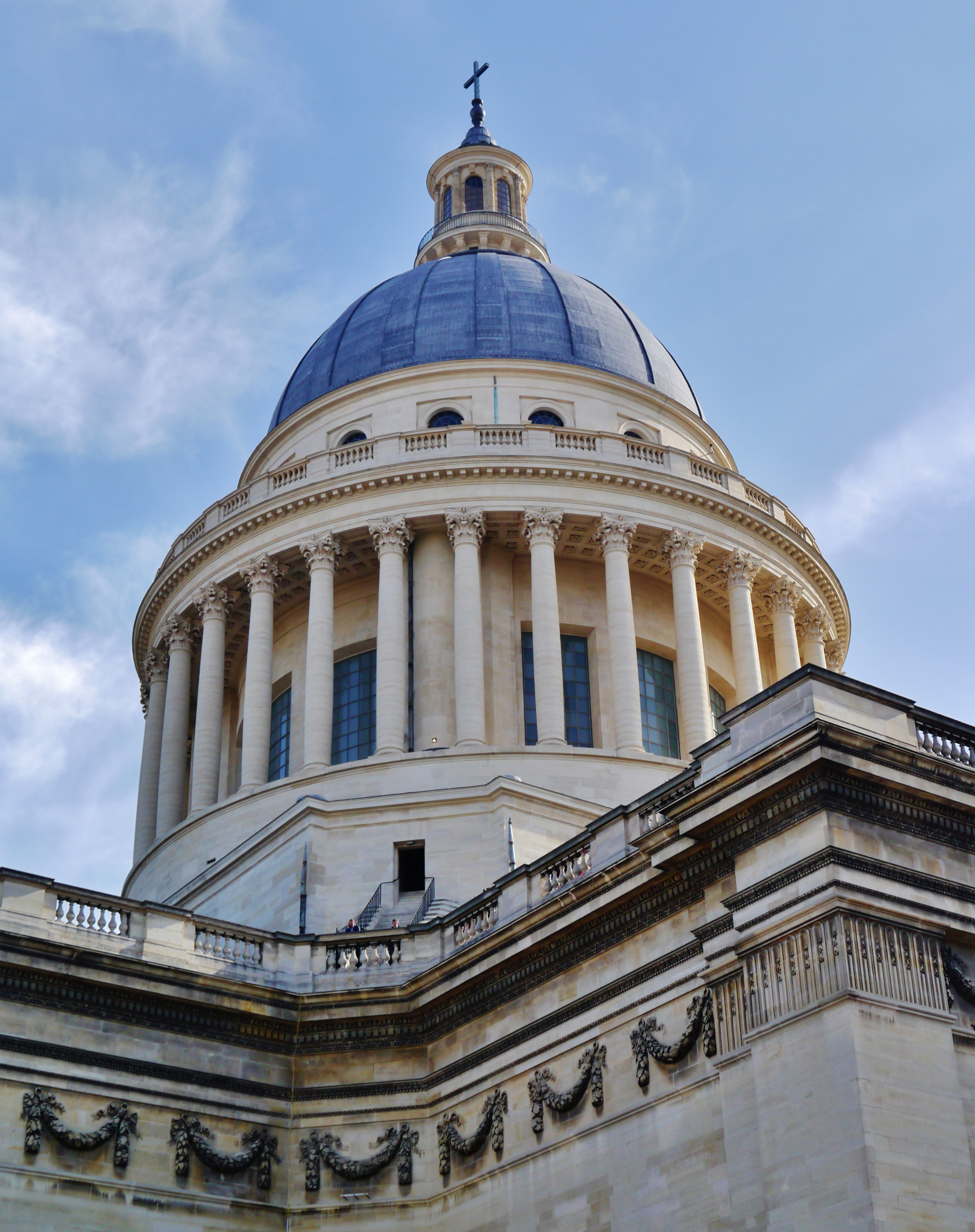
Dome

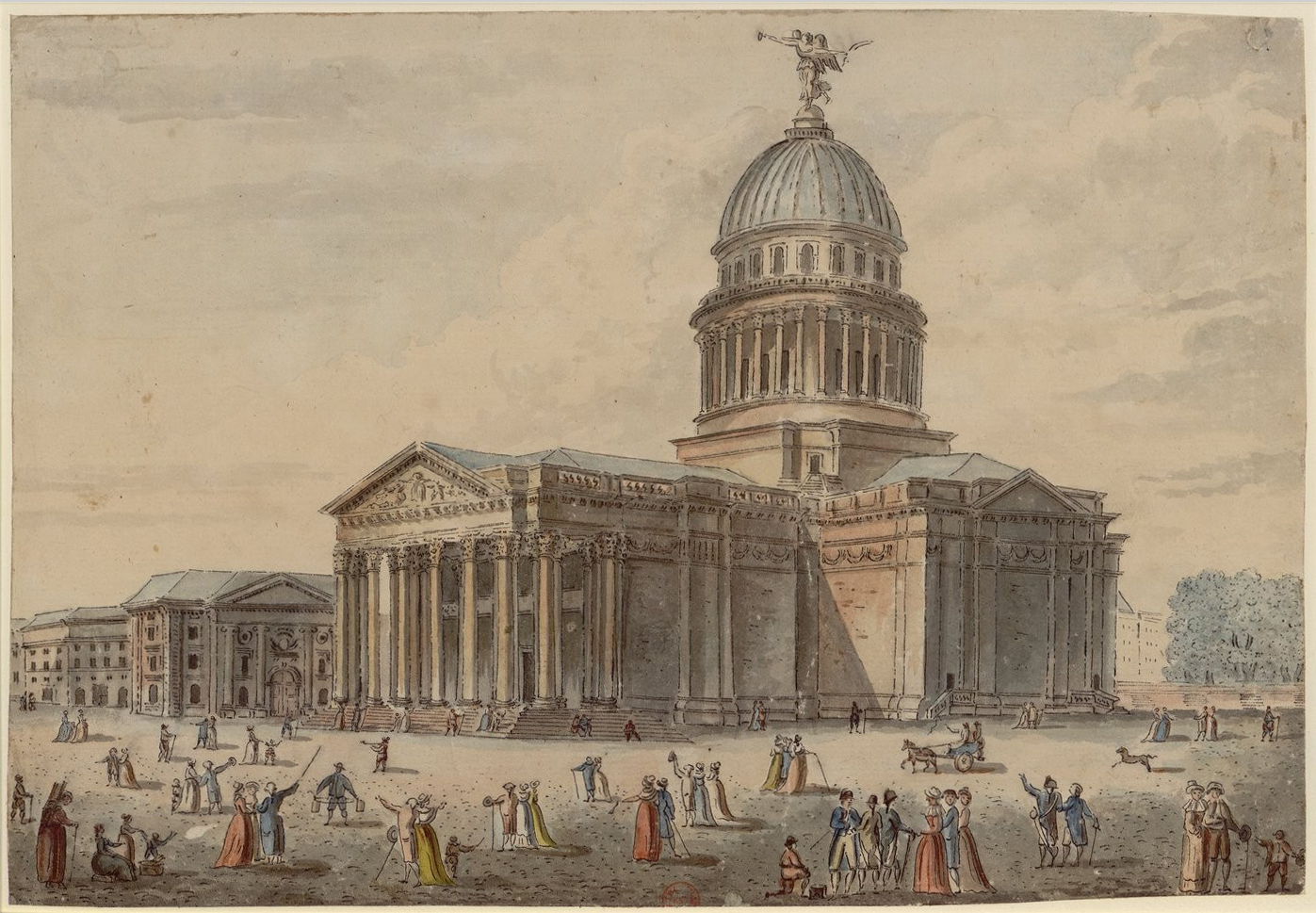
The Panthéon represented with a statue of Fame at its top

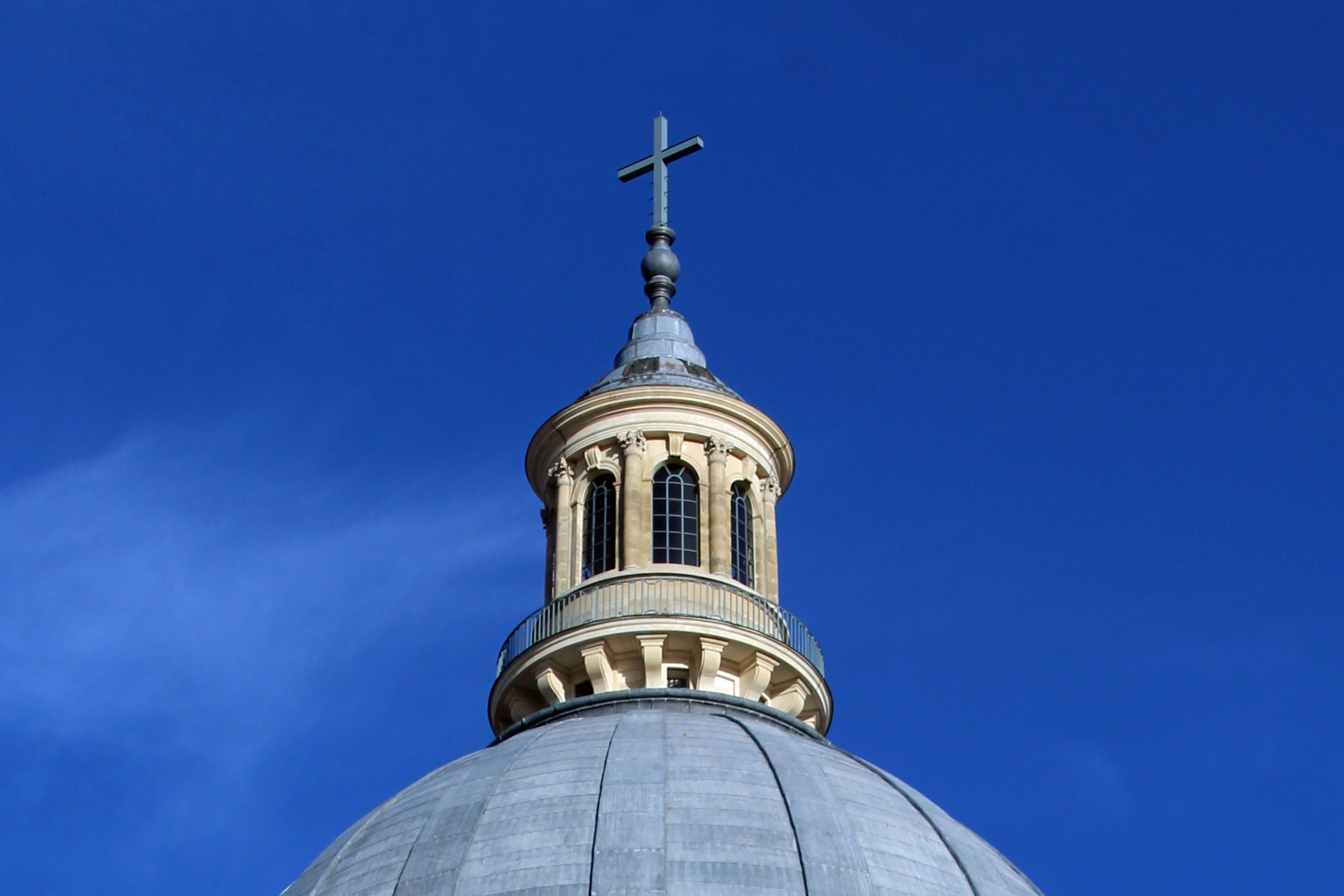
The present-day cross atop the roof lantern

The dome is capped by a cross. However, a statue of Saint Genevieve was initially supposed to sit at the top of the dome. A cross was put temporarily in 1790. After the transformation into a mausoleum in 1791, it was planned that the cross would be replaced by a statue representing Fame. The project was however abandoned. Between 1830 and 1851, a flag was put instead. The cross returned after Louis-Napoleon Bonaparte restored the building to church use. The cross was replaced with a red flag during the Paris Commune in 1871. A cross returned subsequently.

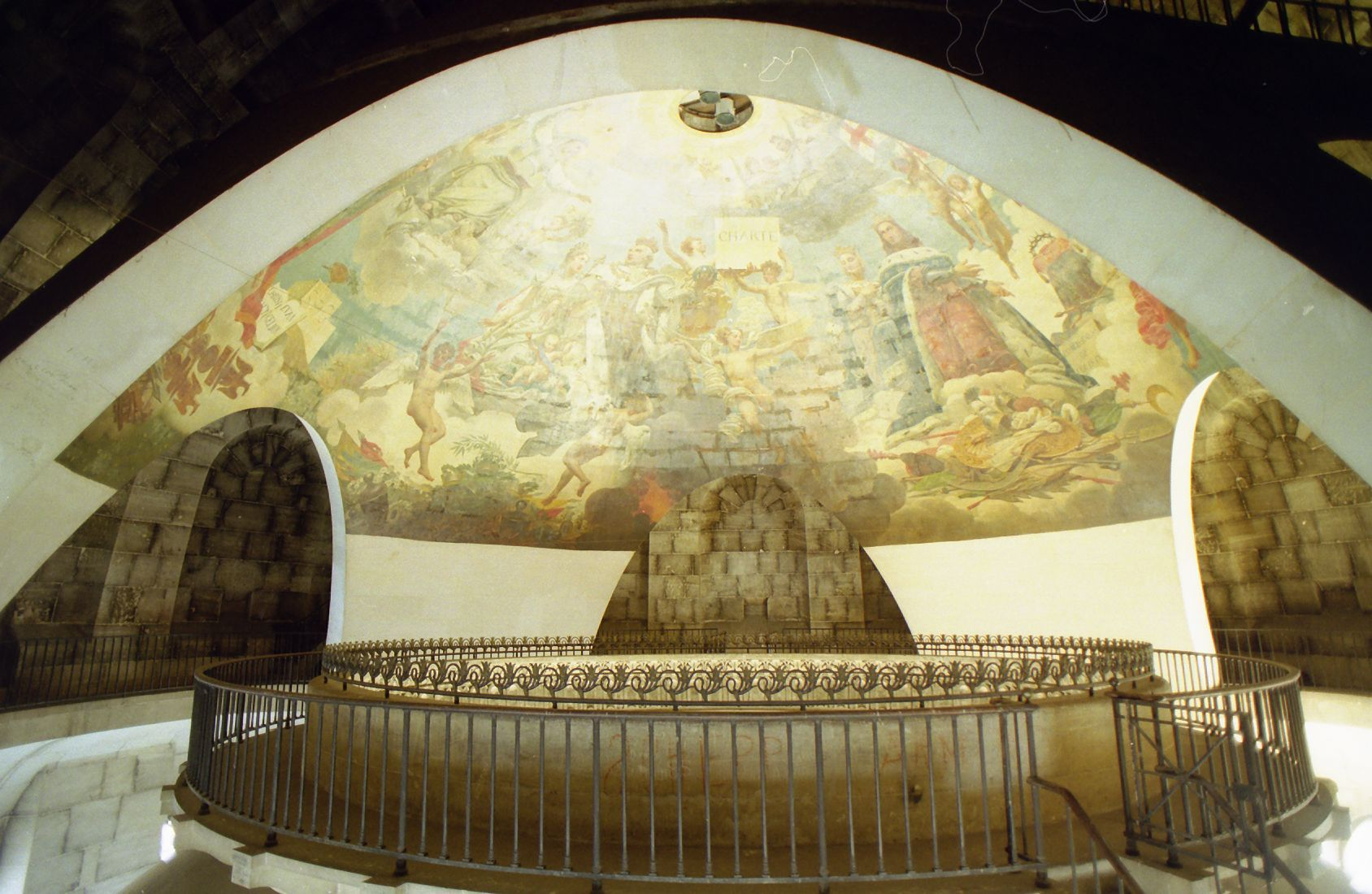
The fresco by Gros seen from inside the dome

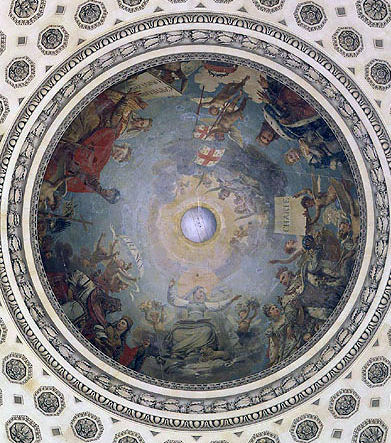
The Apotheosis of Saint Genevieve, in the dome by Antoine-Jean Gros (1811–1834)

Looking up from the crossing of the transept beneath the dome, the painting by Jean-Antoine Gros, the Apotheosis of Saint Genevieve (1811–1834), is visible through the opening in the lowest cupola. The triangle in the center symbolizes the Trinity, surrounded by a halo of light. The Hebrew characters spell the name of God. The only character seen in full is Saint Genevieve herself, seated on a rocky promontory. The groups around the painting, made during the Restoration of the Monarchy, represent Kings of France who played an important role in protecting the church. To the left of Saint Genevieve is a group including Clovis, the first King to convert to Christianity. The second group is centred around Charlemagne, who created the first universities. The third group is centred around Louis IX of France, or Saint Louis, with the Crown of Thorns which he brought back from the Holy Land to place in the church of Sainte-Chapelle. The last group is centred around Louis XVIII, the last King of the Restoration, and his niece, looking up into the clouds at the martyred Louis XVI and Marie-Antoinette. The angels in the scene are carrying the Chartre, the document by which Louis XVIII re-established the church after the French Revolution.

The four pendentives, or arches, which support the dome are decorated with paintings from the same period by François Gérard depicting Glory, Death, The Nation and Justice (1821–37).

=== Façade, peristyle and entrance ===
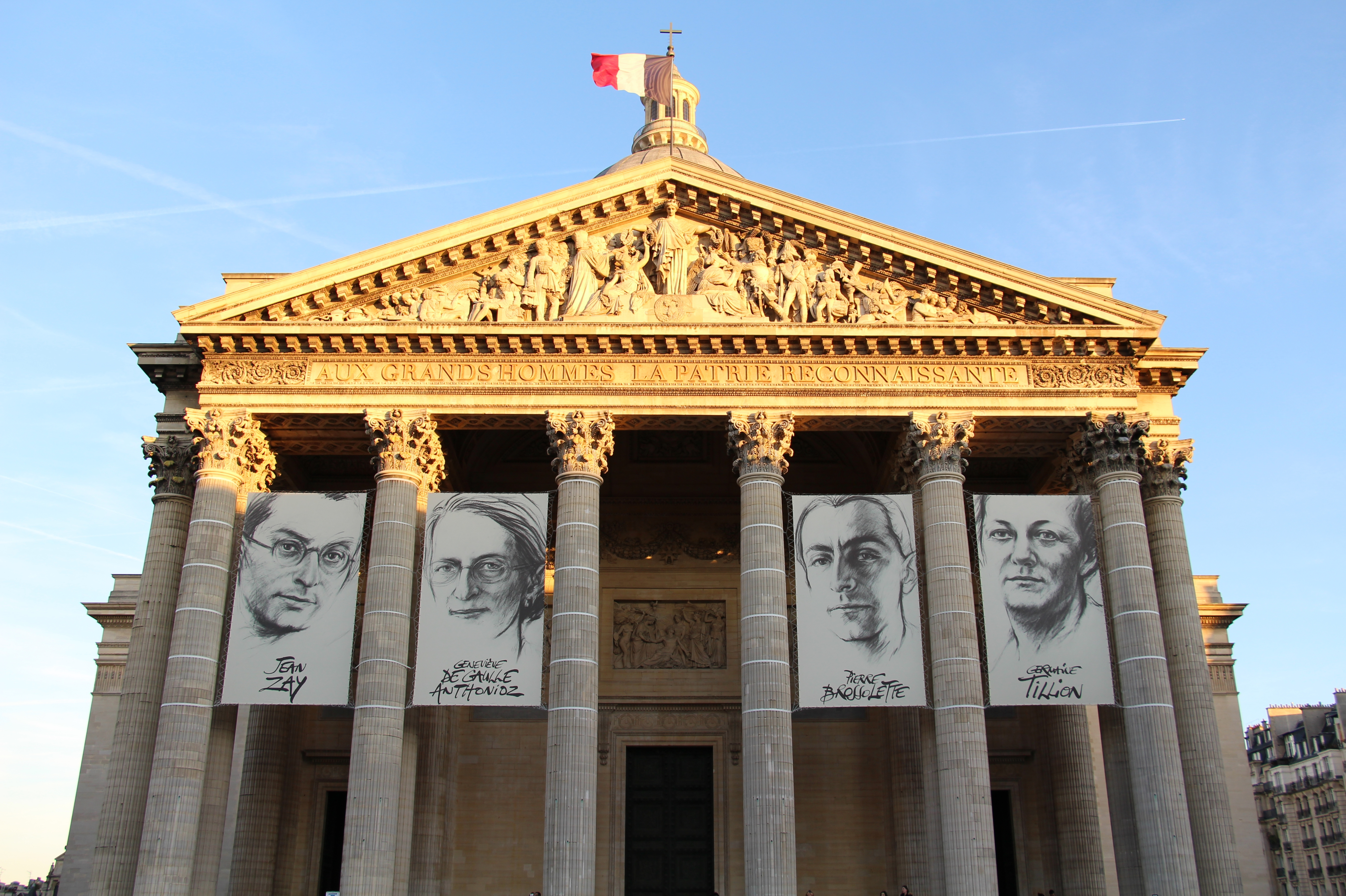
Main façade

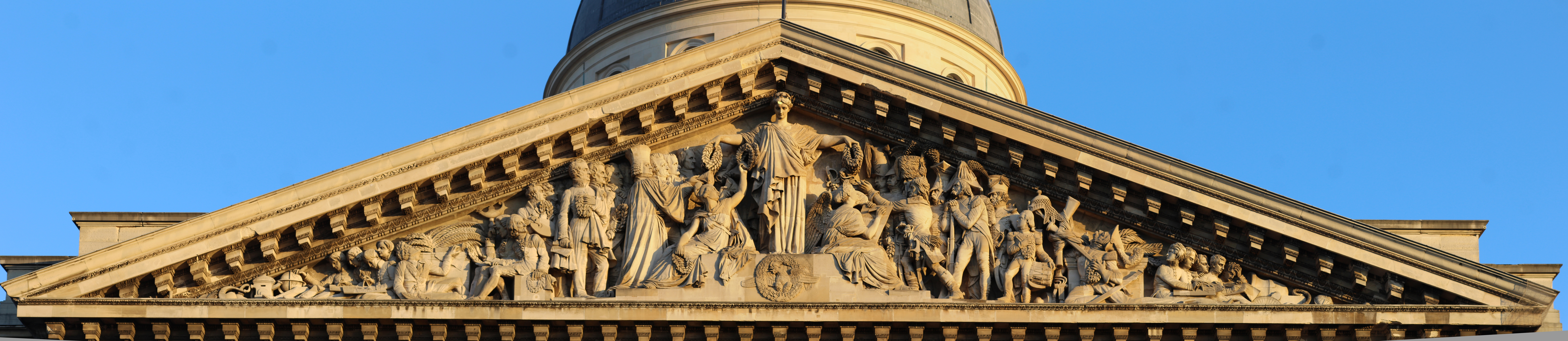
The pediment, with the central figures of the Nation and Liberty: statesmen and scholars to the left, soldiers to the right

The façade and peristyle on the east side, modeled after a Greek temple, features Corinthian columns and pedimental sculpture by David d'Angers, completed in 1837. The sculpture on this pediment, replacing an early pediment with religious themes, represents "The Nation distributing crowns handed to her by Liberty to great men, civil and military, while history inscribes their names". To the left are figures of distinguished scientists, philosophers, and statesmen, including Rousseau, Voltaire, Lafayette, and Bichat. To the right is Napoleon Bonaparte, along with soldiers from each military service and students in uniform from the École Polytechnique. Below is the inscription: "To the great men, from a grateful nation" ("Aux grands hommes la patrie reconnaissante"). This was added in 1791, when the Panthéon was created. It was removed during the Restoration of the monarchy, then put back in 1830.

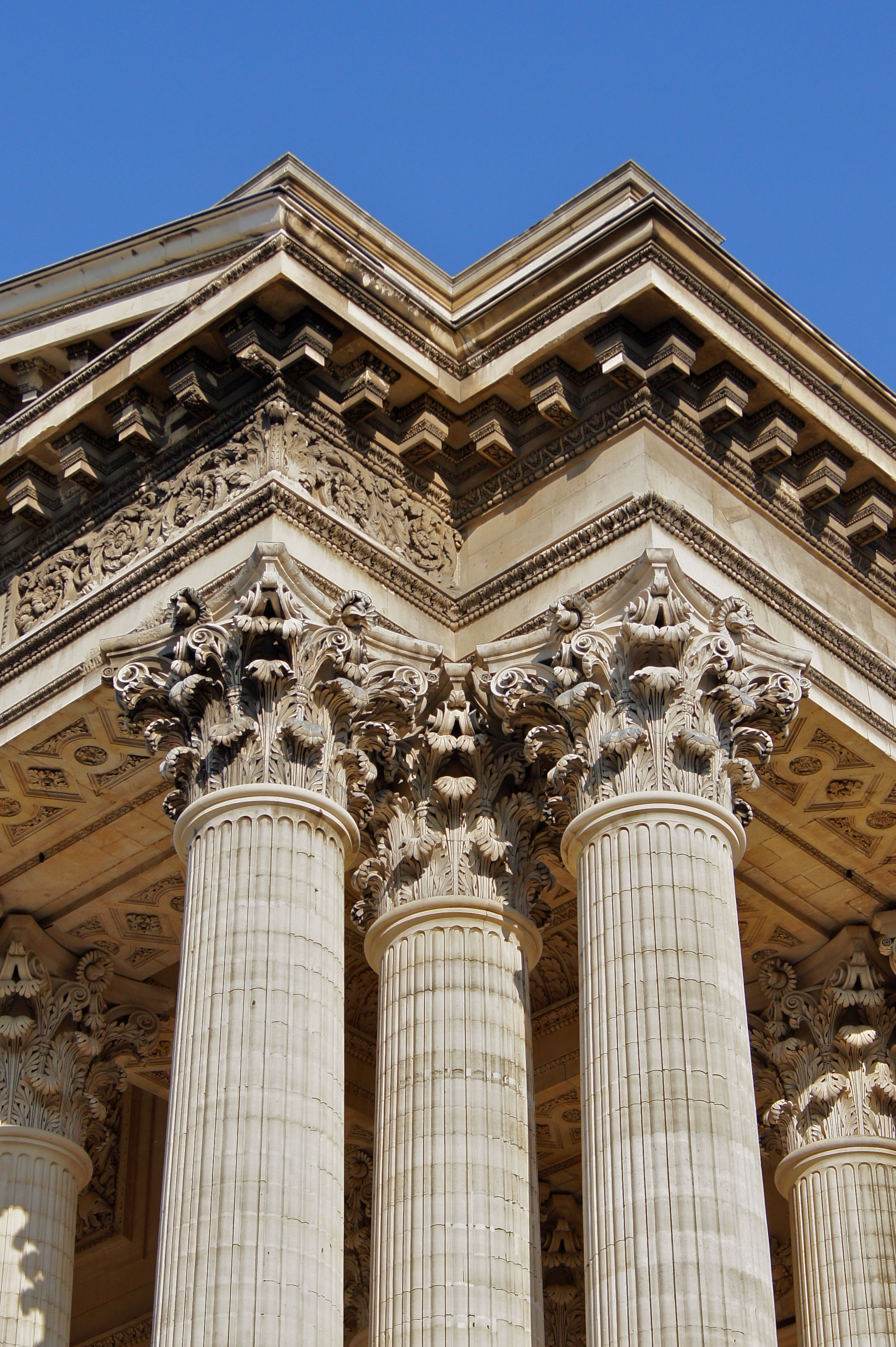
The richly detailed Corinthian order

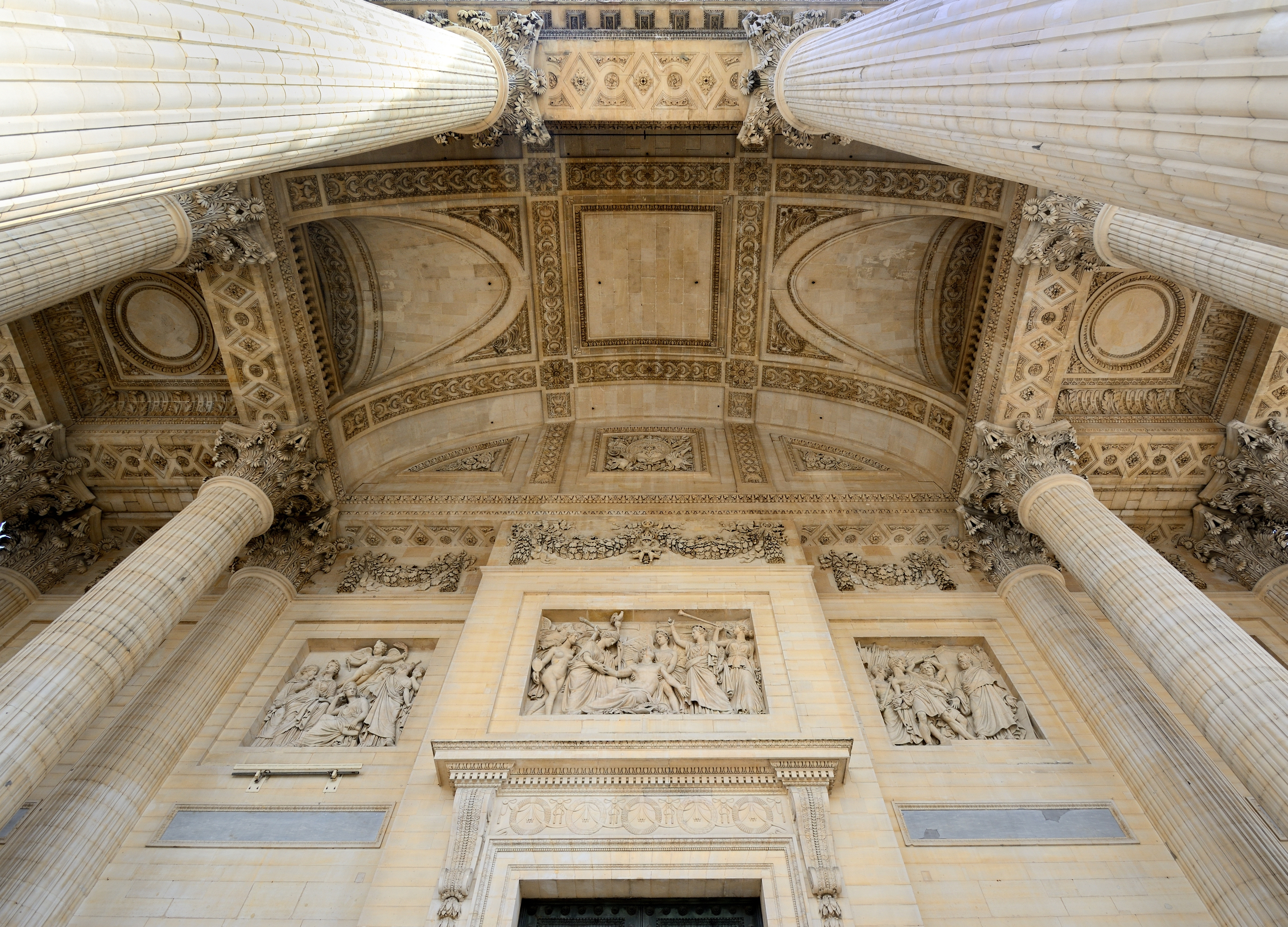
Bas-reliefs below the peristyle

Below the peristyle are five sculpted bas-reliefs; the two reliefs over the main doors, commissioned during the Revolution, represent the two main purposes of the building: "Public Education" (left) and "Patriotic Devotion" (right).

The façade originally had large windows, but they were replaced when the church became a mausoleum, to make the interior darker and more somber.

=== Narthex and naves ===
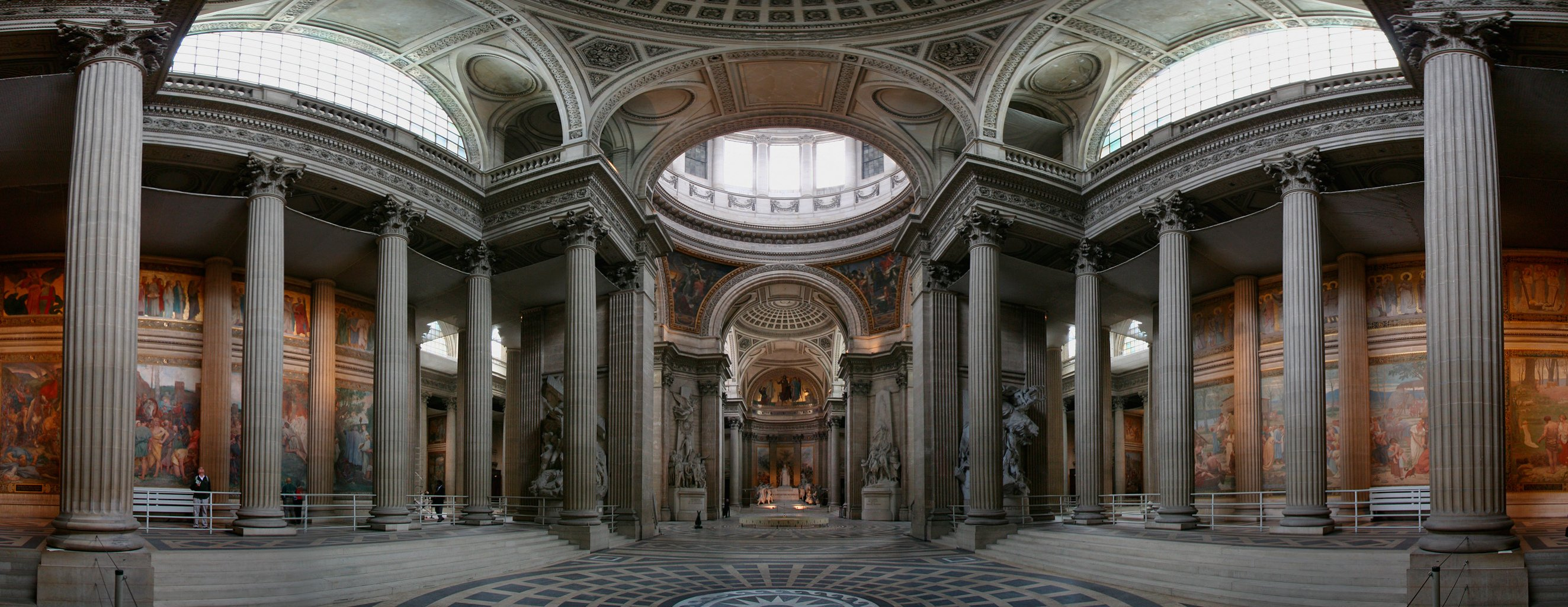
Panoramic view of interior

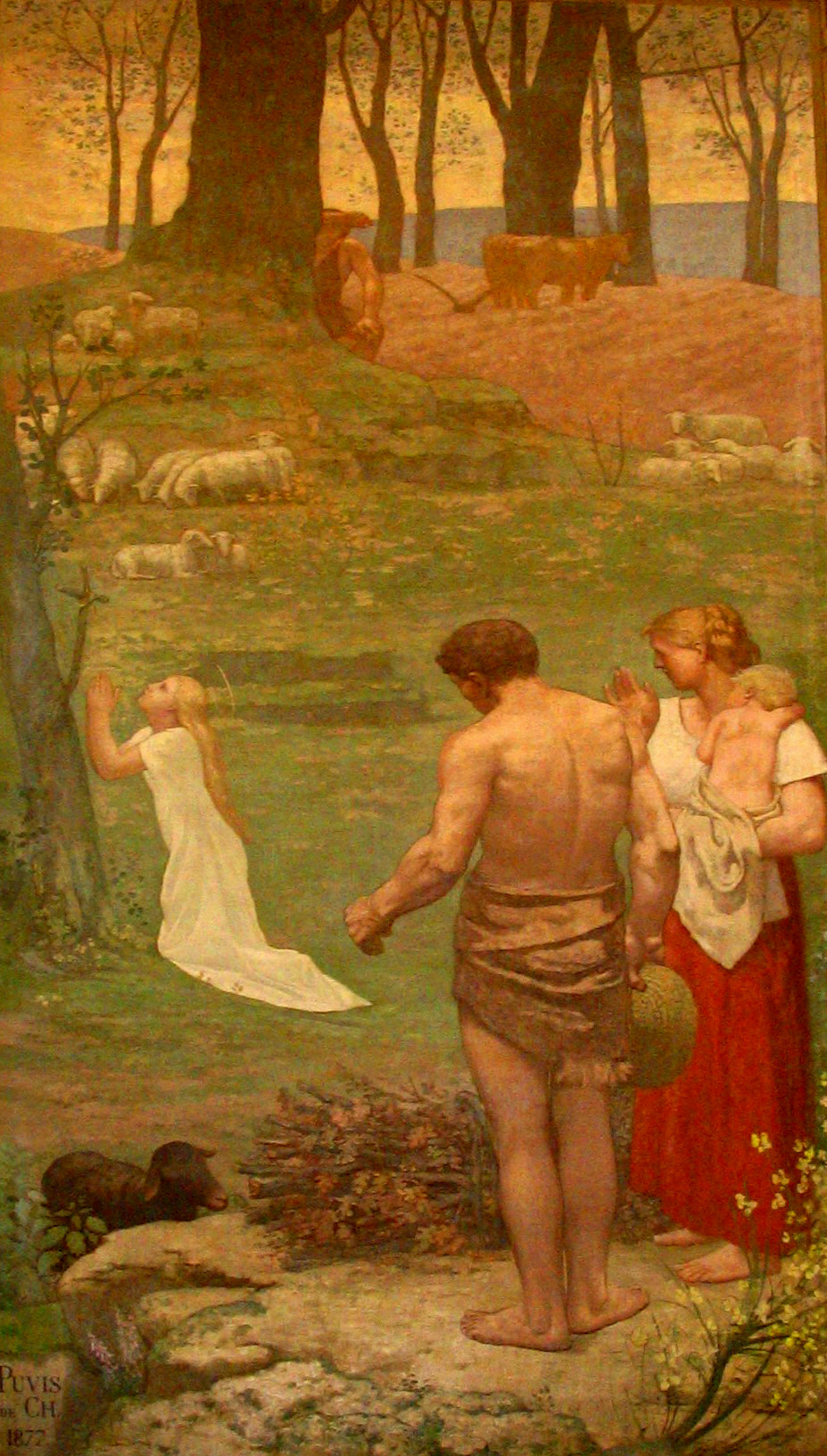
Saint Genevieve as a child in prayer, by Puvis de Chavannes (1876)

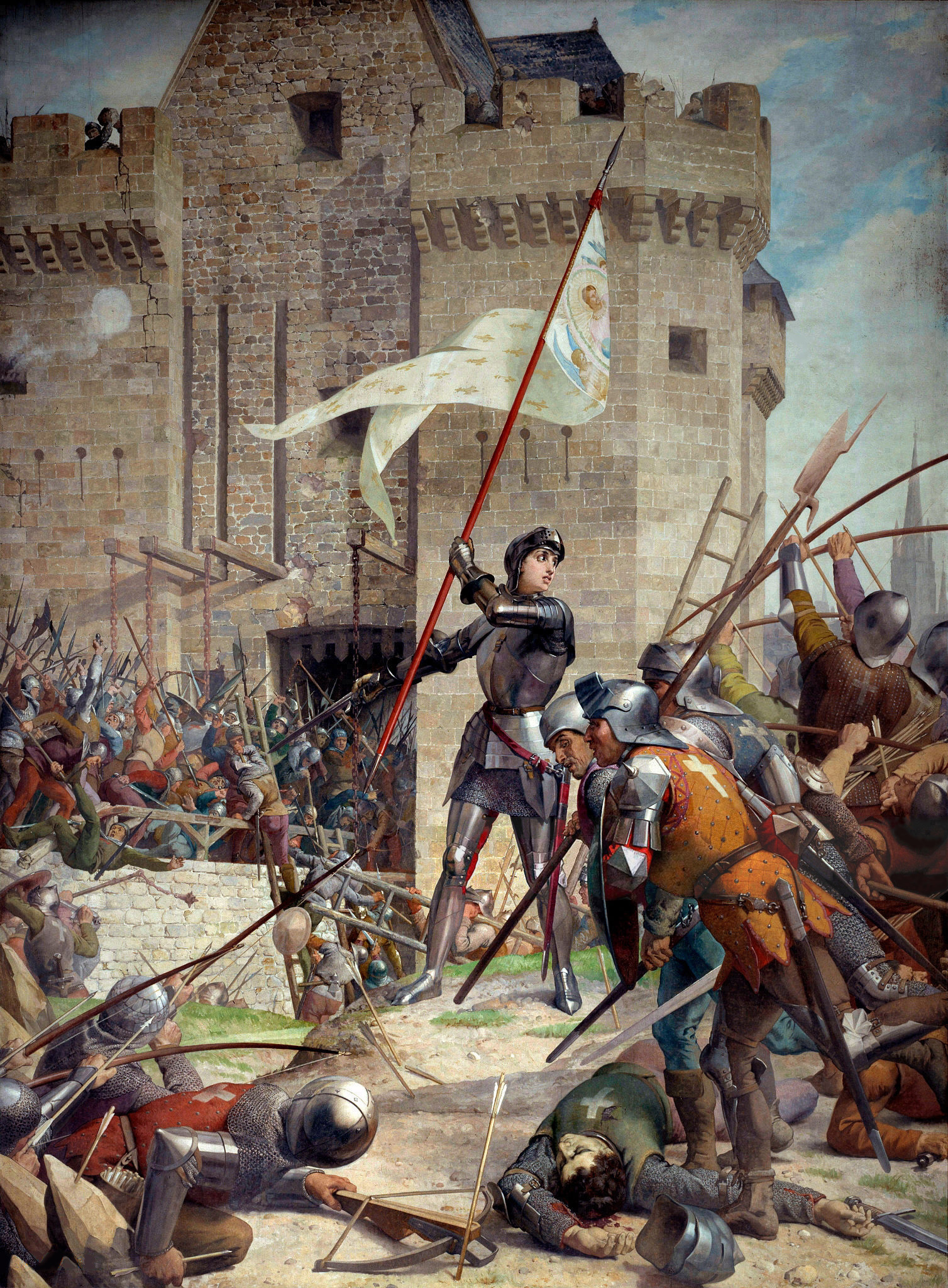
Joan of Arc at Orleans, by Jules Eugène Lenepveu

The primary decoration of the Western Nave is a series of paintings, beginning in the Narthex, depicting the lives of Saint Denis, the patron saint of Paris, and longer series on the life of Saint Genevieve, by Puvis de Chavannes, Alexandre Cabanel, Jules Eugène Lenepveu and other notable history painters of the 19th century. The paintings of the Southern nave and Northern Nave continue this series on the Christian heroes of France, including scenes from the lives of Charlemagne, Clovis, Louis IX of France and Joan of Arc. From 1906 to 1922 the Panthéon was the site of Auguste Rodin's famous sculpture The Thinker.

=== Foucault pendulum ===
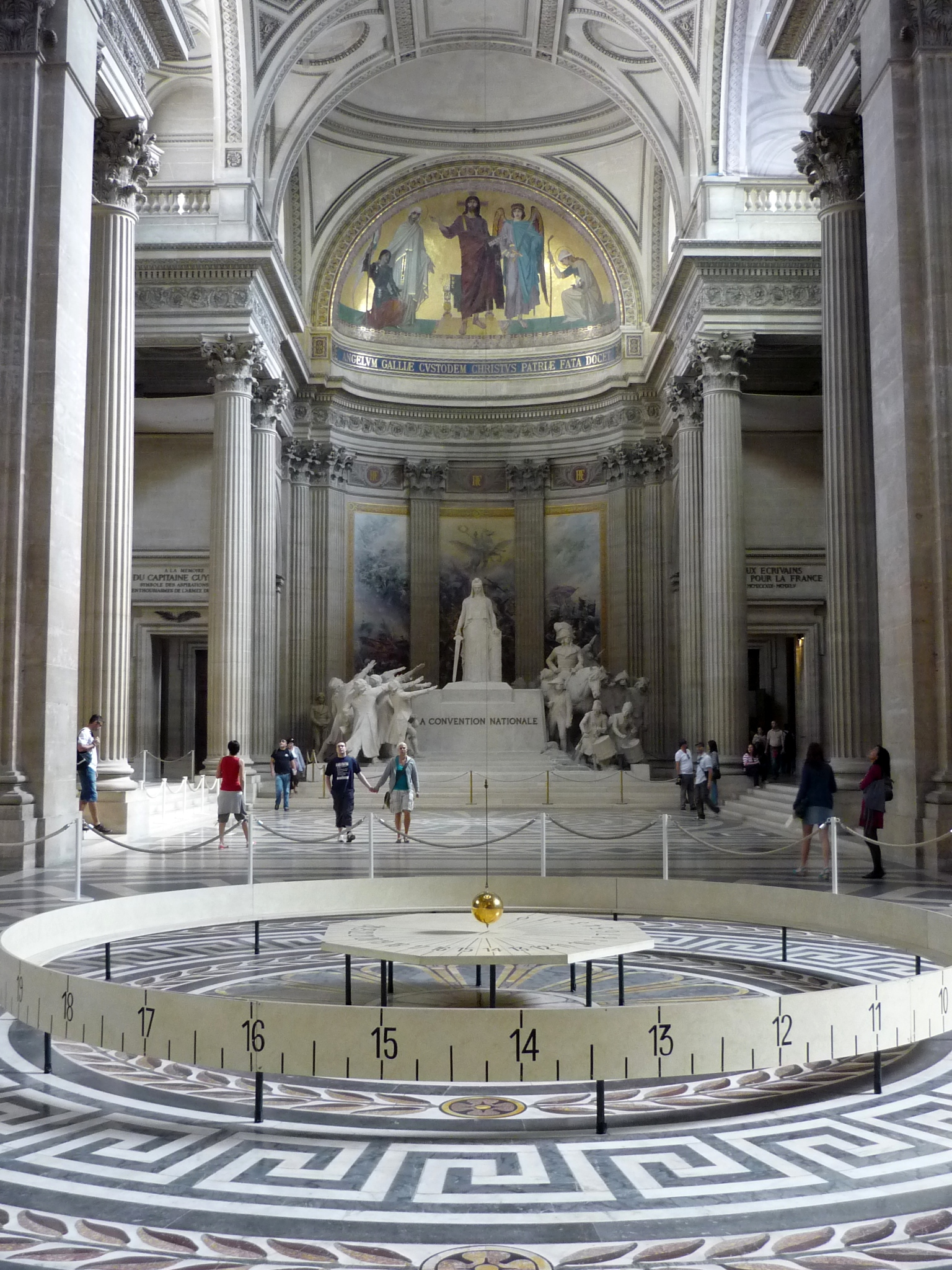

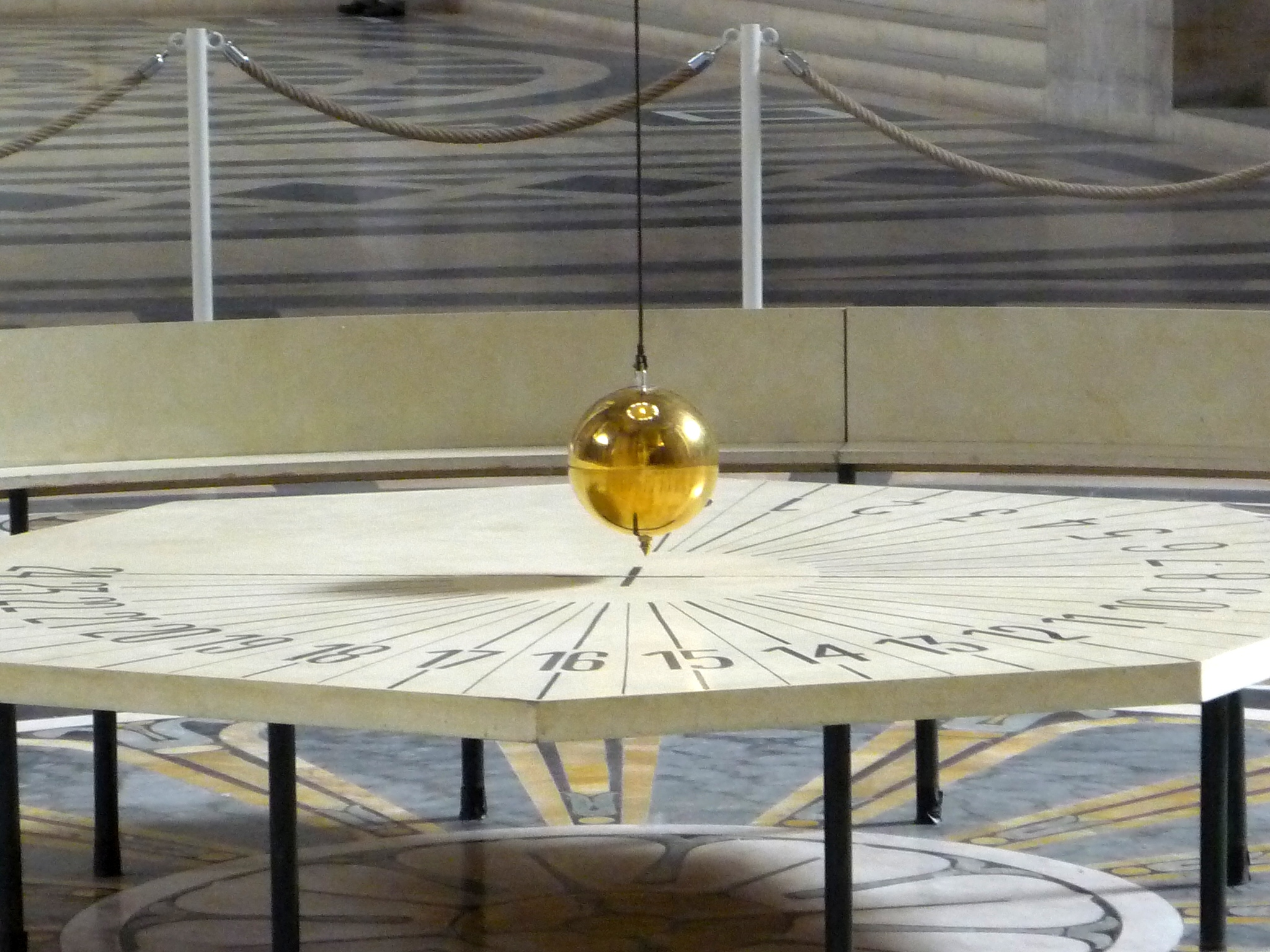

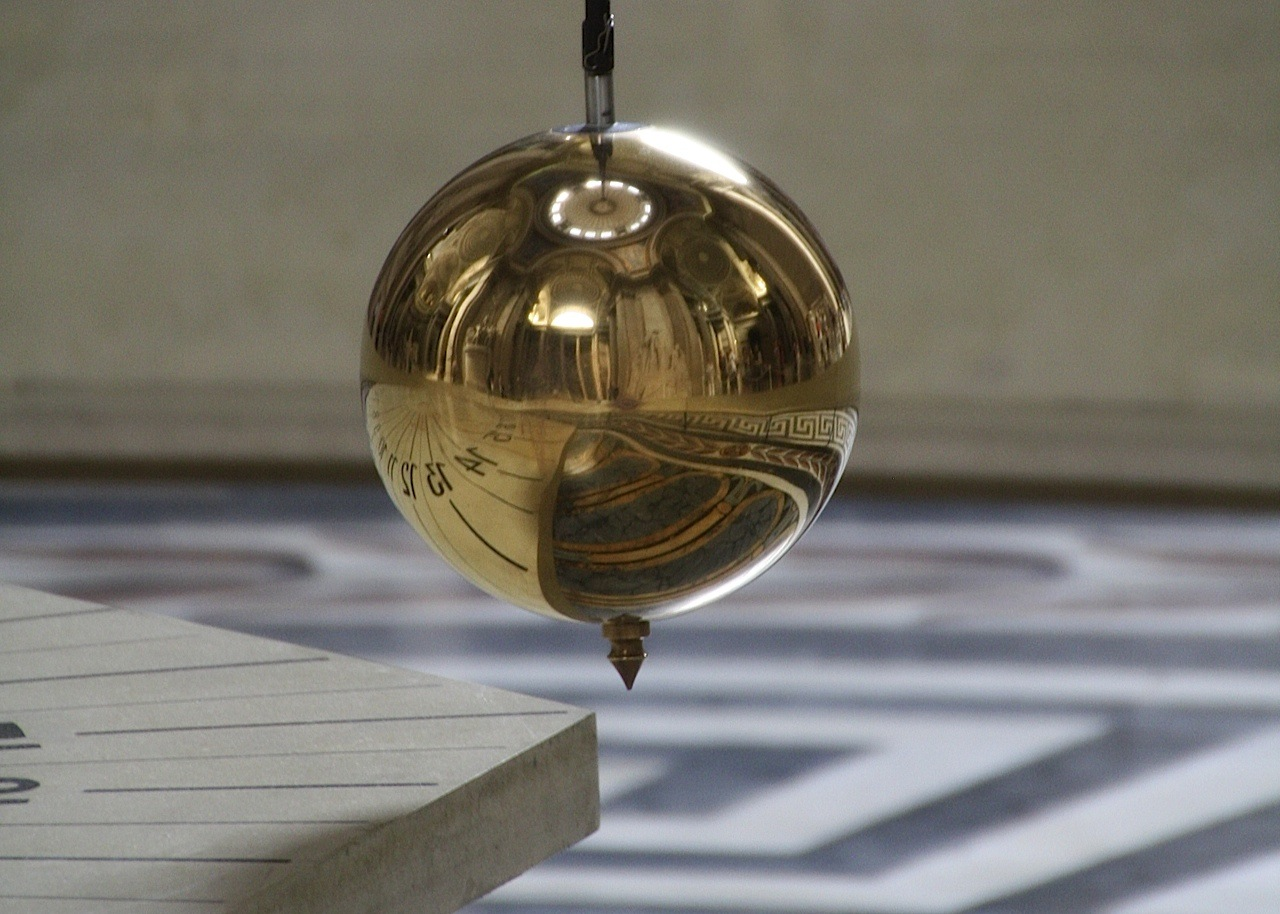

In 1851, physicist Léon Foucault demonstrated the rotation of the Earth by constructing a 67-metre (220 ft) pendulum beneath the central dome. The original sphere from the pendulum was temporarily displayed at the Panthéon in the 1990s (starting in 1995) during renovations at the Musée des Arts et Métiers. The original pendulum was later returned to the Musée des Arts et Métiers, and a copy is now displayed at the Panthéon. It has been listed since 1920 as a monument historique by the French Ministry of Culture.

== Interment in the crypt ==
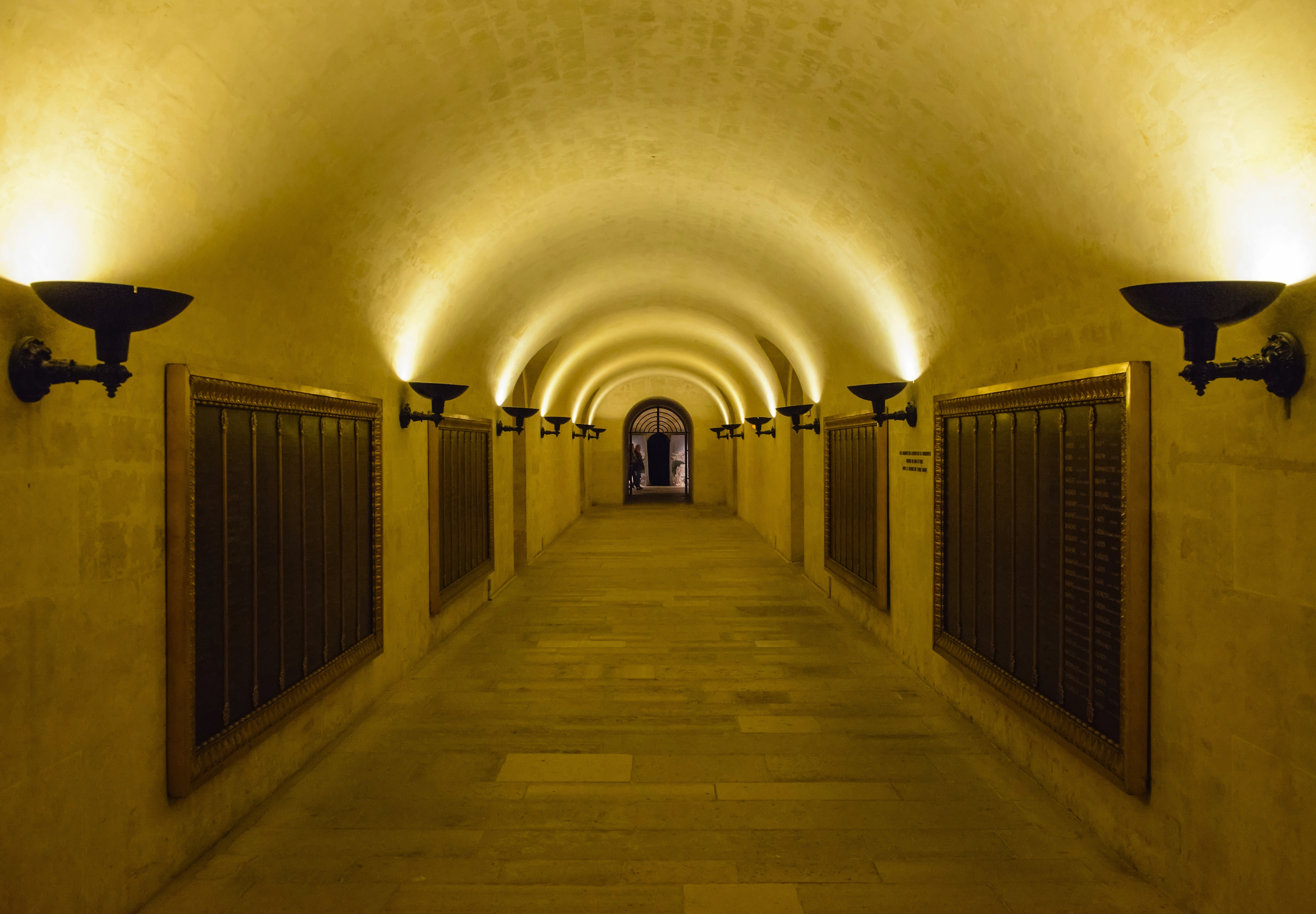
A corridor of the Crypt

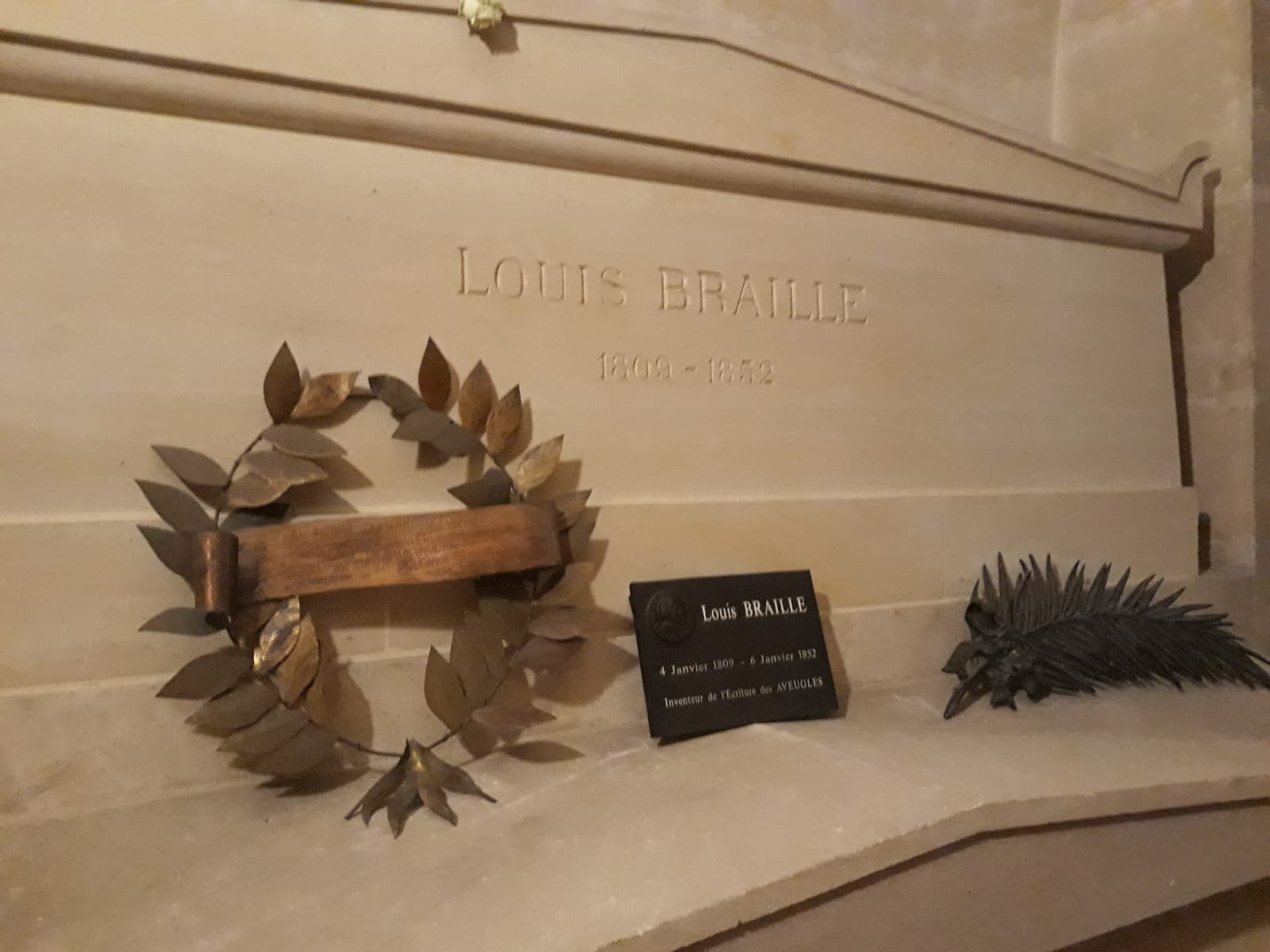
Tomb of Louis Braille

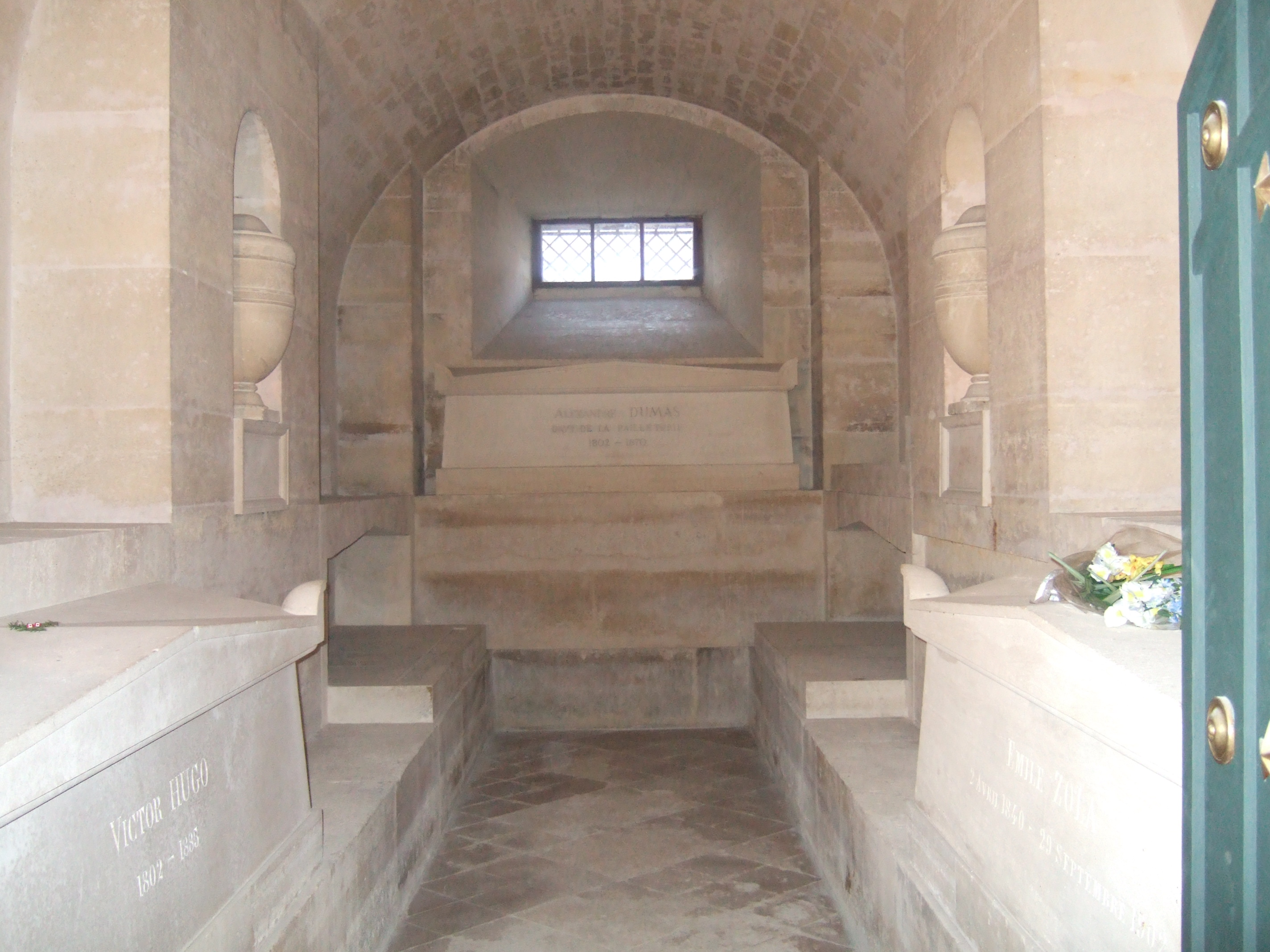
Tombs of Victor Hugo (left), Alexandre Dumas (center), and Emile Zola (right)

Interment in the crypt of the Panthéon is severely restricted and is allowed only by a parliamentary act for "National Heroes". Similar high honours exist in Les Invalides for historical military leaders such as Napoleon, Turenne and Vauban.

Among those buried in its necropolis are Voltaire, Rousseau, Victor Hugo, Émile Zola, Jean Moulin, Louis Braille, Jean Jaurès and Soufflot, its architect. In 1907 Marcellin Berthelot was buried with his wife Sophie Berthelot. Marie Skłodowska-Curie was interred in 1995, the first woman interred on merit. Geneviève de Gaulle-Anthonioz and Germaine Tillion, heroines of the French resistance, were interred in 2015. Simone Veil was interred in 2018, and her husband Antoine Veil was interred alongside her so that they would not be separated.

The widely repeated story that the remains of Voltaire were stolen by religious fanatics in 1814 and thrown into a garbage heap is false. Such rumours resulted in the coffin being opened in 1897, which confirmed that his remains were still present.

On 30 November 2002, in an elaborate but solemn procession, six Republican Guards carried the coffin of Alexandre Dumas (1802–1870), the author of The Three Musketeers and other famous novels, to the Panthéon. Draped in a blue-velvet cloth inscribed with the Musketeers' motto "Un pour tous, tous pour un" ("One for all, all for one"), the remains had been transported from their original interment site in the Cimetière de Villers-Cotterêts in Aisne, France. In his speech, President Jacques Chirac stated that an injustice was being corrected with the proper honouring of one of France's greatest authors.

In January 2007, President Jacques Chirac unveiled a plaque in the Panthéon to more than 2,600 people recognised as Righteous Among the Nations by the Yad Vashem memorial in Israel for saving the lives of Jews who would otherwise have been deported to concentration camps. The tribute in the Panthéon underlines the fact that around three-quarters of the country's Jewish population survived the war, often thanks to ordinary people who provided help at the risk of their own life.

This plaque says:

Sous la chape de haine et de nuit tombée sur la France dans les années d'Occupation, des lumières, par milliers, refusèrent de s'éteindre. Nommés "Justes parmi les nations" ou restés anonymes, des femmes et des hommes, de toutes origines et de toutes conditions, ont sauvé des juifs des persécutions antisémites et des camps d'extermination. Bravant les risques encourus, ils ont incarné l'honneur de la France, ses valeurs de justice, de tolérance et d'humanité.

Translation:

Under the cloak of hatred and darkness that spread over France during the years of [Nazi] occupation, thousands of lights refused to be extinguished. Named as "Righteous among the Nations" or remaining anonymous, women and men, of all backgrounds and social classes, saved Jews from anti-Semitic persecution and the extermination camps. Braving the risks involved, they embodied the honour of France, and its values of justice, tolerance and humanity.

=== People interred or commemorated ===
Year	Name	Lived	Profession	Burial	Picture	Notes
1791	Honoré Gabriel Riqueti, comte de Mirabeau	1749–1791	Revolutionary	—	—	First person honoured with burial in the Panthéon, 4 April 1791. Disinterred on 25 November 1794 and buried in an anonymous grave. His remains are yet to be recovered.
1791	Voltaire	1694–1778	Writer and philosopher	Entrée		
1792	Nicolas-Joseph Beaurepaire	1740–1792	Military officer	—	—	Remains since disappeared
1793	Louis Michel le Peletier de Saint-Fargeau	1760–1793	Politician	—	—	Assassinated deputy; disinterred from the Panthéon at the request of his family on 14 February 1795.
1793	Auguste Marie Henri Picot de Dampierre	1756–1793	Military officer	—	—	Remains since disappeared
1794	Jean-Paul Marat	1743–1793	Politician	—	—	Disinterred from the Panthéon.
1794	Jean-Jacques Rousseau	1712–1778	Writer and Philosopher	Entrée		
1806	François Denis Tronchet	1726–1806	Politician and lawyer	Crypt V		
1806	Claude-Louis Petiet	1749–1806	Politician	Crypt V		
1807	Jean-Étienne-Marie Portalis	1746–1807	Politician	Crypt V		
1807	Louis-Pierre-Pantaléon Resnier	1759–1807	Politician	Crypt V		
1807	Louis-Joseph-Charles-Amable d'Albert, duc de Luynes	1748–1807	Politician	—	—	Disinterred from the Panthéon in 1862 and returned to his family at their request.
1807	Jean-Baptiste-Pierre Bevière	1723–1807	Politician	Crypt V		
1808	François Barthélemy, comte Beguinot	1747–1808	Military officer	Crypt V		
1808	Pierre Jean Georges Cabanis	1757–1808	Scientist and philosopher	Crypt V		
1808	Gabriel-Louis, marquis de Caulaincourt	1741–1808	Military officer	Crypt V		
1808	Jean-Frédéric Perregaux	1744–1808	Banker	Crypt IV		
1808	Antoine-César de Choiseul, duc de Praslin	1756–1808	Military officer and politician	Crypt V		
1808	Jean-Pierre Firmin Malher	1761–1808	Military officer	Crypt V		Urn with his heart.
1809	Jean Baptiste Papin, comte de Saint-Christau	1756–1809	Politician and lawyer	Crypt V		
1809	Joseph-Marie Vien	1716–1809	Painter	Crypt III		
1809	Pierre Garnier de Laboissière	1755–1809	Military officer	Crypt III		
1809	Jean Pierre, comte Sers	1746–1809	Politician	Crypt III		Urn with his heart.
1809	Girolamo Luigi Durazzo	1739–1809	Politician	Crypt V		Urn with his heart.
1809	Justin Bonaventure Morard de Galles	1761–1809	Military officer	Crypt III		Urn with his heart.
1809	Emmanuel Crétet de Champmol	1747–1809	Politician	Crypt III		
1810	Cardinal Giovanni Battista Caprara	1733–1810	Clergyman	Crypt III		Heart buried in Milan Cathedral in 1810. Body disinterred from the Panthéon in 1861 and returned to his family at their request. His remains were transferred from Paris to Rome on 22 August 1861.
1810	Louis Charles Vincent Le Blond de Saint-Hilaire	1766–1809	Military officer	Crypt III		
1810	Jean-Baptiste Treilhard	1742–1810	Lawyer	Crypt III		
1810	Jean Lannes de Montebello	1769–1809	Military officer	Crypt XXII		
1810	Charles Pierre Claret de Fleurieu	1738–1810	Politician	Crypt III		
1811	Louis Antoine de Bougainville	1729–1811	Navigator	Crypt III		
1811	Cardinal Charles Erskine de Kellie	1739–1811	Clergyman	Crypt III		
1811	Alexandre-Antoine Hureau de Sénarmont	1769–1811	Military officer	Crypt III		Urn with his heart.
1811	Cardinal Ippolito Antonio Vincenti Mareri	1738–1811	Clergyman	Crypt III		In 1861 Cardinal François-Nicholas-Madeleine Morlot, Archbishop of Paris, established that some burials in the church had to be cleared. He notified a great-nephew of Cardinal Vincenti Mareri, who took care of transferring the deceased's bones to Italy. The solemn funeral took place in Rieti and the cardinal's body was placed in the family tomb in the chapel of Santa Caterina, next to the tomb of his brother Alessandro, in the Cathedral of Santa Maria Assunta.
1811	Nicolas Marie Songis des Courbons	1761–1811	Military officer	Crypt III		
1811	Michel Ordener, 1st Count Ordener	1755–1811	Military officer	Crypt II		
1812	Jean Marie Pierre Dorsenne	1773–1812	Military officer	Crypt II		
1812	Jan Willem de Winter	1761–1812	Military officer	Crypt IV		Heart buried in Kampen, Overijssel, Netherlands, his birthplace.
1813	Hyacinthe-Hugues-Timoléon de Cossé, Comte de Brissac	1746–1813	Military officer	Crypt II		
1813	Jean-Ignace Jacqueminot, Comte de Ham	1758–1813	Lawyer	Crypt II		
1813	Joseph-Louis Lagrange	1736–1813	Mathematician	Crypt II		
1813	Jean Rousseau	1738–1813	Politician	Crypt II		
1813	Justin de Viry	1737–1813	Politician	Crypt II		
1814	Frédéric Henri Walther	1761–1813	Military officer	Crypt IV		
1814	Jean-Nicolas Démeunier	1751–1814	Politician	Crypt II		
1814	Jean-Louis-Ébénézer Reynier	1771–1814	Military officer	Crypt IV		
1814	Claude Ambroise Régnier de Massa di Carrara	1746–1814	Politician and lawyer	Crypt II		
1815	Antoine-Jean-Marie Thévenard	1733–1815	Military officer	Crypt II		
1815	Claude-Juste-Alexandre Legrand	1762–1815	Military officer	Crypt II		
1829	Jacques-Germain Soufflot	1713–1780	Architect of the Pantheon	Entrée		
1885	Victor Hugo	1802–1885	Writer	Crypt XXIV		
1889	Lazare Carnot	1753–1823	Politician and scientist	Crypt XXIII		Transferred to the Panthéon at the centennial of the French Revolution.
1889	Jean-Baptiste Baudin	1811–1851	Politician and doctor	Crypt XXIII		Transferred to the Panthéon at the centennial of the French Revolution.
1889	Théophile Corret de la Tour d'Auvergne	1743–1800	Military officer	Crypt XXIII		Transferred to the Panthéon at the centennial of the French Revolution.
1889	François Séverin Marceau	1769–1796	Military officer	Crypt XXIII		Ashes transferred to the Panthéon from Koblenz, Germany, at the centennial of the French Revolution.
1894	Marie François Sadi Carnot	1837–1894	President of France	Crypt XXIII		Buried in the Panthéon immediately after his assassination.
1907	Marcellin Berthelot	1827–1907	Scientist	Crypt XXV		Buried with his wife Sophie Berthelot, as he refused to be buried apart from her.
1907	Sophie Berthelot	1837–1907	Wife of Marcellin Berthelot	Crypt XXV		Transferred to the Panthéon with her husband Marcellin Berthelot, who had refused to be buried apart from her. The first woman to be interred in the Panthéon.
1908	Émile Zola	1840–1902	Writer	Crypt XXIV		Transferred to the Panthéon from Montmartre Cemetery.
1920	Léon Gambetta	1838–1882	Politician	Escalier d'accès		Urn with his heart.
1924	Jean Jaurès	1859–1914	Politician	Crypt XXVI		Transferred to the Panthéon ten years after his assassination
1933	Paul Painlevé	1863–1933	Mathematician and politician	Crypt XXV		
1948	Paul Langevin	1872–1946	Scientist	Crypt XXV		Transferred to the Panthéon the same day as Jean Perrin.
1948	Jean Perrin; Nobel Laureate	1870–1942	Scientist	Crypt XXV		Transferred to the Panthéon the same day as Paul Langevin. Repatriated from New York City, US.
1949	Victor Schœlcher	1804–1893	Abolitionist	Crypt XXVI		Transferred to the Panthéon the same day as Félix Éboué. Transferred from Père Lachaise Cemetery. Victor Schœlcher had wanted to be buried with his father Marc, who was therefore also interred in the Panthéon.
1949	Marc Schœlcher	1766–1832	Father of Victor Schœlcher	Crypt XXVI		Transferred to the Panthéon the same day as Victor Schœlcher. Transferred from Père Lachaise Cemetery. Victor had wanted to be buried with his father who was therefore is also interred in the Panthéon.
1949	Félix Éboué	1884–1944	Politician	Crypt XXVI		Transferred to the Panthéon the same day as Victor Schœlcher.
1952	Louis Braille	1809–1852	Educator	Crypt XXV		Transferred to the Panthéon on the centenary of his death.
1964	Jean Moulin	1899–1943	Résistant	Crypt VI		Ashes transferred to the Panthéon from Père Lachaise Cemetery on 19 December 1964.
1967	Antoine de Saint-Exupéry	1900–1944	Writer	—		Commemorated with an inscription in November 1967, as his body was never found following an aerial dog fight over the Mediterranean near Marseille.
1987	René Cassin; Nobel Laureate	1887–1976	Human rights activist	Crypt VI		Transferred to the Panthéon on the centenary of his birth. Transferred from Montparnasse Cemetery.
1988	Jean Monnet	1888–1979	Economist	Crypt VI		Transferred to the Panthéon on the centenary of his birth.
1989	Abbé Henri Grégoire	1750–1831	Clergyman	Crypt VII		Transferred to the Panthéon at the bicentennial of the French Revolution.
1989	Gaspard Monge	1746–1818	Mathematician	Crypt VII		Transferred to the Panthéon at the bicentennial of the French Revolution.
1989	Nicolas de Condorcet	1743–1794	Politician	Crypt VII		Symbolic interment at the bicentennial of the French Revolution. His coffin at the Panthéon empty, his remains having been lost.
1995	Pierre Curie; Nobel Laureate (1903)	1859–1906	Scientist	Crypt VIII		Transferred to the Panthéon in April 1995 with his wife and fellow physicist Marie Curie.
1995	Marie Skłodowska Curie; Nobel Laureate (1903 and 1911)	1867–1934	Scientist	Crypt VIII		Second woman to be buried in the Panthéon, but the first to be honoured on her own merit.
1996	André Malraux	1901–1976	Writer and politician	Crypt VI		Ashes transferred to the Panthéon from Verrières-le-Buisson (Essonne) Cemetery on 23 November 1996 on the 20th anniversary of his death.
1998	Toussaint Louverture	1743–1803	Military officer	—		Commemorative plaque installed on same day as that for Louis Delgrès.
1998	Louis Delgrès	1766–1802	Politician	—		Commemorative plaque installed on same day as that for Toussaint Louverture.
2002	Alexandre Dumas	1802–1870	Writer	Crypt XXIV		Transferred to the Panthéon 132 years after his death.
2011	Aimé Césaire	1913–2008	Writer and politician	—		Commemorative plaque installed 6 April 2011; Césaire is buried in Martinique.
2015	Jean Zay	1904–1944	Politician	Crypt IX		Murdered at Molles in Allier and previously buried in Orléans in 1948.
2015	Pierre Brossolette	1903–1944	Résistant	Crypt IX		Ashes transferred to the Panthéon from Père Lachaise Cemetery on 27 May 2015.
2015	Germaine Tillion	1907–2008	Résistante	Crypt IX		Symbolic interment. The coffin of Germaine Tillion at the Panthéon does not contain her remains but soil from her gravesite, because her family did not want the body itself moved.
2015	Geneviève de Gaulle-Anthonioz	1920–2002	Résistante	Crypt IX		Symbolic interment. The coffin of Geneviève de Gaulle-Anthonioz at the Panthéon does not contain her remains but soil from her gravesite, because her family did not want the body itself moved.
2018	Simone Veil	1927–2017	Politician, Holocaust survivor	Crypt VI		Originally buried at Montparnasse Cemetery following her death in 2017.
2018	Antoine Veil	1926–2013	Husband of Simone Veil	Crypt VI		Transferred to the Panthéon with his wife Simone Veil. Originally buried at Montparnasse Cemetery following his death in 2013.
2020	Maurice Genevoix	1890–1980	Writer	Crypt XIII		Originally buried at Passy Cemetery following his death in 1980.
2021	Josephine Baker	1906–1975	Résistante, entertainer, civil rights activist	Crypt XIII		Symbolic interment. Baker's cenotaph contains soil from her birthplace in Missouri, from France, and from her final resting place in Monaco Cemetery.
2024	Missak Manouchian	1906–1944	Resistance fighter	Crypt XIII		Was interred on the 21 February 2024 with his wife Mélinée.
2024	Mélinée Manouchian	1913–1989	Wife of Missak Manouchian	Crypt XIII		Was interred on the 21 February 2024 with her husband Missak.
2025	Robert Badinter	1928–2024	Human rights activist	Crypt XIII		
2026	Marc Bloch	1886–1944	Historian	Crypt XIII		On November 23, 2024, French President Emmanuel Macron announced that Marc Bloch would be reburied in the Pantheon in recognition of his dual contributions to intellectual life and the struggle for freedom during one of France's darkest periods. His casket will be interred alongside his wife's, though his ashes will remain in a village in central France at his family's request.
2026	Simonne Vidal	1894–1944	Historian	Crypt XIII		Interred with her husband to acknowledge her contributions to their work. Symbolic interrment, as her remains had been buried in a common grave.

== See also ==
- The Apotheosis of Washington – dome fresco of the U.S. Capitol
- Church of Santa Engrácia
- 18th-century Western domes
- List of tallest domes
- List of tourist attractions in Paris
- List of works by Jean Antoine Injalbert – including the statue of Mirabeau
- Panthéon Club
- Pantheon, Moscow
- Panteón Nacional
- Pantheon, Rome

== Sources ==
- Lebeurre, Alexia (2000). The Pantheon: Temple of the Nation. Paris: Éditions du Patrimoine. ISBN 978-2858223435.
- Oudin, Bernard (1994). Dictionnaire des Architectes (in French). Seghers. ISBN 2232103986.
- Gilks, David (2024). Quatremère de Quincy: Art and Politics during the French Revolution. Oxford University Press. ISBN 978-0198745563.
