= Augustin Fliche =

French historian (1884–1951)

Augustin Fliche (19 November 1884, in Montpellier – 19 November 1951) was a 20th-century French historian who mainly dealt with the history of the Church in the Middle Ages. He was a professor at the University of Montpellier and also visiting professor at the University of Leuven in 1925–1927 and 1946–1947.

He is known among other things for a biography of Philip I of France and another one of Pope Gregory VII with his reforms. He also wrote overviews of the history of the Middle Ages.

From 1935, he directed with Victor Martin a Histoire de l'Église depuis les origines jusqu'à nos jours published by Bloud and Gay.

In 1941, he was elected a member of the Académie des Inscriptions et Belles-Lettres.

He was opposed to both the educational theories of Marc Bloch and Bloch personally, probably, suggests Eugen Weber, due to Fliche's innate antisemitism and the fact that Bloch had once given one of Fliche's pieces a poor review.

== Works ==
- 1912: Le Règne de Philippe Ier, roi de France (1060–1108). Paris, Société française d'imprimerie et de librairie, Archive.
- 1912: Les Vies de Saint Savinien. Premier évêque de Sens : étude critique suivie d'une édition de la plus ancienne vita. Société française d'Imprimerie et de Librairie, Archive (on Savinien de Sens, first bishop of Sens, Yonne in the 3rd century).
- 1916: Études sur la polémique religieuse à l'époque de Grégoire VII. Société française d'Imprimerie et de Librairie, Paris Archive.
- 1920: Saint Grégoire VII. Lecoffre, Archive
- 1924–1937: La Réforme grégorienne, 3 volumes. Louvain
- 1929: La Chrétienté médiévale 395-1254. Histoire du monde, VII/2
- 1930: L'Europe occidentale de 888 à 1125. Histoire générale. Histoire du moyen âge, II.
- 1946: with R. Foreville, Jean Rousset : La Réforme grégorienne et la reconquête chrétienne (1057–1123). Histoire de l'église depuis les origines jusqu'à nos jours, Teilband 8. Bloud & Gay, Paris
- 1946: La querelle des investitures. Aubier, Éditions Montaigne
- 1948: with Christine Thouzellier, Yvonne Azais : Du premier concile du Latran à l'avènement d'Innocent III (1123–1198). Histoire de l'église depuis les origines jusqu'à nos jours, Fascicule 9. Bloud & Gay
- 1950: with Christine Thouzellier, Yvonne Azais : La Chrétienté romaine (1198–1274). Histoire de l'église depuis les origines jusqu'à nos jours, Fascicule 10. Bloud & Gay

== Bibliography ==
- Ganshof, François Louis (1952). "Augustin Fliche (1884-1951)". Revue belge de philologie et d'histoire. Vol. 30, fasc. 1-2. pp. 649–651.
- Weber, E. (1991). My France: Politics, Culture, Myth. Cambridge, MA: Harvard University Press. ISBN 978-0-67459-576-7.
