= Stephan R. Epstein =

Stephan R. Epstein (15 March 1960 – 3 February 2007), known as "Larry", was a British economic historian, and a professor at the London School of Economics.

Brought up in Switzerland, he studied at the University of Siena, and later received a PhD from the University of Cambridge. In 1992 he was made a lecturer in economic history at the LSE, by 1997 he had been appointed reader, and in 2001 professor.

Epstein's PhD thesis was on economic development and social transformation in late medieval Sicily. Later he expanded his research to a greater European scale, with his 2000 book Freedom and Growth, where he explored the interaction between state formation and economic development. For this work he won the Ranki Prize for a book on European economic history in 2001. Epstein also worked on the history of technology, and on the influence of guilds on technological development in medieval Europe.

== Publications ==
- Freedom and Growth: The Rise of States and Markets in Europe, 1300–1750, Routledge, 2000, ISBN 9780415771153
- An Island for Itself: Economic Development and Social Change in Late Medieval Sicily, Cambridge University Press, 1992, ISBN 0-521-52507-1
- Alle origini della fattoria toscana: L'ospedale di Siena e le sue terre (metà '200–metà '400), Firenze: Salimbeni, 1986
