= Antinational =

Antinational may mean:

- Opposed to nationalism
- Not patriotic
- A person who is against their own nation
  - A traitor to a nation
- Anti-national (India), a pejorative label and political catchphrase in Indian politics

== See also ==
- Transnational (disambiguation)
- Apatrid
- Denationalisation
