= Annales. Histoire, Sciences Sociales =

- Discipline: Social history
- Language: French
- Edited by: Guillaume Calafat

Publication details
- Former names: Annales d'histoire économique et sociale (1929 to 1939), Annales d'histoire sociale (1939–1942, 1945), Mélanges d'histoire sociale (1942–1944), Annales. Economies, sociétés, civilisations (1946–1994), Annales. Histoire, Sciences Sociales (1994-present)
- History: 1929-present
- Publisher: EHESS in partnership with Cambridge University Press (France)
- Frequency: Quarterly

Standard abbreviations
- ISO 4: Ann., Hist. Sci. Soc.

Indexing
- ISSN: 0395-2649
- LCCN: 49012430
- OCLC no.: 436601008

Links
- Journal homepage

Annales. Histoire, Sciences Sociales is a French academic journal covering social history that was established in 1929 by Marc Bloch and Lucien Febvre. The journal gave rise to an approach to history known as the Annales School. The journal began in Strasbourg as Annales d'histoire économique et sociale, but moved to Paris in 1929 and kept the same name from 1929 to 1939. It was successively renamed Annales d'histoire sociale (1939–1942, 1945), Mélanges d'histoire sociale (1942–1944), Annales. Economies, sociétés, civilisations (1946–1994), and, finally, Annales. Histoire, Sciences Sociales in 1994. In 2013 it began publication of an English language edition, with all the articles translated.

The scope of topics covered by the journal is wide, but the emphasis is on social history and long-term trends (longue durée), often using quantification and paying special attention to geography and to the intellectual world view of common people, or "mentality" (mentalité). Less attention is paid to political, diplomatic, or military history, or to biographies of famous men. Instead, the Annales focused attention on the synthesizing of historical patterns identified from social, economic, and cultural history, statistics, medical reports, family studies, and even psychoanalysis. It is one of the main French outlets for research in historical anthropology.

In 2017 the EHESS formed a partnership with Cambridge University Press to publish both the French and English editions of the Annales. English articles are now published in FirstView.

== See also ==
- World-systems theory
