= Gustave Bloch =

French historian (1848–1923)

Gustave Bloch

Gustave Bloch (21 July 1848 – 3 December 1923) was a French Jewish historian of ancient history. He was the father of historian Marc Bloch (1886–1944), who along with Lucien Febvre (1878–1956) was co-founder of the École des Annales.

== Biographical sketch ==
Born in Fegersheim, Bas-Rhin, Bloch received his agrégation in 1872, and during the following year began teaching classes in rhetoric at Lycée de Besançon. In 1876, he became a lecturer, and several years later started work as a professor of Greek and Roman antiquities at the University of Lyon. Beginning in 1888, he taught history at the École Normale Supérieure, where he succeeded historian Paul Guiraud (1850–1907). From 1904 to 1919, he was a professor of Roman history at the Faculté des lettres de Paris.

== Selected writings ==
- "La République romaine. Les Conflits politiques et sociaux", in The Roman Republic. Political and Social Conflicts (1913).
- "L'Empire romain. Evolution et décadence", in The Roman Empire. Evolution and Decadence (1922).

== Bibliography ==
- Rhetorical connections and networks in the nineteenth century (biographical information)
- Members of École Française d'Athenes
