= Simonne Vidal =

Wife and assistant of Marc Bloch (1894–1944)

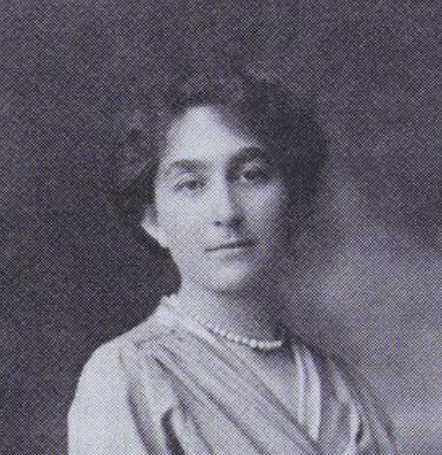
- Vidal, c. 1919
- Born: February 14, 1894; Dieppe, French Third Republic
- Died: July 2, 1944 (aged 50); Lyon, Vichy France
- Resting place: Le Bourg-d'Hem
- Spouse: Marc Bloch

Simonne Jeanne Myriam Vidal (French: [si.mɔn ʒan mi.ʁjam vi.dal]; 14 February 1894 – 2 July 1944) was a French housewife whose husband was the historian Marc Bloch. Throughout their marriage, Vidal played a significant role—as a secretary and as a research assistant—in Bloch's work. She was also a hospital volunteer in both World Wars.

Vidal was born in Dieppe in a wealthy Jewish family. In 1916, during the First World War, she volunteered as a nurse. She was decorated for her work with prisoners and refugees. Vidal married Marc Bloch in 1919, after which the couple moved to Strasbourg. All six of their children were born there. Vidal and Bloch's marriage was described as strong and loving. She served as her husband's secretary, research assistant and interlocutor, playing a significant role in his historical work.

The Second World War led the Bloch family to move frequently within France. Vidal's fragile health was tested during those years, and she often had to raise her children alone due to her husband's mobilization. During that period, she again volunteered as a nurse in Paris. When France was occupied and Bloch joined the French Resistance, Vidal helped him by sending food and supplies to his base in Lyon. When he was arrested by the Gestapo, she travelled there, where she was hospitalized for an undiagnosed stomach cancer. She died in the hospital under a false name two weeks after her husband was executed, and was buried in a common grave. In 2024, it was announced that she would enter the Panthéon, along with Bloch.

== Early life ==
Simonne Vidal was born in Dieppe, in the French region of Normandy, on February 14, 1894. She was the third child of Paul Vidal, a successful engineer, and his wife Alice Hirsch. (Note: Simonne's siblings included Jacques, the elder brother, and Jeanne, a younger sister. Jeanne died in Auschwitz in 1944.) The Vidal family was part of the Jewish bourgeoisie and came from a tradition of engineers and manufacturers. It was notably related to the Dreyfuses. Simonne Vidal was described as being gifted in music and foreign languages. When she was twenty years old, in 1914, World War I broke out. She volunteered as a nurse in 1916, working with prisoners and refugees in Dieppe, and was decorated for her service.

== Marriage to Marc Bloch ==
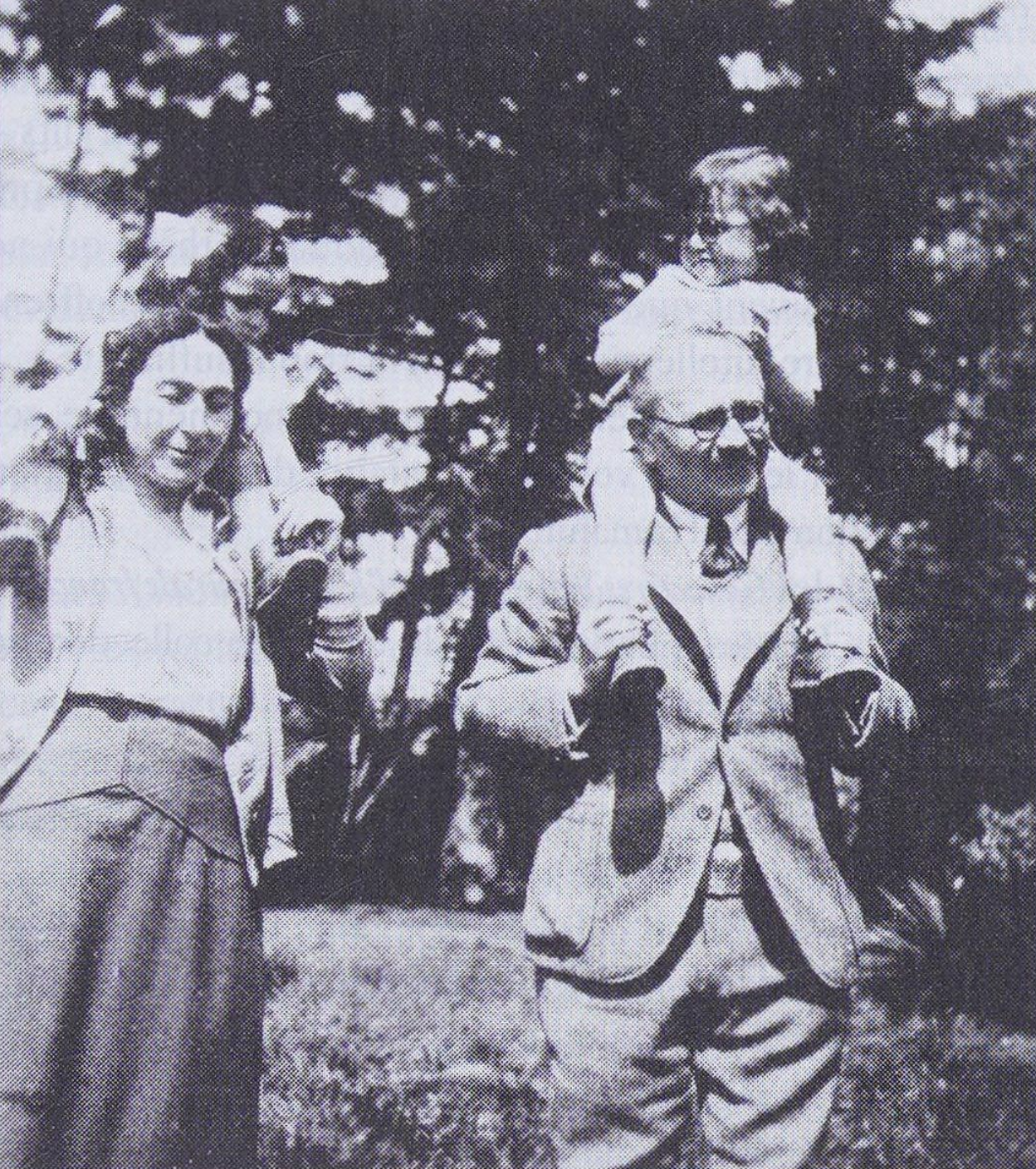
Vidal, her husband and their two youngest children in the early 1930s

Vidal married Marc Bloch in Paris on July 19, 1919. Bloch had returned from his own military service in World War I four months earlier. The couple held a religious ceremony four days after the wedding, in Buffault Synagogue. Vidal's family provided Bloch with a substantial dowry. In the fall, the couple moved to Strasbourg after Bloch joined the faculty of the University of Strasbourg. They lived in Strasbourg for seventeen years, and all six of their children—starting with Alice, born in 1920—were born there.

Vidal's second child, Étienne Bloch, described his mother as "an excellent housekeeper, managing her little world with skill and efficiency". He described her union to his father as loving and unbreakable. (Note: In a 1939 letter to his eldest son, Marc Bloch wrote: "I was never a heartbreaker; certainly not! That didn’t stop me from meeting your mother, from having the immense happiness of pleasing her, and from living with her a life of complete unity, one so beautiful that I couldn’t wish for you, as the crowning achievement of your own sentimental life — no matter what it may have been before —, anything more beautiful.") In addition to Vidal's household work, she also served as her husband's secretary—transcribing his manuscripts—and as his research assistant. Sharing many of his interests, she was seemingly also his favorite interlocutor. Her role in her husband's work initially went unrecognized. In 2005, Étienne Bloch wrote: "Would Marc Bloch have become the great, globally recognized historian without his wife? I doubt it."

== World War II and death ==
In August of 1936, the Bloch family moved from Strasbourg to Paris. Earlier that year, following Hitler's remilitarisation of the Rhineland, Marc Bloch had shared with Lucien Febvre his concern about living near the German border. On August 24, 1939, a week before the beginning of World War II, he was mobilized in Alsace. Due to the threat of large cities being bombarded, Vidal and he decided to move the family to the village of Guéret, near their country house in Fougères. The apartment in Guéret was much less comfortable than what they were used to, and Vidal—whose health was fragile—was in charge of raising five of her children there, with the help of a maid. The area experienced significant bombardment after Italy joined the war against France.

During the fighting Vidal volunteered part-time in a Paris hospital. When the Armistice of 22 June 1940 was signed, she was in the occupied zone of France, along with one of her sons, in order to retrieve her mother-in-law in Marlotte and bring her to Guéret, in the zone libre. On their way back, they saw a German military column and were forced to turn back, eventually staying in Paris for a week. There, Vidal was able to obtain German permission for everyone to cross back into the zone libre. After Marc Bloch returned from the war, the family moved to a small apartment in Clermont-Ferrand, where Bloch was able to join the relocated faculty of the University of Strasbourg.

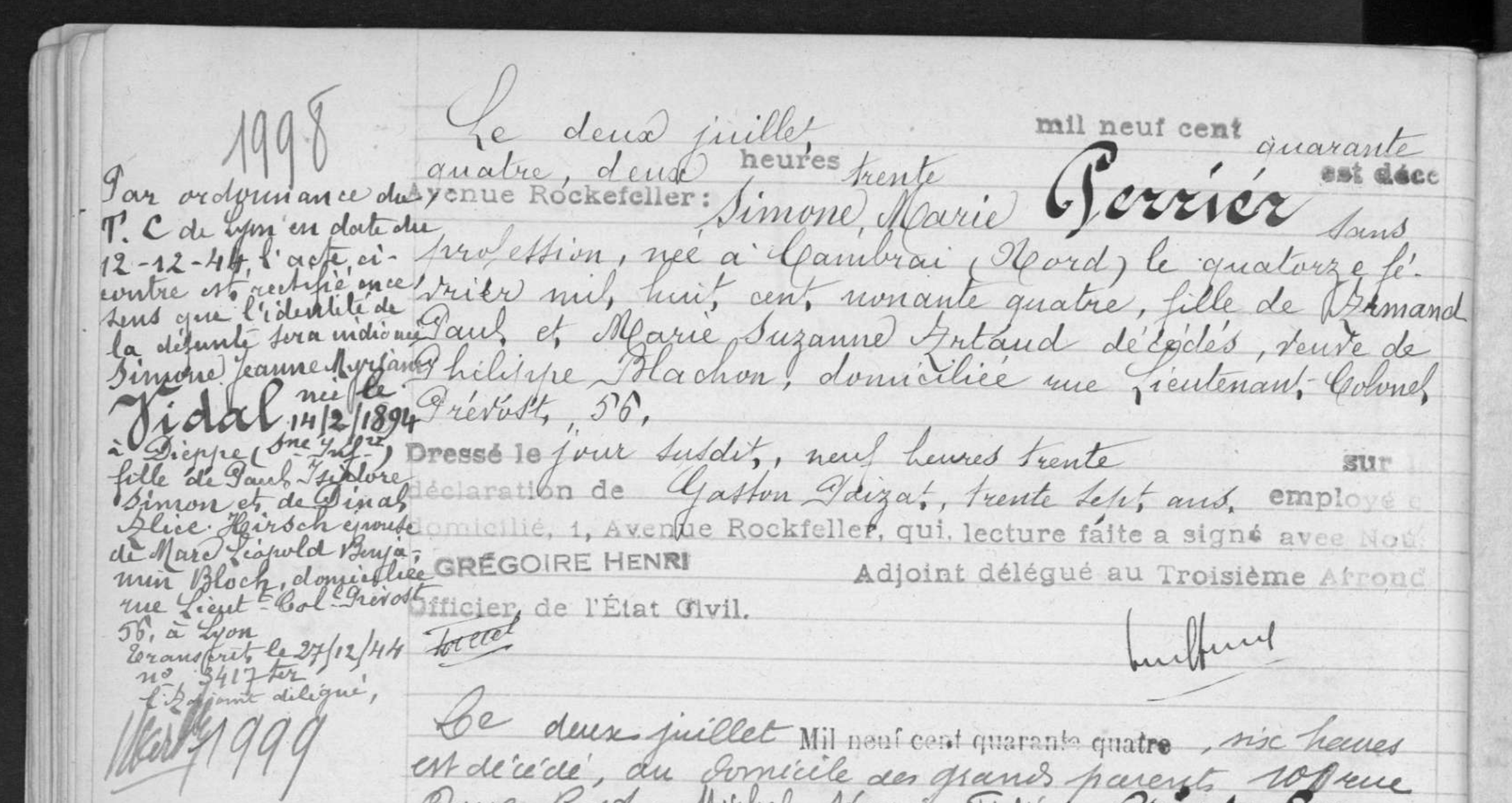
Vidal's death record, under the name of "Simone Perrier". A correction with her real name was later added in the left margin

Simonne Vidal was prone to sickness during those years. On April 12, 1941, she suffered an attack of pleurisy. In the hopes of improving her health, Marc Bloch obtained a teaching post in Montpellier, a warmer city by the Mediterranean, and had their family move there later that year. Around the time of the invasion of the zone libre, which occurred on November 11, 1942, Bloch joined the French Resistance. While he was living under a false identity near Lyon, his wife regularly sent him food, clothes, books and supplies. She occasionally visited him. Bloch was arrested by the Gestapo on March 8, 1944. His last letter to his wife, sent that morning, read: "Despite your courage and reason, I imagine you being a bit troubled by all the decisions to make. Sorry for being so far away."

Worried about her husband, Vidal travelled to Lyon with her daughter Alice. There she was hospitalized (under a false name) for an undiagnosed stomach cancer. She died after surgery, likely without knowing that her husband had been summarily executed two weeks earlier. She was buried in a common grave. A plaque in her name, however, is on the family vault, located in the cemetery of Le Bourg-d'Hem, near their country house. In 2024, French president Emmanuel Macron announced that Marc Bloch and Simonne Vidal would enter the Panthéon, through a cenotaph.

== Gallery ==
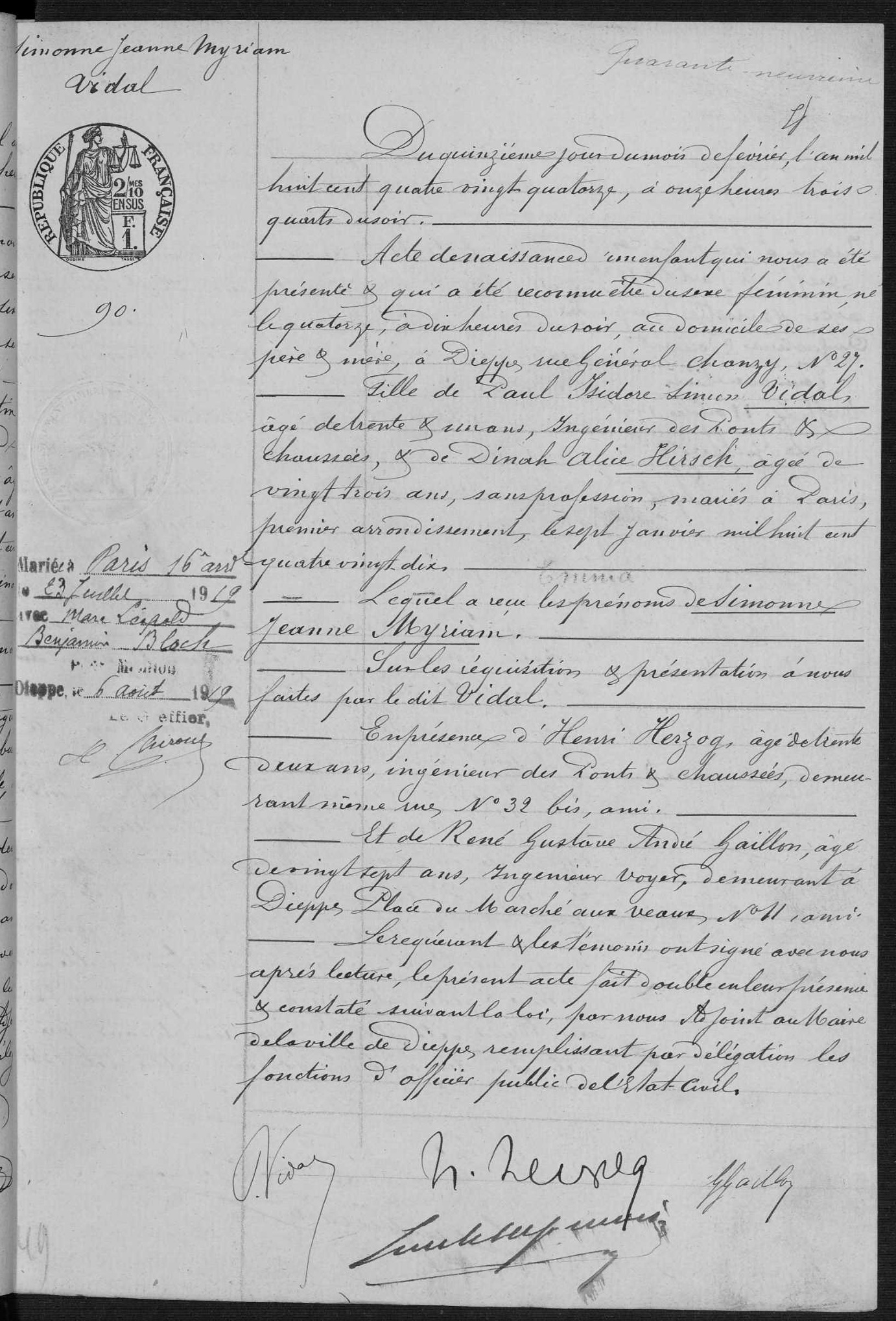
Vidal's birth record

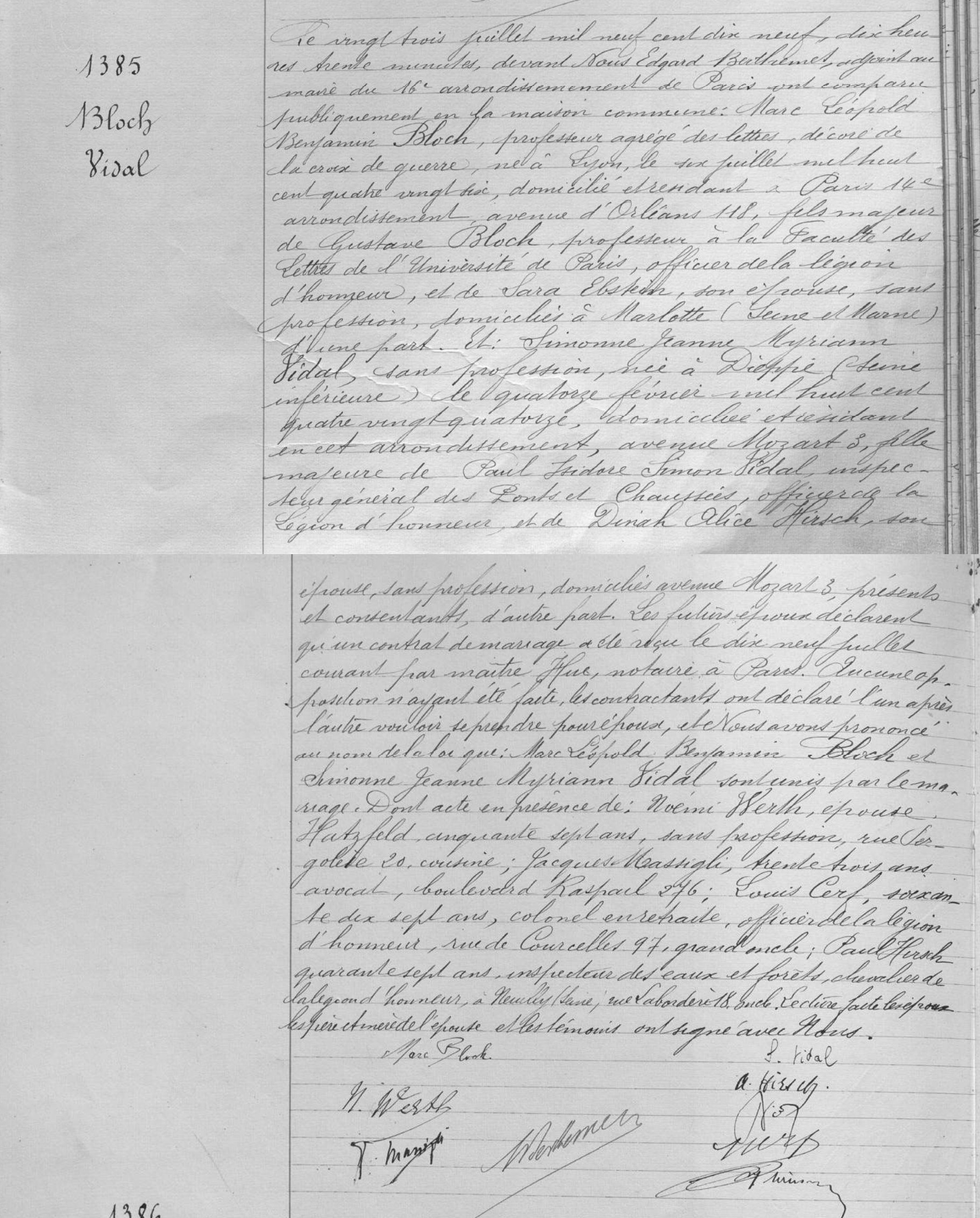
Vidal and Bloch's marriage record

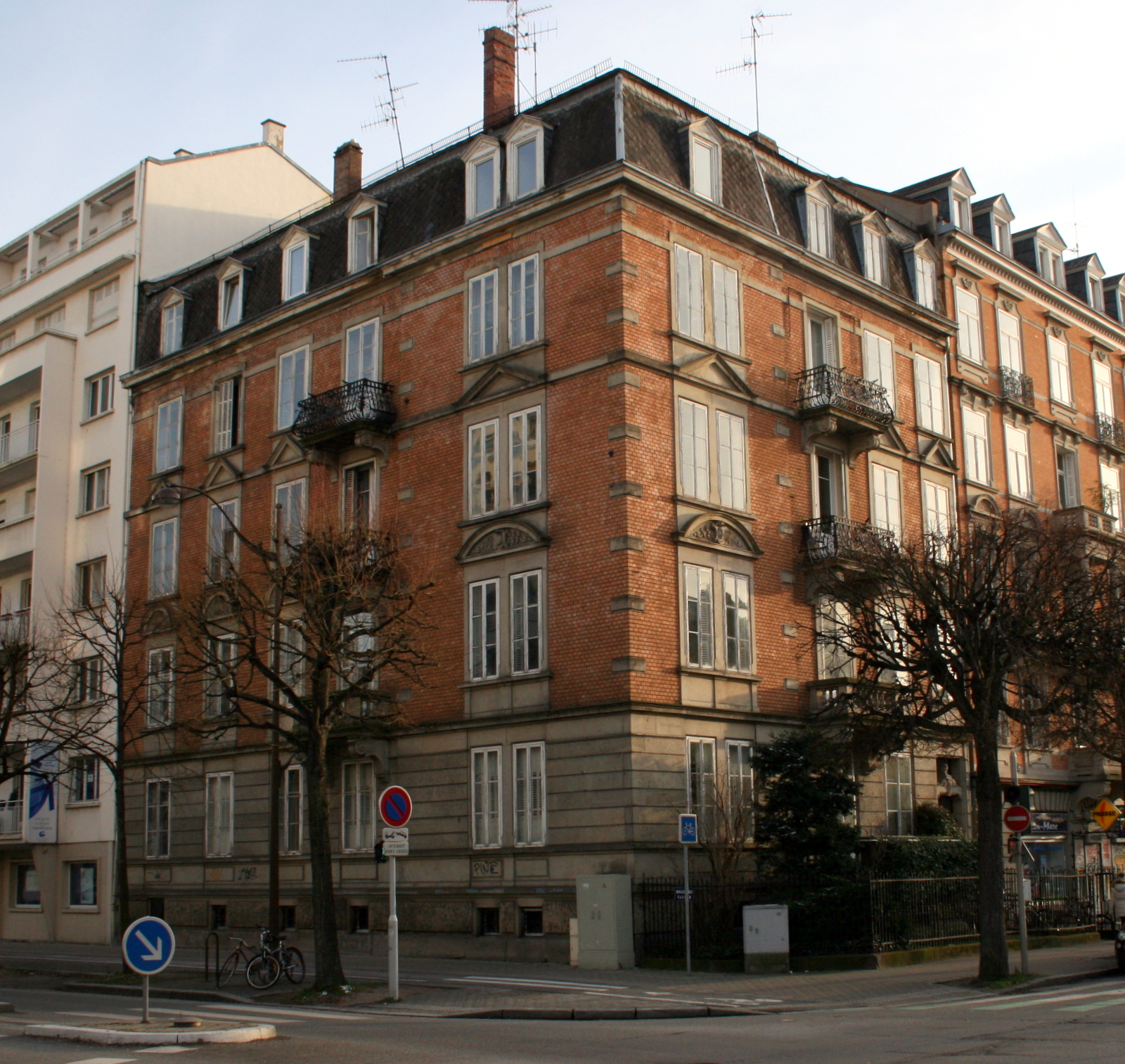
The Blochs' first address in Strasbourg, 48a Allée de la Robertsau

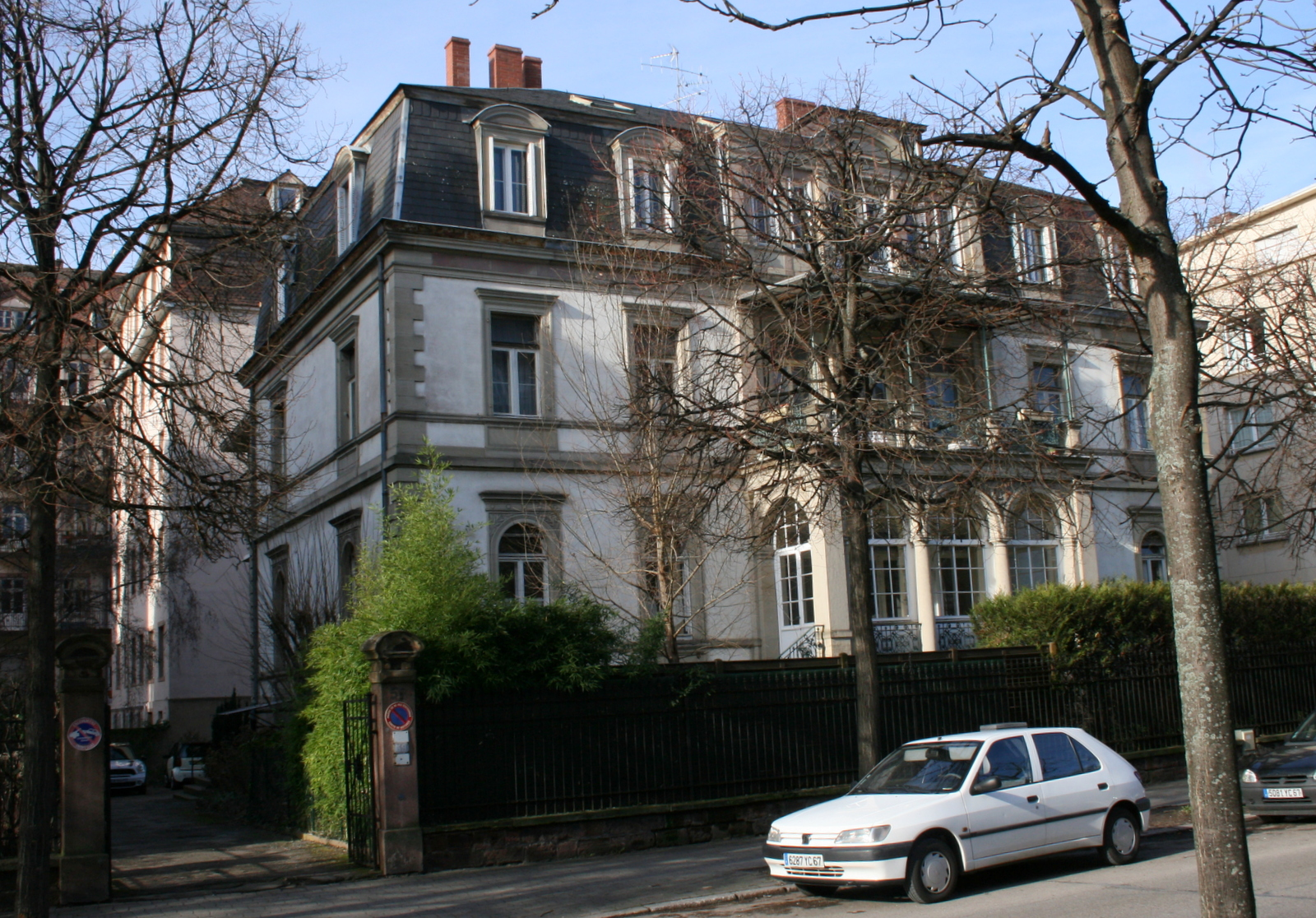
Second address in Strasbourg, 59 Allée de la Robertsau
