= André Burguière =

French historian and academic (1938–2026)

- Born: 10 October 1938; Paris, France
- Died: 22 January 2026 (aged 87); Paris, France
- Education: École normale supérieure
- Occupations: Historian, academic

André Burguière (French: [ɑ̃dʁe byʁɡjɛʁ]; 10 October 1938 – 22 January 2026) was a French historian and academic.

Burguière was a longtime director of studies at the School for Advanced Studies in the Social Sciences and was politically active with the Unified Socialist Party. In 2007, he published a piece in Le Nouvel Observateur in support of Ségolène Royal in the presidential election. He did the same for François Hollande in 2012.

Burguière died in Paris on 22 January 2026, at the age of 87.

== Publications ==
- Bretons de Plozévet (1975)
- Le Tiers-monde et la gauche (1979)
- Regards sur la France : un peuple dans son histoire (1982)
- Dictionnaire des sciences historiques (1986)
- Histoire de la famille (1986)
- Marc Bloch aujourd'hui : histoire comparée et sciences sociales (1990)
- Paysages et paysans (1991)
- Histoire de la France (2001)
- Une histoire anthropologique de l'Islam méditerranéen : mélanges offerts à Lucette Valensi (2002)
- The Construction of Minorities ; Cases for Comparison across Time and around the World (2003)
- La famille en Occident du XVIe au XVIIIe siècle (2005)
- L'École des Annales : une histoire intellectuelle (2006)
- Le mariage et l'amour en France de la Renaissance à la Révolution (2011)
- La gauche va-t-elle disparaître ? (2017)
