= Les Rois thaumaturges =

1924 work by historian Marc Bloch

The Royal Touch: Sacred Monarchy and Scrofula in England and France
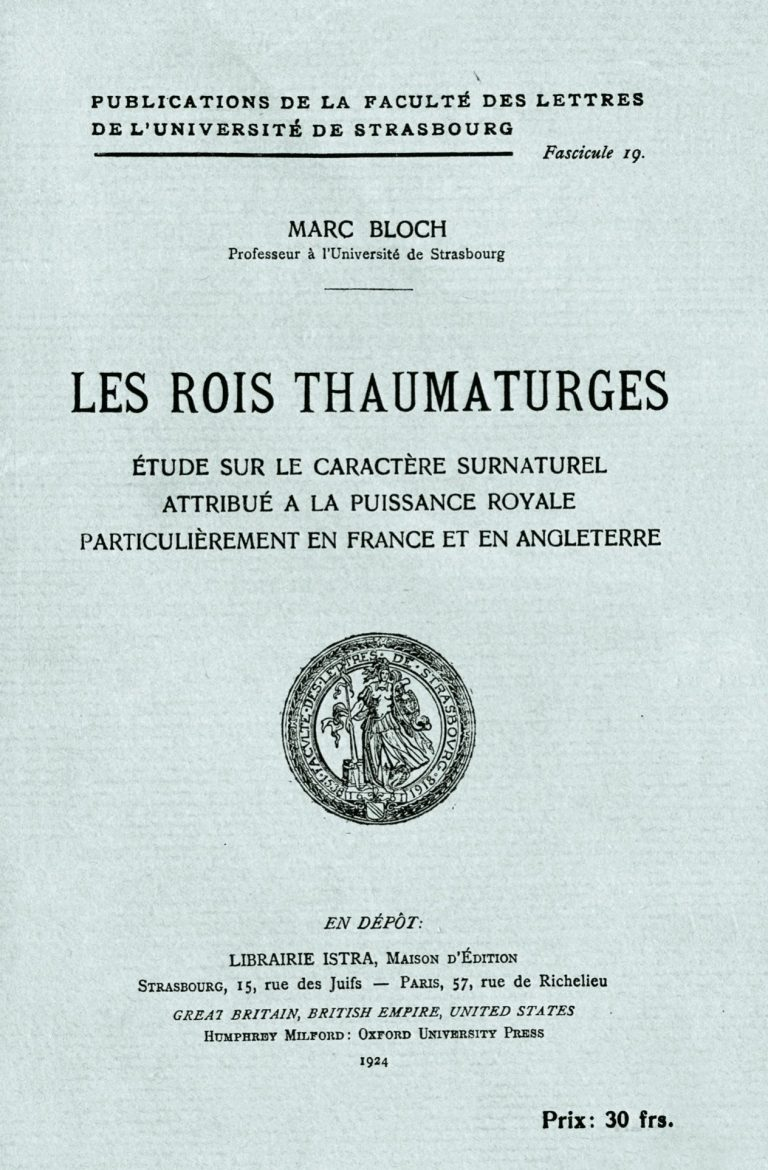
- Author: Marc Bloch
- Original title: Les Rois thaumaturges: Étude sur le caractère supernaturel attribué à la puissance royale particulièrement en France et en Angleterre
- Translator: J.E. Anderson
- Language: French
- Genre: Non-fiction
- Publication date: 1924

Les Rois thaumaturges: Étude sur le caractère supernaturel attribué à la puissance royale particulièrement en France et en Angleterre ('The Royal touch: Sacred Monarchy and Scrofula in England and France') is a work by historian Marc Bloch first published in 1924. It deals with the miraculous powers attributed to the Kings of France and the Kings of England, the most famous of which is the healing of scrofula by touch. Also known as the King's Evil, it was "an extremely frequent and dreaded ailment in Europe at the time" (p. 39). This is a groundbreaking book, as its approach draws on historical anthropology, Marc Bloch introduced anthropology, history of mentalities and comparative history into historical studies, heralding the historiographical revolution of the Annales.

== Structure and contents ==
The fourteen-page bibliography is followed by an introduction explaining Bloch's approach and outlining the difficulties encountered, particularly with regard to sources. The body of the work is then divided into three books of very unequal lengths. The first book, "Les origines" (Origins), comprises two chapters, and shows how the thaumaturgical powers of the kings of France and England came into being. The second book, Grandeur et vicissitudes des royautés thaumaturgiques (Greatness and vicissitudes of thaumaturgical kingdoms), the most extensive with six chapters, analyzes the rites surrounding these powers and presents these elements in chronological sequence, illustrating their evolution until they disappeared. The final book, L'interprétation critique du miracle royal (Critical Interpretation of the Royal Miracle), contains a single chapter outlining attempts to explain miracles rationally, and showing how people came to believe in them. Marc Bloch, a profound rationalist, concludes that it was a collective error.

Five appendices follow: "The royal miracle in French and English accounting books", "An iconographic dossier", "The beginnings of royal anointing and coronations", "Analysis and excerpts from Traité du sacre by Jean Golein" and "The French kings' pilgrimage to Corbeny after the coronation and the transport of saint Marculf's shrine to Reims", plus six pages of additions and corrections.

This is an analysis of the royal figure in the Middle Ages, of all the symbols, values and ideal and material expressions of power that princes used not only to give prestige to the monarch's image, but also to provide a kind of justification for their temporal power. Giving the king a sacred character was a means of consolidating monarchical power over the people, in a feudal system where God's grace was (in theory) the fundamental requirement for ascending the throne. Unlike the Roman pontiff or the Byzantine emperor, heirs to the Church of Christ, directors of spirituality and spokesmen of the Creator's own will, temporal princes had to constantly "reinvent" the concept of their sacred, i.e. God-given, right to rule Christian kingdoms.

Over time, people came to think of the sovereign as a man of exceptional nobility, above the "simple folk", a man touched by divine grace. As such, he manifests the abilities and powers that, in the collective imagination, appear as a true sign of divine benevolence.

Marc Bloch cites more than just the power to cure plague and scrofula. In the introduction to his essay, he recalls Edward III of England's message to Philip VI of France, in which he orders him to abdicate the throne as unworthy of the title, since he is not directly descended from the legitimate line and is therefore not worthy of being consecrated to reign; if he wished to avoid a war (the one that came to be known as the Hundred Years' War), he would have to show the qualities proper to a sovereign: fight the other suitor in a fair duel, where God would judge who deserved the throne, or expose himself to hungry lions inside a cage, because the lion, a proud and noble animal, would never attack a legitimate sovereign. Here, then, is the idea of the king situated above other men manifesting itself once again, in a different form.

Temporal and spiritual power found in these manifestations of supernatural ability and quality a common cement to unite the two powers. Indeed, it was customary for princes to attend the sick during a solemn mass, celebrated by France's highest ecclesiastical dignitaries (the bishops of Chartres, Reims or Le Puy); since under the eyes of God and his ministers, in the sacred mystery of communion under both kinds, the healing powers of princes acquired a real form and manifested themselves as true emanations of the divine will, assuming a totally sacred connotation, free from any suspicion of paganism or heresy.

These consecrations nonetheless concealed the fierce struggles between the emerging Gallican Church, which sought above all to recognize the King of France as its true protector, and the Pope of Rome, who wished to prevent any form of autocephaly of the Churches within Christendom and to assert his own exclusive privilege to perform such prodigies and govern Christians according to the will of the Redeemer. Les Rois thaumaturges thus analyzes another aspect of the so-called Investiture controversy, a profound crisis arising from the antagonism between the various institutions over the legitimacy of their power on Earth and the possibility of directing the life of the Christian people (which often translated into the right to choose bishops and other power-holders in the Church alone, something which, thanks to the administration of state property, guaranteed great opportunities for enrichment).

The origin of this alliance between ruler and bishop was the conversion and consecration of the first great Catholic king of the Franks: Clovis I, of the Merovingian dynasty, baptized with holy oil given by the Holy Spirit to Saint Remigius, and proclaimed king by the will of God. It was in this episode that the rulers of France (whose titles included that of "Most Christian King") saw the source of their miraculous powers, an illustration of the constant renewal of the covenant between Christ's Church and the Crown.

In this book, the jurist Jacques Bonaud de Sauzet is considered one of the earliest apologists for the Valois, as he refutes the canonist Felino Maria Sandeo, who refused to recognize the thaumaturgical privilege of the kings of France as miraculous.

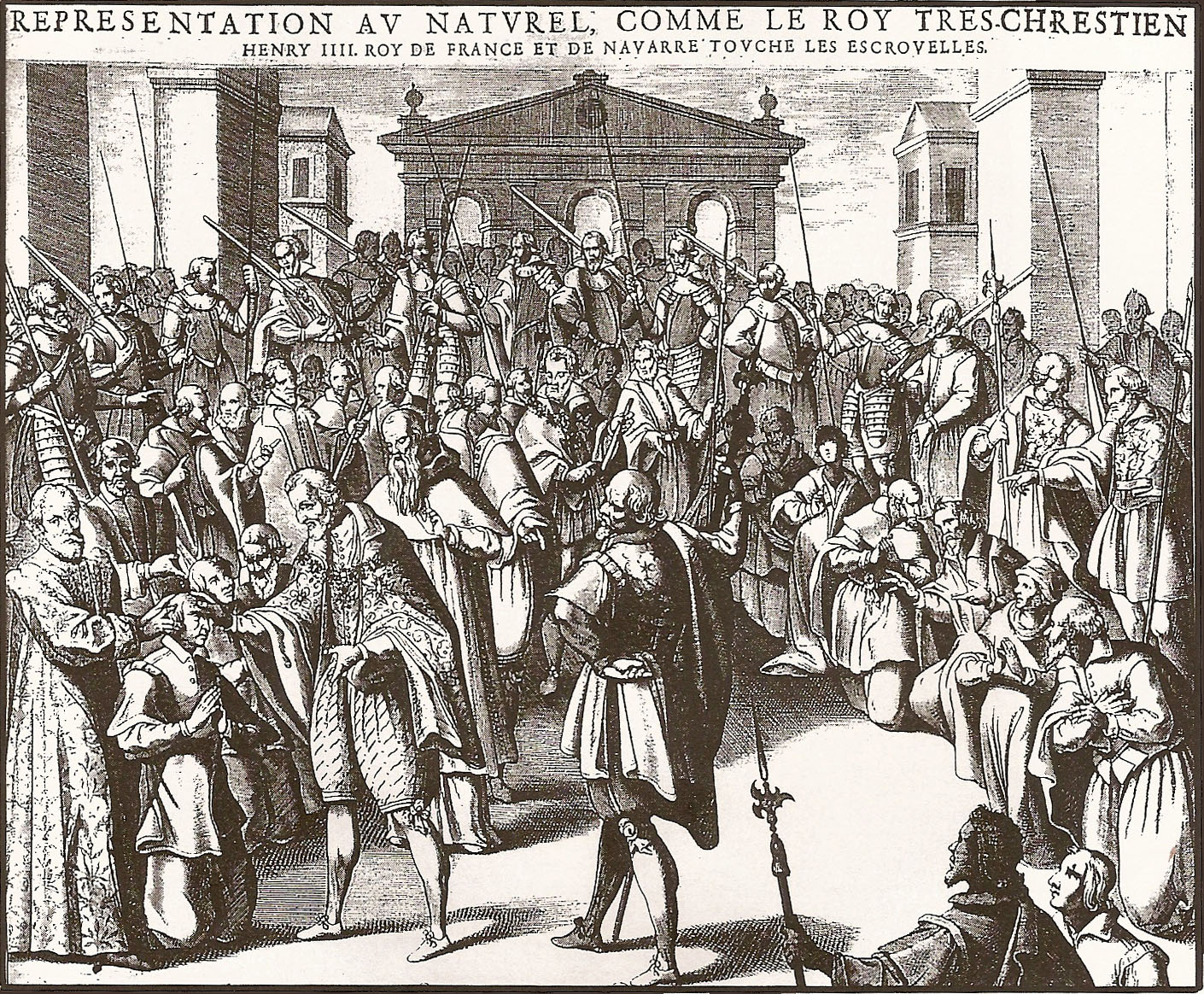
Henri IV touchant les écrouelles

=== Summary ===
In book I Chapter I, the author sets out to establish when the royal power to cure appeared: with Robert II of France (c. 972 – 1031), according Helgaud, and Henry I of England (c. 1068 – 1135). In Chapter II, he looks for the origins of this power in the sacred nature of kings, already found in the old Germanic kingdoms. The sacred nature of the king was affirmed by the practice of anointing: first for Pepin the Short, then for his successors; then for the English kings from the Council of Chelsea (787) onwards; and finally for the whole of Western Europe. This practice took place as part of the ceremony known as the "coronation" or "sacre" in French. Bloch believes that Robert II, called the Pious needed to strengthen his legitimacy, which he was able to do by claiming thaumaturgical virtues and suggests that Henry I then imitated him.

Book II offers a history of the touching of scrofula until the end of the 16th century. First the king touched the affected areas, and later (Robert II) added the sign of the cross. Later English kings added a blessing. In both countries, the poor were then given alms. The number of beneficiaries in England ranged from several hundred to over a thousand, depending on the year. No figures are available for France. They were of several nationalities. Many travelled several hundreds of kilometres to reach the king.

The Gregorian Reforms were "a vigorous effort to destroy the ancient confusion of the temporal with the spiritual". Gregory VII "denies temporal sovereigns even the most pious, the gift of the miracle" (Letter to bishop Hermann de Metz, March 15, 1081). However, France and England were scarcely touched by these ideas, until "the apologists of the French monarchy appealed, for the first time, ... to the royal miracle" – starting with Guillaume de Nogaret and Guillaume de Plaisians, followed by Fra Tolomeo in Italy and William of Ockham in England (Octo questiones V cap vii–ix). Charles V of France presented himself as a miracle worker. This thaumaturgical power became a theme of loyalist propaganda. In other countries, attempts to invoke a thaumaturgical power remained very limited.

Bloch devotes a whole chapter of Thaumaturgic Kings to a description and history of cramp-rings that gave English kings the power to work cures.

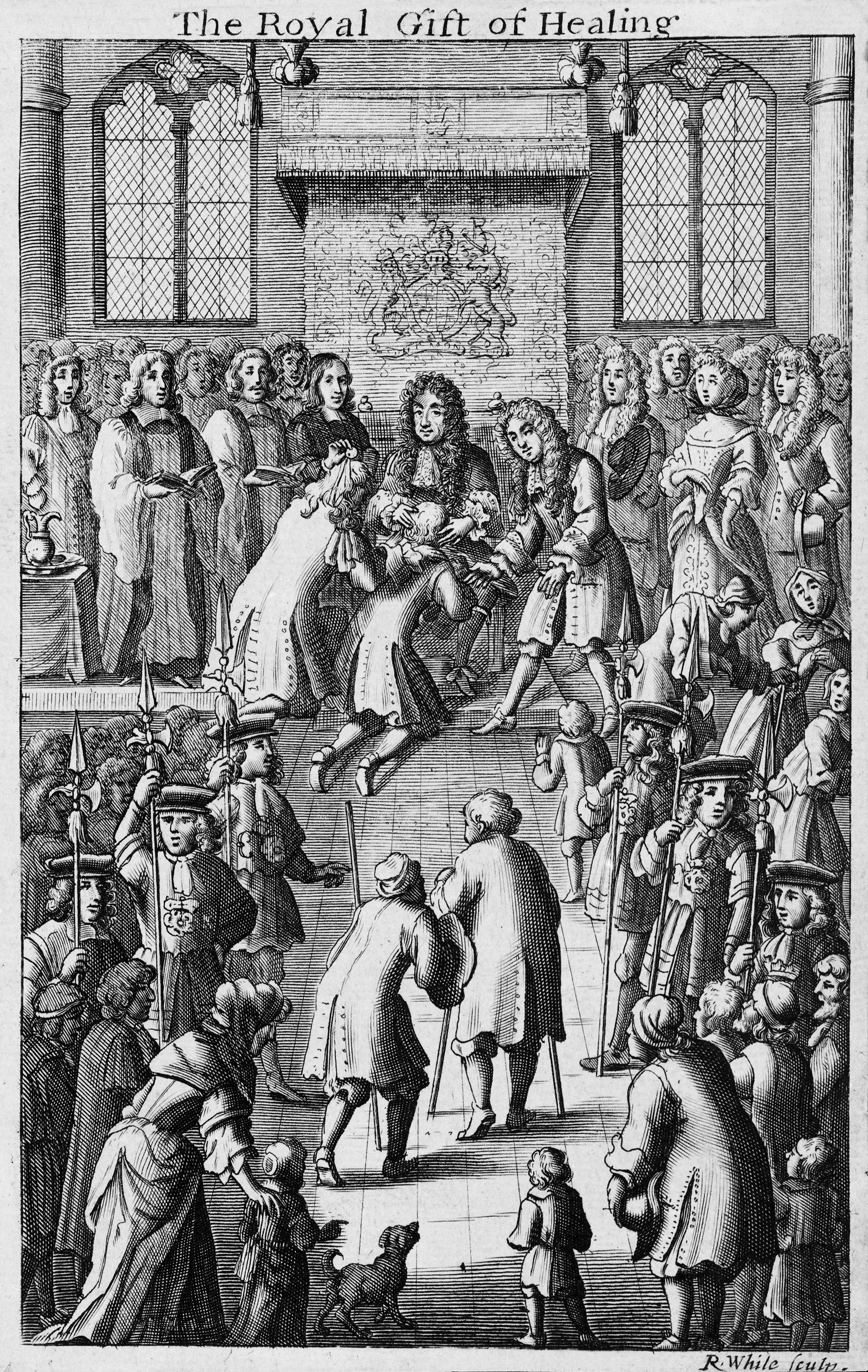
The Royal Gift of Healing (Charles II of England touching for scrofula)'

Chapter III is about the sacerdotal quality of kings and the opposition between kings and the Church: the latter attempted to deny or minimize the significance of the coronation ceremony, while the other camp insisted that anointing made kings more than laymen. During the 13th century, the number of sacraments was reduced to seven, and royal anointing was excluded. Kings, however persisted in their desire to match the heads of the Church, and the monarchical ritual was modelled on the consecration of bishops, including the use of chrism in the anointing during the coronation of French and British monarchs. When the Church saw that it would be impossible to deny that the king was sacred, it imagined giving him the rank of deacon, or sub-deacon.

Another quasi-sacerdotal privilege enjoyed for a long time by English and French kings was that of communion under both kinds. They also retained certain monastic dignities (droit de régale or Jura regalia). All this could be put forward as "proof of their ecclesiastical character and, consequently, their right to dominate the clergy in their states" (214).

Anointing is a concept that can be perceived in two distinct lights: either as a divine seal, or as a bestowed characteristic administered by the hand of a priest. Frederick Barbarossa propagated the belief that during his coronation, the basilica was sealed off from all members of the clergy. This narrative implied that the anointing he received was purely of divine origin: a symbol that kingship transcends mere human convention, deriving its legitimacy solely from either hereditary succession or election (1270s). This notion underscored the idea that one assumes kingship immediately upon the demise of their predecessor, even if the importance of the coronation ceremony remained deeply ingrained in popular perception. Moreover, regarding the perceived power of healing, Golein asserted that it was a privilege reserved exclusively for those of sacred lineage once they had undergone the sacred anointing ritual.

Bloch proceeds to delve into various legends, notably focusing on the narrative surrounding the Holy Ampulla (which belonged to the archbishops of Reims, endowing them with the authority to make sovereigns). Subsequently, he explores the miraculous tale of the fleurs-de-lis and the oriflamme, both also believed to have descended from the heavens, like the power of healing, and all augmenting the aura of prestige surrounding the monarchy.

As for England, Bloch shows how the oil used for anointing ceremonies was purportedly bestowed upon Thomas Becket by the Virgin Mary herself. The adoption of this oil in coronation rituals was inaugurated with the crowning of Henry IV of England.

Bloch finally expands his examination to encompass non-Christian miraculous elements.

In Chapter IV, Bloch examines the links between Saint Marcoul and the belief in the royal miracle in France. After a series disasters, the monks of the priory of Corbeny, which housed the remains of the saint, sent his relics on tour, but it wasn't until the end of the 13th century that the saint began to cure scrofula – by virtue of an approximate pun (Mar/mal: evil; coul/cou : neck), but the saint's popularity as a healer came later (16th–17th centuries) as did the pilgrimages to Corbeny, where he was invoked to cure scrofula.

John II of France was probably the first king to make a pilgrimage to Corbeny. Then, in 1484, the king cured scrofula in Corbeny before leaving again. From Louis XIV onwards, it was the reliquary that was carried from Corbeny to Reims on the occasion of coronations. The king went to meet the scrofula sufferers in the park of the Basilica of Saint-Remi in Reims. The idea was born that it was the saint who granted the king his healing powers. Bloch concludes with a few pages on the belief that seventh-born sons (without interruption of daughters) were healers, like the king.

Belief in the royal miracle reached its peak between 1500 and the period of religious unrest. From the time of Mary Tudor onwards the alms coin (an angel) became a talisman and was as much in demand as cramp rings. Michael Servetus, Lucilio Vanini and others tried to deny the existence of a healing miracle, to no avail. Religious reformers began to speak out against what they saw as idolatrous practices. There was a controversy between Nicholas Ridley and Bishop Stephen Gardiner. Under Elizabeth I, the cramp ring ceremony ceased, but the Queen continued to treat scrofula sufferers. Scepticism grew, and the miraculous power of kings had to be defended : William Tooker, A Treatise on Charisma sive Donum Sanationis (1597). Propaganda in favour of healing power also emerged in France: André du Laurens (Discours des escrouelles divise en deux livres) and an engraving by Pierre Firens, Henri IV of France touching for scrofula.

Chapter V : The sacred and almost priestly character of kings remained a truism in modern times. For Bossuet and others, the king was a mortal deity. Many still believed in the healing miracle, but the best authors avoided mentioning it, as if out of shame. A new and successful story was invented by Étienne Forcadel (De Gallorum Imperio et Philosophia : Treaty of the Empire, 1579) according to which the cure of scrofula dated back to Clovis I.

Scrofula sufferers, of various nationalities, continued to flock to the King, even during the English Civil War. After the king was executed, handkerchiefs soaked in his blood were said to have healing powers. Charles II, in exile, took over. On May 30, 1660, there was a grand healing ceremony. The angel was permanently replaced by a special medal. Charles II cured tens of thousands of scrofula sufferers over a fifteen-year period.

Chapter VI : Among the reasons why this healing practice disappeared, it is worth mentioning the existence of other people with powers, apart from seventh-born sons: the Bailleul or Balliol family, the elders of the House of Aumont, Irish faith healer Valentine Greatrakes, and descendants of a number of saints, in particular Saint Hubertus. Georges Hubert touched Louis XIII and Louis XIV. Added to this were the advances of rationalism, the fact that many philosophers denied kings were "of divine right". Others denied the healing power of English kings: from there, doubt eventually spread to French kings. William of Orange refused to touch. Queen Anne was the last sovereign to practice healing, until April 27, 1714. George I, as a member of the House of Hanover, was not a legitimate heir of the sacred race. Descendants of the exiled Stuarts continued to touch until Henry IX's death in 1807.

In France in 1722, Louis XV treated more than 2000 scrofula sufferers. Louis XVI had 2,400 the day after his coronation. It is not known when he touched for the last time. Many intellectuals had been jeering. On May 31, 1825, Charles X treated a little over a hundred patients, this was the last time in Europe.

Book III : Early explanations did not deny the king's healing power as such, but only its supernatural origin, and replaced it with sometimes preposterous explanations. Some said cures were due to a "nervous jolt" – a kind of psychotherapy. Bloch concludes by saying that it may well be no king ever cured anyone...

This final chapter is followed by 60 pages of appendices: 1. the royal miracle in French and English account books; 2. The iconographic dossier; 3. The beginnings of the royal anointing and coronation (Bloch goes back to the Visigothic kingdom of Spain, to Celtic countries, to the Byzantine Empire, etc.); 4. Analysis and excerpts from Jean Golein's Traité du sacre (Treaty of the Coronation ceremony); 5. The French kings' pilgrimage to Corbeny.

=== Assessment ===
Gérard Noiriel notes while only 1000 copies of the work were initially printed and the book went virtually unnoticed, it is today considered the inaugural masterpiece of the history of mentalities and of the French current of historical anthropology of the medieval West.

From December 12 to 14, 2024, a major symposium will be held in Lyon, the city where Marc Bloch was shot by the Gestapo, to celebrate the work's centenary.

=== Links ===
- Review of the book by Étienne Bloch and Jacques Le Goff on the site of the Association Marc Bloch.
- Marc Bloch bibliography.

=== Bibliography ===
- Freddy Raphaël, « Les Rois Thaumaturges de Marc Bloch et la fondation de l'anthropologie politique et religieuse à Strasbourg », Revue des Sciences Sociales, 2008, No. 40, p. 104-113, read on line, in French.
- Jacques Le Goff, Préface aux « Rois Thaumaturges », p. 1121–1154, dans Héros du Moyen Âge, le Saint et le Roi, Éditions Gallimard (collection Quarto), Paris, 2004 ISBN 978-2-07-076844-8; p. 1344
- Benoît Soubeyran, Un juriste nîmois du XVIe siècle formé à Montpellier, Jacques Bonaud de Sauzet (A 16th century jurist from Nîmes trained in Montpellier), dissertation in medieval history defended in September 2010 at Université Paul-Valéry Montpellier III and reworked in 2015.
