= Marc Bloch bibliography =

Marc Bloch (6 July 1886 – 16 June 1944) was a French historian. He was a founding member of the Annales School of French social history. Bloch specialised in medieval history and published widely on Medieval France over the course of his career. As an academic, he worked at the University of Strasbourg (1920 to 1936), the University of Paris (1936 to 1939), and the University of Montpellier (1941 to 1944).

== Biography ==
Born in Lyon to an Alsatian Jewish family, Marc Bloch was raised in Paris, where his father—the classical historian Gustave Bloch—worked at Sorbonne University. Bloch was educated at various Parisian lycées and the École Normale Supérieure, and from an early age was affected by the antisemitism of the Dreyfus affair. During the First World War, he served in the French Army and fought at the First Battle of the Marne and the Somme. After the war, he was awarded his doctorate in 1918 and became a lecturer at the University of Strasbourg. There, he formed an intellectual partnership with modern historian Lucien Febvre. Together they founded the Annales School and began publishing the journal Annales d'histoire économique et sociale in 1929. Bloch was a modernist in his historiographical approach, and repeatedly emphasised the importance of a multidisciplinary engagement towards history, particularly blending his research with that on geography, sociology and economics, which was his subject when he was offered a post at the University of Paris in 1936.

During the Second World War Bloch volunteered for service, and was a logistician during the Phoney War. Involved in the Battle of Dunkirk, he returned to France and eventually joined the French Resistance, acting predominantly as a courier and translator. In 1944, he was captured in Lyon and executed by firing squad. Several works—including influential studies like The Historian's Craft and Strange Defeat—were published posthumously.

== Work ==
=== Early ===
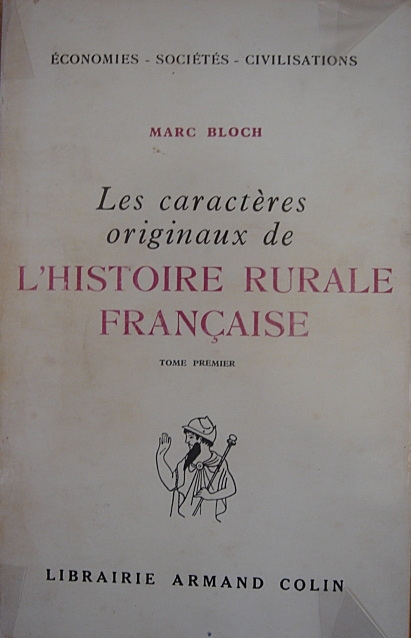
Front page of the first edition of Bloch's Les caractères originaux.

Bloch's first book was L'Ile de France, published in 1913. A small book, Lyon calls it "light, readable and far from trivial", and showing the influence of H. J. Fleure in how Bloch combined discussion on geography, language and archaeology. It was translated into English in 1971. Davies says 1920's Rois et Serfs, (Kings and Serfs), is a "long and rather meandering essay", although it had the potential to be Bloch's definitive monograph upon the single topic that "might have evoked his genius at his fullest", the transition from antiquity to the Middle Ages. Loyn also describes it as a "loose-knit monograph", and a program to move forward rather than a full-length academic text.

Bloch's most important early work—based on his doctoral dissertation—was published in 1924 as Rois et Thaumaturges; it was published in English as The Royal Touch: Monarchy and Miracles in France and England in 1973. Here he examined medieval belief in the royal touch, and the degree to which kings used such a belief for propaganda purposes. It was also the first example of Bloch's inter-disciplinary approach, as he used research from the fields of anthropology, medicine, psychology and iconography. It has been described as Bloch's first masterwork. It has a 500-page descriptive analysis of the medieval view of royalty effectively possessing supernatural powers. Verging on the antiquarian in his microscopic approach, and much influenced by the work of Raymond Crawfurd—who saw it as a "dubious if exotic" aspect of medicine, rather than history—Bloch makes diverse use of evidence from different disciplines and periods, assessing the King's Evil as far forward as the 19th century. The book had originally been inspired by discussions Bloch had with Louis, who acted as a medical consultant while his brother worked on it. Bloch concluded that the royal touch involved a degree of mass delusion among those who witnessed it.

1931 saw the publication of Les caractéres originaux de l'histoire rurale francaise. In this—what Bloch called "mon petit livre"—he used both the traditional techniques of historiographical analysis(for example, scrutinising documents, manuscripts, accounts and rolls) and his newer, multi-faceted approach, with a heavy emphasis on maps as evidence. Bloch did not allow his new methods to detract from the former; he knew, says the historian Daniel Chirot, that the traditional methods of research were "the bread and butter of historical work. One had to do it well to be a minimally accepted historian". The first of "two classic works", says Hughes, and possibly his finest, studies the relationship between physical geographical location and the development of political institutions. Loyn has called Bloch's assessment of medieval French rural law great, but with the addendum that "he is not so good at describing ordinary human beings. He is no Eileen Power, and his peasants do not come to life as hers do". In this study, Chirot says Bloch "entirely abandoned the concept of linear history, and wrote, instead, from the present or near past into the distant past, and back towards the present". (Note: For example, by using 18th- and 19th-century maps to indicate what the agricultural and physical terrain was like hundreds of years earlier, as this would not have changed much in the meantime.) Febvre wrote the introduction to the book for its publication, and described the technique as "reading the past from the present", or what Bloch saw as starting with the known and moving into the unknown.

=== Later writings and posthumous publishing ===
La Société Féodale was published in two volumes (The Growth of Ties of Dependence, and Social Classes and Political Organisation) in 1939, and was translated into English as Feudal Society in 1961. Bloch described the study as something of a sketch, although Stirling has called it his "most enduring work ... still a cornerstone of medieval curricula" in 2007 and representative of Bloch at the peak of his career. In Feudal Society he used research from the broadest range of disciplines to date to examine feudalism in the broadest possible way—most notably including a study of feudal Japan. He also compared areas where feudalism was imposed, rather than organically developed (such as England after the Norman conquest) and where it was never established (such as Scotland and Scandinavia). Bloch defined feudal society as, "from the peasants' point of view", politically fragmentary, where they are ruled by an aristocratic upper-class.

Daniel Chirot has described The Royal Touch, French Rural History and Feudal Society—all of which concentrate on the French Middle Ages—as Bloch's most significant works. Conversely, his last two—The Historian's Craft and Strange Defeat—have been described as unrepresentative of his historical approach in that they discuss contemporary events in which Bloch was personally involved and without access to primary sources. Strange Defeat was uncompleted at the time of his death, and both were published posthumously in 1949. Davies has described The Historian's Craft as "beautifully sensitive and profound"; the book was written in response to his son, Étienne, asking his father, "what is history?". In his introduction, Bloch wrote to Febvre.

Long have we worked together for a wider and more human history. Today our common task is threatened. Not by our fault. We are vanquished, for a moment, by an unjust destiny. But the time will come, I feel sure, when our collaboration can again be made public, and again be free. Meanwhile, it is in these pages filled with your presence that, for my part, our joint work goes on.

— Marc Bloch, The Historian's Craft

Likewise, Strange Defeat, in the words of R. R. Davies, is a "damning and even intolerant analysis" of the long- and short-term reasons France fell in 1940. Bloch affirmed that the book was more than a personal memoir; rather, he intended it as a deposition and a testament. It contains—"uncomfortably and honestly"—Bloch's own self-appraisal:

The generation to which I belong has a bad conscience. It is true that we emerged from the last war desperately tired, and that after four years not only of fighting but of mental laziness, we were only too anxious to get back to our proper employments...That is our excuse. But I have long ceased to believe that it can wash us clean of guilt.

— Marc Bloch, Strange Defeat

Bloch emphasises failures in the French mindset: in the loss of morale of the soldiery and a failed education of the officers, effectively a failure of both character and intelligence on behalf of both. He condemns the "mania" for testing in education which, he felt, treated the testing as being an end in itself, draining generations of Frenchmen and Frenchwomen of originality and initiative or thirst for knowledge, and an "appreciation only of successful cheating and sheer luck". Strange Defeat has been called Bloch's autopsy of the France of the inter-war years.

A collection of essays was published in English in 1961 as Land and Work in Medieval Europe. The long essay was a favoured medium of Bloch's, including, Davies says, "the famous essay on the water mill and the much-challenged one on the problem of gold in medieval Europe". In the former, Bloch saw one of the most important technological advances of the era, in the latter, the effective creation of a European currency. (Note: Specifically, Bloch wanted to know why Genoa and Florence were the first European nations to issue gold coinage. The traditional theory was that they simply had greater treasuries and so required a means of storing it in cash. Bloch, however, showed that Venice was as wealthy as these two states, yet did not issue gold for many more years; the reason, he posited, was because Genoa and Florence, at that time, traded with the east, whose traders commonly paid in gold; Venice, on the other hand, had an important trade with the Levant, but was generally paid in silver, and so failed to accumulate gold.) Although one of his best essays, according to Davies—"Liberté et servitude personnelles au Moyen Age, particulierement en France"—was not published when it could have been; this, he remarked was "an unpardonable omission".

== List of works ==
=== Books ===
Title	Original place and date of publication	English translation and translator	Date and place of English translation	Notes
L'Ile de France	Paris, 1913	Yes; J. E. Anderson	London, 1971	
Les rois thaumaturges: étude sur le caractère surnaturel attribué à la puissance royale particulièrement en France et en Angleterre	1924			
'Memoire collective', Revue de synthese historique 40 (1925): 73–83.				
'Technical Change as a Problem of Collective Psychology', Journal of Normal and Pathological Psychology (1948): 104–15.				Reprinted in Bloch, 1967, 124–35.
Apologie pour l'histoire. Paris, 1949. English trans., The Historian's Craft. Manchester, 1954.				
L'Etrange defaite, Paris, 1946. English trans., Strange Defeat. London, 1949.				
La Societe feodale, 2 vols. Paris, 1939–40. English trans., Feudal Society, 2 vols. London, 1961.				
Land and Work in Medieval Europe. London, 1967				
