= Annales school =

Group of historians

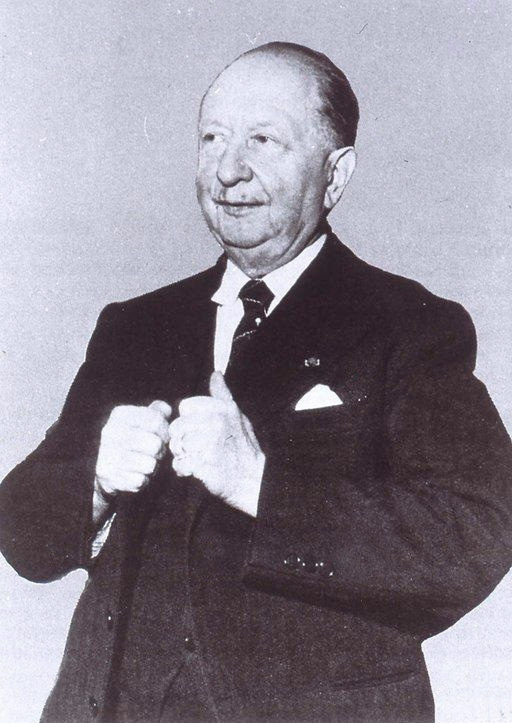
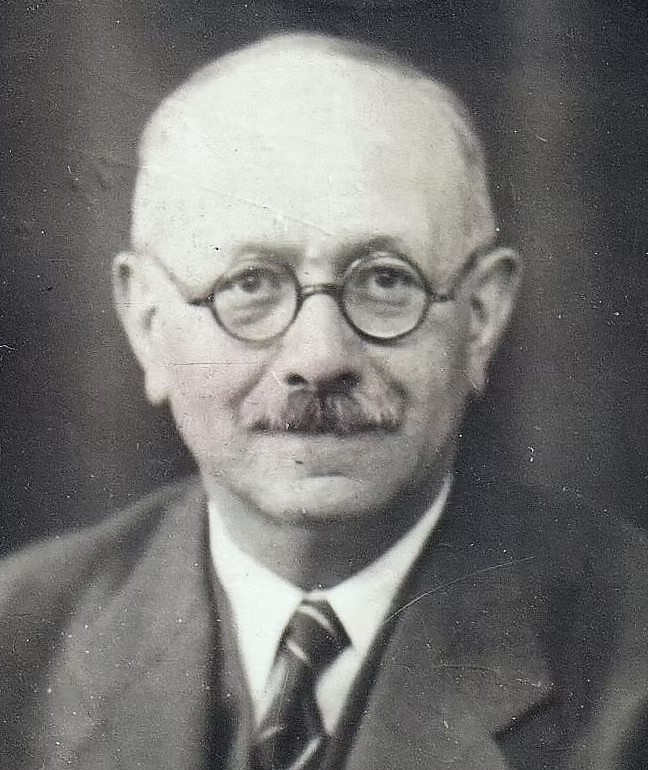
Lucien Febvre (left) and Marc Bloch (right), the founders of the Annales school

The Annales school (French pronunciation: [a'nal]) is a group of historians associated with a style of historiography developed by French historians in the 20th century to stress long-term social history. It is named after its scholarly journal Annales. Histoire, Sciences Sociales, which remains the main source of scholarship, along with many books and monographs. The school has been influential in setting the agenda for historiography in France and numerous other countries, especially regarding the use of social scientific methods by historians, emphasizing social and economic rather than political or diplomatic themes.

The school deals primarily with late medieval and early modern Europe, before the French Revolution, with little interest in later topics. It has dominated French social history and heavily influenced historiography in Europe and Latin America. Prominent leaders include co-founders Lucien Febvre (1878–1956), Henri Hauser (1866–1946) and Marc Bloch (1886–1944). The second generation was led by Fernand Braudel (1902–1985) and included Georges Duby (1919–1996), Pierre Goubert (1915–2012), Robert Mandrou (1921–1984), Pierre Chaunu (1923–2009), Jacques Le Goff (1924–2014), and Ernest Labrousse (1895–1988).

Institutionally it is based on the Annales journal, the SEVPEN publishing house, the Fondation Maison des sciences de l'homme (FMSH), and especially the 6th Section of the École pratique des hautes études, all based in Paris. A third generation was led by Emmanuel Le Roy Ladurie (1929–2023) and includes Jacques Revel, and Philippe Ariès (1914–1984), who joined the group in 1978. The third generation stressed history from the point of view of mentalities, or mentalités. The fourth generation of Annales historians, led by Roger Chartier (born 1945), clearly distanced itself from the mentalités approach, replaced by the cultural and linguistic turn, which emphasizes the social history of cultural practices.

The main scholarly outlet has been the journal Annales d'Histoire Economique et Sociale ("Annals of Economic and Social History"), founded in 1929 by Lucien Febvre and Marc Bloch, which broke radically with traditional historiography by insisting on the importance of taking all levels of society into consideration and emphasized the collective nature of mentalities. Its contributors viewed events as less fundamental than the mental frameworks that shaped decisions and practices. The informal successor as head of the school was Le Roy Ladurie. Multiple responses were attempted by the school. Scholars moved in multiple directions, covering in disconnected fashion the social, economic, and cultural history of different eras and different parts of the globe. By the time of the crisis the school was building a vast publishing and research network reaching across France, Europe, and the rest of the world. Influence spread out from Paris, but few new ideas came in. Much emphasis was given to quantitative data, seen as the key to unlocking all of social history. The Annales ignored the developments in quantitative studies underway in the U.S. and Britain, which reshaped economic, political, and demographic research. An attempt to require an Annales-written textbook for French schools was rejected by the government. By 1980 postmodern sensibilities undercut confidence in overarching metanarratives. As Jacques Revel notes, the success of the Annales school, especially its use of social structures as explanatory forces, contained the seeds of its own downfall, for there is "no longer any implicit consensus on which to base the unity of the social, identified with the real". The Annales school kept its infrastructure, but lost its mentalités.

== The journal ==
The journal began in Strasbourg as Annales d'histoire économique et sociale; it moved to Paris and kept the same name from 1929 to 1939. It was successively renamed Annales d'histoire sociale (1939–1942, 1945), Mélanges d'histoire sociale (1942–1944), Annales. Economies, sociétés, civilisations (1946–1994), and Annales. Histoire, Sciences Sociales (1994– ).

In 1962, Braudel and Gaston Berger used Ford Foundation money and government funds to create a new independent foundation, the Fondation Maison des sciences de l'homme (FMSH), which Braudel directed from 1970 until his death. In 1970, the 6th Section and the Annales relocated to the FMSH building. FMSH set up elaborate international networks to spread the Annales gospel across Europe and the world. In 2013, it began publication of an English language edition, with all the articles translated.

The scope of topics covered by the journal is vast and experimental—there is a search for total history and new approaches. The emphasis is on social history, and very long-term trends, often using quantification and paying special attention to geography and to the intellectual world view of common people, or "mentality" (mentalité). Little attention is paid to political, diplomatic, or military history, or to biographies of famous men. Instead the Annales focused attention on the synthesizing of historical patterns identified from social, economic, and cultural history, statistics, medical reports, family studies, and even psychoanalysis.

== Origins ==
The Annales was founded and edited by Marc Bloch and Lucien Febvre in 1929, while they were teaching at the University of Strasbourg and later in Paris. These authors, the former a medieval historian and the latter an early modernist, quickly became associated with the distinctive Annales approach, which combined geography, history, and the sociological approaches of the Année Sociologique (many members of which were their colleagues at Strasbourg) to produce an approach which rejected the predominant emphasis on politics, diplomacy and war of many 19th and early 20th-century historians as spearheaded by historians whom Febvre called Les Sorbonnistes.

Instead, they pioneered an approach to a study of long-term historical structures (la longue durée) over events and political transformations. Geography, material culture, and what later Annalistes called mentalités, or the psychology of the epoch, are also characteristic areas of study. The goal of the Annales was to undo the work of the Sorbonnistes, to turn French historians away from the narrowly political and diplomatic toward the new vistas in social and economic history.

Co-founder Marc Bloch (1886–1944) was a quintessential modernist who studied at the elite École Normale Supérieure, and in Germany, serving as a professor at the University of Strasbourg until he was called to the Sorbonne in Paris in 1936 as professor of economic history. Bloch's interests were highly interdisciplinary, influenced by the geography of Paul Vidal de la Blache (1845–1918) and the sociology of Émile Durkheim (1858–1917). His own ideas, especially those expressed in his masterworks, French Rural History (Les caractères originaux de l'histoire rurale française, 1931) and Feudal Society, were incorporated by the second-generation Annalistes, led by Fernand Braudel.

== Precepts ==
Georges Duby, a leader of the school, wrote that the history he taught:

relegated the sensational to the sidelines and was reluctant to give a simple accounting of events, but strove on the contrary to pose and solve problems and, neglecting surface disturbances, to observe the long and medium-term evolution of economy, society and civilisation.

The Annalistes, especially Lucien Febvre, advocated a histoire totale, or histoire tout court, a complete study of a historic problem.

== Postwar ==
Bloch was shot by the Gestapo during the German occupation of France in World War II for his active membership of the French Resistance. Febvre carried on the Annales approach in the 1940s and 1950s. It was during this time that he mentored Braudel, who became one of the best-known exponents of this school.

Braudel's work came to define a second era of Annales historiography and was influential throughout the 1960s and 1970s, especially for his work on the Mediterranean region in the era of Philip II of Spain. Braudel developed the idea, often associated with Annalistes, of different modes of historical time: l'histoire quasi immobile (the quasi motionless history) of historical geography, the history of social, political and economic structures (la longue durée), and the history of men and events, in the context of their structures.

While authors such as Emmanuel Le Roy Ladurie, Marc Ferro and Jacques Le Goff continue to carry the Annales banner, today the Annales approach has been less distinctive as more and more historians do work in cultural history, political history and economic history.

== Mentalités ==
Bloch's Les Rois thaumaturges (1924) looked at the long-standing folk belief that the king could cure scrofula by his thaumaturgic touch. The kings of France and England indeed regularly practiced the ritual. Bloch was not concerned with the effectiveness of the royal touch—he acted instead like an anthropologist in asking why people believed it and how it shaped relations between king and commoner.

The book was highly influential in introducing comparative studies (in this case France and England), as well as long durations ("longue durée") studies spanning several centuries, even up to a thousand years, downplaying short-term events. Bloch's revolutionary charting of mentalities, or mentalités, resonated with scholars who were reading Freud and Proust.

In the 1960s, Robert Mandrou and Georges Duby harmonized the concept of mentalité history with Fernand Braudel's structures of historical time and linked mentalities with changing social conditions. A flood of mentalité studies based on these approaches appeared during the 1970s and 1980s. By the 1990s, mentalité history had become interdisciplinary to the point of fragmentation, but still lacked a solid theoretical basis. While not explicitly rejecting mentalité history, younger historians increasingly turned to other approaches.

== Braudel ==
Fernand Braudel became the leader of the second generation after 1945. He obtained funding from the Rockefeller Foundation in New York and founded the 6th Section of the Ecole Pratique des Hautes Etudes, which was devoted to the study of history and the social sciences. It became an independent degree-granting institution in 1975 under the name École des Hautes Études en Sciences Sociales (EHESS). Braudel's followers admired his use of the longue durée approach to stress slow, and often imperceptible effects of space, climate and technology on the actions of human beings in the past.

The Annales historians, after living through two world wars and incredible political upheavals in France, were deeply uncomfortable with the notion that multiple ruptures and discontinuities created history. They preferred to stress inertia and the longue durée. Special attention was paid to geography, climate, and demography as long-term factors. They believed the continuities of the deepest structures were central to history, beside which upheavals in institutions or the superstructure of social life were of little significance, for history lies beyond the reach of conscious actors, especially the will of revolutionaries. They rejected the Marxist idea that history should be used as a tool to foment and foster revolutions. In turn, the Marxists called them conservatives.

Braudel's first book, La Méditerranée et le Monde Méditerranéen à l'Epoque de Philippe II (1949) (The Mediterranean and the Mediterranean World in the Age of Philip II), was his most influential. This vast panoramic view used ideas from other social sciences, employed effectively the technique of the longue durée, and downplayed the importance of specific events and individuals. It stressed geography but not mentalité. It was widely admired, but most historians did not try to replicate it and instead focused on their specialized monographs. The book dramatically raised the worldwide profile of the Annales School.

In 1951, historian Bernard Bailyn published a critique of La Méditerranée et le Monde Méditerranéen à l'Epoque de Philippe II, which he framed as dichotomizing politics and society.

== Regionalism ==
Before Annales, French history supposedly happened in Paris. Febvre broke decisively with this paradigm in 1912, with his sweeping doctoral thesis on Philippe II et la Franche-Comté. The geography and social structure of this region overwhelmed and shaped the king's policies.

The Annales historians did not try to replicate Braudel's vast geographical scope in La Méditerranée. Instead they focused on regions in France over long stretches of time. The most important was the study of The Peasants of Languedoc by Braudel's star pupil and successor Emmanuel Le Roy Ladurie. The regionalist tradition flourished especially in the 1960s and 1970s in the work of Pierre Goubert in 1960 on Beauvais and René Baehrel on Basse-Provence.

Annales historians in the 1970s and 1980s turned to urban regions, including Pierre Deyon (Amiens), Maurice Garden (Lyon), Jean-Pierre Bardet (Rouen), Georges Freche (Toulouse), Gregory Hanlon (Agen and Layrac), and Jean-Claude Perrot (Caen). By the 1970s the shift was underway from the earlier economic history to cultural history and the history of mentalities.

== Impact outside France ==
=== In Europe ===
The Annales school systematically reached out to create an impact on other countries. Its success varied widely. The Annales approach was especially well received in Italy and Poland. Franciszek Bujak (1875–1953) and Jan Rutkowski (1886–1949), the founders of modern economic history in Poland and of the journal Roczniki Dziejów Spolecznych i Gospodarczych (1931– ), were attracted to the innovations of the Annales school. Rutkowski was in contact with Bloch and others, and published in the Annales.

After the Communists took control in the 1940s, Polish scholars were safer working on the Middle Ages and the early modern era rather than contemporary history. After the "Polish October" of 1956 the Sixth Section in Paris welcomed Polish historians and exchanges between the circle of the Annales and Polish scholars continued until the early 1980s. The reciprocal influence between the French school and Polish historiography was particularly evident in studies on the Middle Ages and the early modern era studied by Braudel.

==== In Britain ====
British historians, apart from a few Marxists, were generally hostile. Academic historians decidedly sided with Geoffrey Elton's The Practice of History against Edward Hallett Carr's What Is History? One of the few British historians who were sympathetic towards the work of the Annales school was Hugh Trevor-Roper.

==== In the Netherlands ====
The Wageningen school centered on Bernard Slicher van Bath was viewed internationally as a Dutch counterpart of the Annales school, although Slicher van Bath himself vehemently rejected the idea of a quantitative "school" of historiography.

=== In the United States ===
Among American academics, founding figure in American history of technology Lynn White Jr. dedicated his seminal and controversial book Medieval Technology and Social Change to Annales founder Marc Bloch. Both the American and the Annales historians picked up important family reconstitution techniques from French demographer Louis Henry.

=== In South America ===
==== In Venezuela ====
In South America, the Annales approach became popular. From the 1950s Federico Brito Figueroa was the founder of a new Venezuelan historiography based largely on the ideas of the Annales School. Brito Figueroa carried his conception of the field to all levels of university study, emphasizing a systematic and scientific approach to history and placing it squarely in the social sciences. Spanish historiography was influenced by the "Annales School" starting in 1950 with Jaume Vicens Vives (1910–1960).

==== In Mexico ====
In Mexico, exiled Republican intellectuals extended the Annales approach, particularly from the Center for Historical Studies of El Colegio de México, the leading graduate studies institution of Latin America.

=== World-systems theory ===
The Annales school has been cited as a key influence in the development of World Systems Theory by sociologist Immanuel Wallerstein.

== Current ==
The current leader is Roger Chartier, who is Directeur d'Études at the École des Hautes Études en Sciences Sociales in Paris, Professeur in the Collège de France, and Annenberg Visiting professor of history at the University of Pennsylvania. He frequently lectures and teaches in the United States, Spain, Mexico, Brazil and Argentina. His work in Early Modern European History focuses on the history of education, the history of the book and the history of reading.

Recently, he has been concerned with the relationship between written culture as a whole and literature, particularly theatrical plays, for France, England and Spain. His work in this specific field, based on the criss-crossing between literary criticism, bibliography, and sociocultural history, is connected to broader historiographical and methodological interests, which deal with the relation between history and other disciplines: philosophy, sociology, anthropology.

Chartier's typical undergraduate course focuses upon the making, remaking, dissemination, and reading of texts in early modern Europe and America. Under the heading of "practices", his class considers how readers read and marked up their books, forms of note-taking, and the interrelation between reading and writing from copying and translating to composing new texts.

Under the heading of "materials", his class examines the relations between different kinds of writing surfaces (including stone, wax, parchment, paper, walls, textiles, the body, and the heart), writing implements (including styluses, pens, pencils, needles, and brushes), and material forms (including scrolls, erasable tables, codices, broadsides and printed forms and books).

Under the heading of "places", his class explores where texts were made, read, and listened to, including monasteries, schools and universities, offices of the state, the shops of merchants and booksellers, printing houses, theaters, libraries, studies, and closets. The texts for his course include the Bible, translations of Ovid, Hamlet, Don Quixote, Montaigne's essays, Pepys's diary, Richardson's Pamela, and Franklin's autobiography.

== See also ==
- H-FRANCE, scholarly history discussions in English
- École des hautes études en sciences sociales
- Historiography
- Rural history
- Nouvelle histoire
- Social history
