= Saint-Marcouf =

Saint-Marcouf is the name of several places in Normandy, France:

- Saint Marcouf, Calvados, in the Calvados department
- Saint-Marcouf, Manche, in the Manche department
- Îles Saint-Marcouf, a group of islands off the coast of the Cotentin Peninsula

See also

- Saint Marcouf
