= Saint Louis (biography) =

1996 French royal biography

- Cover art for the 2009 English translation
- Author: Jacques Le Goff
- Translator: Gareth Evan Gollrad
- Language: French
- Subject: Biography, medieval history
- Publisher: Éditions Gallimard (First edition); University of Notre Dame Press (English translation)
- Publication date: 23 January 1996
- English publication date: 15 January 2009
- Media type: Print
- Pages: 952 pp (hardcover)
- ISBN: 978-0268033811

Saint Louis is a 1996 biography of Louis IX of France by historian Jacques Le Goff. The book received positive reviews for its historical detail, and was awarded the 1996 Grand prix Gobert by the French Academy. It was also a best-seller.

== Summary ==
The lengthy book contains three parts. The first section is a traditional narrative of Louis from his birth to his canonization, while the second section is about the views of his contemporaries on him. The third section "locates Louis in both the spiritual and secular world of the day-to-day". Le Goff discusses "contemporary views about the obligations and duty of the king, the nature of government and political power in thirteenth-century France, and contemporary religious practice."

== Reception ==
William Chester Jordan dubbed Saint Louis a "wise and ruminative study [...] his longest and most impressive book". He called the book's final question "a sincere warning against the naïveté that underlies so much of the lingering positivism of the historical profession."

Gary Macy wrote that the three parts of Saint Louis "could easily stand alone as separate books [...] together they comprise perhaps the most complete historiographic study of one historical person every [sic] attempted." He wrote that the historian "sometimes delightfully if not historically, tells us what he feels about Louis, even if he doesn’t have evidence for that feeling. There are many repetitions, again something might expect in a study of such depth. Le Goff also seems to trust Joinville too much." However, Macy lauded the "detail and care of Le Goff’s careful study."

Unlike Macy, Jennifer R. Davis claimed that "Le Goff is far from a credulous reader" of Joinville's account. She claimed that it is not a full biography of Louis as a king, centering more on his personality and the ideology surrounding his rulership than on his actual governance, but Davis called the second part of the book "a tour de force of source analysis". Davis also said that "his optimistic vision of historical biography is certainly worthy of historians' consideration".

James M. Powell wrote that Le Goff "has given us a very personal account of St. Louis and has entered intimately into his life." He said the historian's picture of Emperor Frederick II was too dependent on Kantorowicz’s biography. However, Powell argued that "Louis lives and walks through these pages. What Le Goff has given us is more than a biography; it is a work of literature. [...] There is no chapter that does not contain information and ideas that deserve to be discussed further." Thomas F. Madden of First Things called it "probably the most complete [history of Louis] available. [...] a work of importance, but casual readers may find other histories by William Chester Jordan and Jean Richard more appealing".

Ellen E. Kittell wrote, "Le Goff has gone far beyond the mere biography of a canonized king; his history of St. Louis unfolds as the biography of France." Kittell criticized the translation but still lauded the book as "a standard against which other biographies will be measured." Carol J. Williams claimed that M. Cecilia Gaposchkin, in The Making of Saint Louis (2010), is "generous in her recognition of the fundamental work of Le Goff". Alexander Lee of referred to his biographies of Louis and Francis as landmarks, while still arguing that "his most dramatic contribution to scholarship was perhaps La Naissance du Purgatoire (1981)".

Some reviewers were more moderate in their praise. Davis noted that there is controversy surrounding Le Goff's argument that the real Louis and the ideal models of conduct transmitted about Louis largely coincide. Jordan argued that the models obscure the view of the real Louis, comprising a refashioned ideal image. In the London Review of Books, Alexander Murray praised Saint Louis as a "brilliant" biography. But Murray also stated that Le Goff "paints with a broad brush. [...] Blanche is ‘insufferable and frankly, odious’, Matthew Paris shows his ‘usual perversity’, Louis ‘held intellectuals in contempt’ (actually, he helped found the Sorbonne). This broadness of brush hides nuances which, exposed, would reveal that Louis’s reign has a long-term significance that Le Goff scarcely hints at."

David Bachrach praised the second section of Saint Louis as the strongest, particularly Le Goff's treatment of Jean de Joinville's account. However, he said the historian misses opportunities to come to a closer understanding of Louis as an individual and ruler (e.g. "whether he was [...] innovative or conservative, a master of detail or delegator of authority"). Bachrach wrote that Le Goff "limits himself to stringing together series of events in which Louis played a role."
