= Robert Mandrou =

French historian (1921–1984)

Robert Mandrou (French: [ʁɔbɛʁ mɑ̃dʁu]; 31 January 1921 – 16 June 1984), was a French historian, one of the members of the Annales School and the secretary to its journal Annales d'Histoire Economique et Sociale ("Annals of economic and social history") . He was also, with Georges Duby one of the pioneers of what Annaliste historians in the 1970s and 80's came to call the "history of mentalities".

== Selected works ==
- Histoire de la civilisation française (2 vol. with Georges Duby), Paris, Armand Colin, 1958. (published in English as A History of French Civilization, Random House, 1964)
