= Mycobacterium florentinum =

Scientific classification
- Domain: Bacteria
- Kingdom: Bacillati
- Phylum: Actinomycetota
- Class: Actinomycetes
- Order: Mycobacteriales
- Family: Mycobacteriaceae
- Genus: Mycobacterium
- Species: M. florentinum

Binomial name
- Mycobacterium florentinum Tortoli et al. 2005, DSM 44852

Species of bacterium

Mycobacterium florentinum is a strain of bacteria found in humans that can cause infections and other disease conditions, and prolong sickness. It presents a high resistance to antimycobacterial drugs. It is characterized by: slow growth and a short helix 18 in the 16S rDNA.

Etymology: florentinum, of the Italian city of Florence, where the majority of the strains were collected and investigated.

== Type strain ==
First isolated and characterized in Florence, Italy. Strain FI-93171 = CCUG 50992 = CIP 108409 = DSM 44852

== See also ==
- Mycobacterial cervical lymphadenitis
