= Royal touch =

Healing power supposedly possessed by monarchs

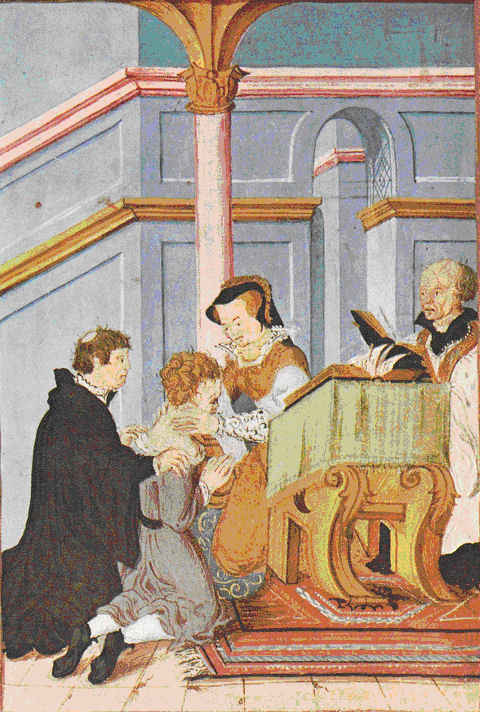
Mary I of England touching for scrofula, 16th-century illustration by Levina Teerlinc

The royal touch (also known as the king's touch) was a form of laying on of hands, whereby French and English monarchs touched their subjects, regardless of social classes, with the intent to cure them of various diseases and conditions. The thaumaturgic touch was most commonly applied to people suffering from tuberculous cervical lymphadenitis (better known as scrofula or the king's evil), and exclusively to them from the 16th century onwards. The disease rarely resulted in death and often went into remission on its own, giving the impression that the monarch's touch cured it. The claimed power was most notably exercised by monarchs who sought to demonstrate the legitimacy of their reign and of their newly founded dynasties.

== Origins ==
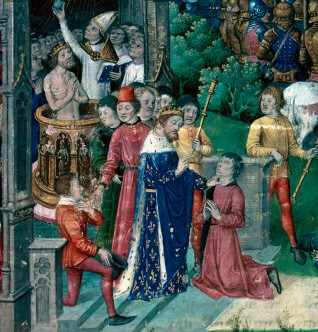
A 15th-century manuscript depicting the tradition that Clovis I healed the scrofulous following his coronation.

The kings and queens regnant of England and the kings of France were the only Christian rulers who claimed the divine gift (divinitus) to cure by touching or stroking the diseased. This special aptitude was thought to be evidence of God's high esteem of the two monarchies, though they never agreed upon whose predecessors the ability was first conferred. In England, Saint Edward the Confessor (r. 1042–1066) was said to be the first monarch to possess the healing power of the royal touch. The French, who normally traced the origins of their monarchs' divine gift back to Philip I (r. 1059–1108) or even Robert II (r. 987–1031), denied that Saint Edward used the royal touch. They insisted that the first English monarch to claim the ability was Henry I (r. 1100–1135), and that his touching was a politically influenced imitation of the gift granted exclusively to French monarchs.

The physician André du Laurens (1558–1609) claimed that Clovis I (r. 481–511) was the first king who touched for scrofula, but the medievalist Marc Bloch (1886–1944) argued that it was probably Philip I. Modern scholars, most notably Frank Barlow (1911–2009), agree that the French practice most likely originated from Saint Louis IX (r. 1226–1270). The earliest direct evidence of the royal touch in England are the financial records dating from the reign of Edward I (r. 1272–1307). The crusading Edward I did not arrive in England until 1274 but the custom of giving one penny to each patient had become well established by 1276, suggesting that the practice dated at least from the reign of his father, Henry III (r. 1216–1272). Henry III, known for insisting on his arbitrary decisions, loved public displays and was as pious as his beloved brother-in-law, Saint Louis IX, all of which makes it likely that he introduced the practice in England.

== England ==
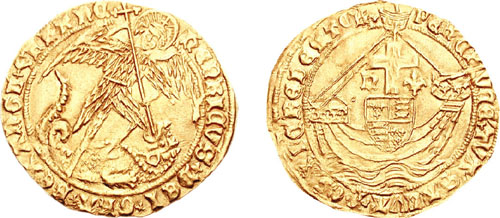
Touch piece of Henry VI (r. 1422–1461)

Henry I's successors did not consider the royal touch fundamental, reducing its application. The ritual remained a marginal aspect of kingship until the 17th century, when its appeal grew to unprecedented proportions and when it suddenly became an object of scrutiny in literature.

Since the reign of Edward IV (r. 1461–1470, 1471–1483), monarchs presented the diseased with a gold coin known as an Angel and hung it around the subject's neck. The reverse of the coin depicted a ship, while the obverse showed the archangel Michael slaying a dragon, which led to the coin being popularly referred to as an Angel. Angels were currency, valued at 6s–8d when introduced, but when used as a Touch piece they were pierced for hanging round the neck. The diseased were instructed to wear the coin constantly to ensure the success of the treatment. Not all people embraced the notion of the royal touch and miraculous cures; many were simply eager to obtain the valuable gold coin. When the Angel went out of production in 1634, a small gold medal was struck for royal touching.

=== Procedure ===
Henry VII (r. 1485–1509), the first Tudor on the English throne, was preoccupied with legitimizing his reign. It was he who firmly established and codified the ritual, relying heavily on precedent set by his predecessors. It consisted of four distinct elements:

1. The monarch touched (or stroked) the face or neck of the infected person.
2. The monarch hung the coin around the person's neck.
3. Passages from the Gospel of Mark (16: 14–20) and the Gospel of John (1: 1–14) were read. Mark 16 contains themes that confirm the monarch's immunity to infectious diseases: "They shall take up serpents; and if they drink any deadly thing, it shall not hurt them; they shall lay hands on the sick, and they shall recover." Mark 16:18
4. Prayers were offered. Until the English Reformation, the prayers were addressed not only to God but also to Virgin Mary and the other saints.

"A most miraculous work in this good king;
Which often, since my here-remain in England,
I have seen him do. How he solicits heaven,
Himself best knows: but strangely-visited people,
All swoln and ulcerous, pitiful to the eye
The mere despair of surgery, he cures,
Hanging a golden stamp about their necks,
Put on with holy prayers: and 'tis spoken
To the succeeding royalty he leaves
The healing benediction"
Malcolm describing Edward the Confessor's touch, in William Shakespeare's Macbeth, Act IV, Scene 3

The touch was originally meant to cure tuberculous cervical lymphadenitis (commonly referred to as scrofula or the King's Evil), rheumatism, convulsions, fevers, blindness, goitre and other ailments. Since the reign of Elizabeth I (r. 1558–1603), however, the touch was applied only to people suffering from scrofula. The Henrician practice was rarely modified, with changes to the ceremonial being minor; Elizabeth I traced the Sign of the Cross above the infected person's head, while her squeamish successor, James I (r. 1603–1625), made stroking motions above the abscesses instead of actually touching them.

=== Frequency ===
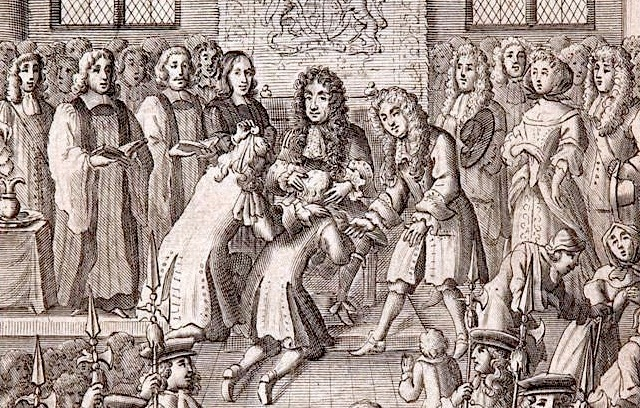
Charles II performing the royal touch; engraving by Robert White (1684)

The ritual was normally performed between Michaelmas and Easter, when cold weather made it less likely to contract a disease from an infected subject. It was believed that the treatment was more likely to be successful if performed on a holy day. English monarchs generally touched less frequently than their French counterparts. Edward I touched up to 1,736 people annually, but did not touch during his frequent military campaigns abroad. His immediate successors followed a similar pattern.

Henry VII touched seven or eight infected people annually, and there were intervals of several years in which he did not perform the ritual at all. Henry VIII (r. 1509–1547) touched 59 people between early January 1530 and late December 1532. The Protestant Edward VI (r. 1547–1553) apparently did not perform the ritual, but the Catholic Mary I (r. 1553–1558) took it somewhat more seriously. Early in her reign, the Protestant Elizabeth I was reluctant to participate in a ritual whose efficacy she probably doubted. Although she resumed the practice in 1570, after the Catholic Church excommunicated her and claimed she had thus lost her healing touch, Elizabeth decisively downplayed her own role in the miraculous healing. The Elizabethan surgeon William Clowes, who asserted that the royal touch proved her legitimacy, claimed that Elizabeth could also heal foreigners, citing a Dutchman as an example.

Although the staunchly Protestant James I wished to end the practice, he found himself having to touch an increasing number of people. The practice spread to Scotland, where James also reigned and resided before the Union of the Crowns; the Scots started believing that their king, now also king of England, possessed the ability to heal them. Charles I (r. 1625–1649) issued many edicts to try and restrain the growing public demand. On 27 December 1633, he touched 100 people at Holyrood Palace.

"To that soft charm, that spell, that magick bough,
That high enchantment I betake me now:
And to that hand, the branch of Heavens faire tree,
I kneele for help; O ! lay that hand on me,
Adored Cesar! and my faith is such,
I shall be heal'd, if that my King but touch.
The evill is not yours: my sorrow sings,
Mine is the evill, but the cure, the Kings. "
Robert Herrick's To the King, to cure the Evill (Hesperides, 1648)

The frequency of the ritual reached its climax during the reign of Charles II (r. 1660–1685), the only English monarch who applied the royal touch more than French kings. Over 92,000 scrofulous people were touched by him – over 4,500 annually. James II (r. 1685–1688) was very skeptical about the ritual but nevertheless indulged in it. He was deposed by William III (r. 1689–1702) and Mary II (r. 1689–1694), who refused to take part in what they considered superstition. When a subject asked him for a touch, William reputedly said: "God grant you better health and better sense." Anne (r. 1702–1714) reintroduced the practice almost as soon as she acceded, touching 30 people on 6 October and 20 on 19 December 1702. She took it very seriously, even fasting the day before as a form of spiritual preparation. The infant Samuel Johnson was among the people Anne touched. On 27 April 1714, three months before her death, she performed the ritual for the last time. George I (r. 1714–1727) permanently abandoned the practice, but the exiled James II's Jacobite heirs claimed the ability until the 1780s.

The physician Sir Richard Blackmore praised William III and George I for abandoning "that superstitious and insignificant ceremony", which he believed was a "Popish" plot. The Glorious Revolution and subsequent abandonment of the idea of the divine right of kings rendered the royal touch unnecessary as a means of proving monarch's legitimacy. Reports of Jacobite claimants curing scrofula by touch were rebuffed by a contributor to the General Evening Post: "The illustrious Royal Family now on the Throne despise such childish Delusions, such little pious Frauds, to prove their Divine Right to the Crown. They act upon noble Principles; they want no chicanery to support their Throne." The ceremony ultimately disappeared from the Book of Common Prayer in 1732.

== France ==
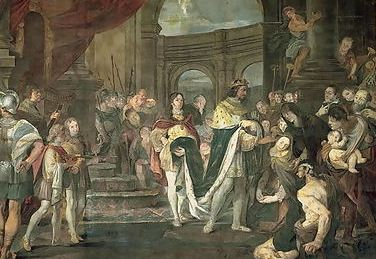
Francis I (r. 1515–1547) touching the scrofulous in the presence of the pope in Bologna in 1515; fresco by Carlo Cignani

By the Late Middle Ages, the royal touch had become an integral part of the coronation of the French monarch at Reims Cathedral. The rite included the anointing of the king's hands, which was believed to confer on him the ability to cure. The coronation and anointing were immediately followed by a journey to Corbeny, the site of the shrine of Saint Marcouf (d. 558), patron saint of scrofulous people. After the pilgrimage was completed, the newly crowned king was deemed to possess the sacred power of touch. On his deathbed, Philip IV (r. 1285–1314) reportedly instructed his son and heir, Louis X (r. 1314–1316), about healing scrofula by touch. Philip VI (r. 1328–1350), the first Valois king, sought to demonstrate that he shared the thaumaturgic powers of his sovereign cousins and ancestors, thus proving himself as their rightful heir. He touched 35 people between 1 January and 30 June 1337; some of them had come from Brittany, Brabant and Vivarais.

The demonologist Pierre de Lancre (1553–1631) boasted that even dead French monarchs could heal; it was, indeed, still believed in the 16th century that the healing power was retained by Saint Louis IX's arm, preserved in Poblet Monastery in Catalonia. In order to be touched by the French king, people traveled from as far off as the present-day Italy and Spain already in the 13th century. The foreigners were ranked in a specific order, with the Spanish taking precedence over all others and the king's own subjects coming last.

=== Wars of Religion ===
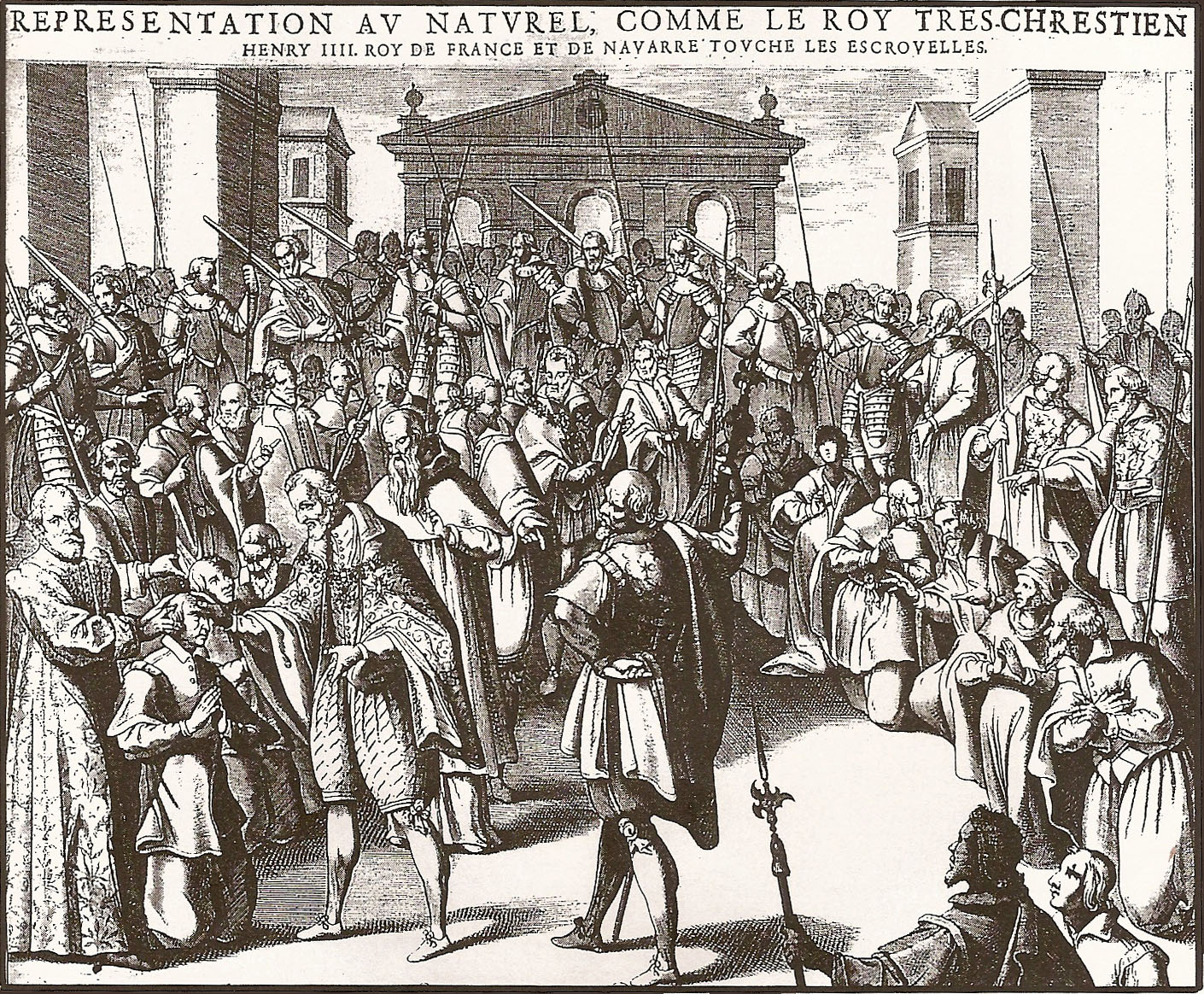
Henry IV touching 575 people in Reims during the Holy Week of 1606; engraving by Pierre Firrens

The idea of the royal touch promoted the power of the monarchy, but the ceremony was seldom performed in the 16th century. During the French Wars of Religion (1562–1598), the worsening conditions helped scrofula spread more than ever and the interest in the disease steadily increased. The Catholic League started a propaganda campaign claiming that Henry III (r. 1574–1589) was unable to heal by touch due to his immorality. After the assassination of Henry III and accession of the Protestant Henry IV (r. 1589–1610), the League warned that God would revoke his gift if the French accepted a Protestant as their sovereign and that the scrofulous would never be cured again.

After converting to Catholicism and establishing his authority, Henry IV was hailed not only as the healer of the scrofulous, but also as the healer of the kingdom. The first Bourbon on the French throne, he decided to take advantage of the ability attributed to his predecessors and use it to confirm the legitimacy of his reign. He was, however, in an inconvenient situation: he was crowned at Chartres Cathedral rather than Reims, and thus made no visit to the shrine of Saint Marcouf. He maintained that the royal touch was something he was handed down by his predecessors and by God's grace, rather than an ability conferred by the rite of coronation. Henry decided not to exhibit his "divine gift" immediately after his coronation at Chartres in February 1594; instead, he decided to save the mystique element of his kingship for his entry in Paris in March. Two weeks after the event, on Easter, Henry exercised his healing power for the first time. He was determined not to show any skepticism about the ritual, fearing that it might cast doubt on the sincerity of his conversion.

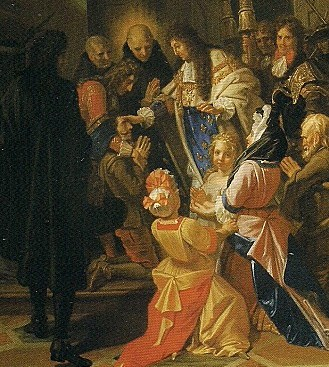
Louis XIV touching the scrofulous in 1690; painting by Jean Jouvenet

Henry IV's decision to indulge in the practice served as visual evidence to his subjects that God approved of his reign. Royal physicians and others who witnessed these ceremonies insisted that at least half of all the diseased people he touched were healed within days. The ceremonies took place in other cities and at least four times a year: on Easter, on Pentecost, on All Saints Day and on Christmas. On Easter 1608, Henry IV touched 1,250 scrofulous persons. He complained that the hours-long ceremony exhausted him, but continued the practice and consistently gave the impression that he was doing it only out of concern for the well-being of his subjects. The ceremony was performed in the presence of the princes of the blood, almoners, bodyguards, and physicians. The latter presented Henry with patients, and he proceeded to make the sign of the cross on his scrofulous subject's cheeks, touched the subject's sores, and exclaimed: "The King touches you, God cures you." (French: "Le Roy te touche et Dieu te guérit.")

=== Decline of practice ===
Louis XIII (r. 1610–1643) and Louis XIV (r. 1643–1715) both actively took part in touching ceremonies. The latter touched 1,600 people on Easter 1680. Voltaire (1694–1778) scornfully wrote that he had lost confidence in the royal touch upon hearing that a mistress of Louis XIV died of scrofula "despite being very well touched by the king". After 1722, the sentence exclaimed by the king upon touching the infected changed to the more hopeful: "The King touches you, may God heal you." (French: "Le roi te touche, Dieu te guérisse.") The new formula, rather than implying that God would inevitably grant the monarch's wish, was a prayer that may or may not result in a cure. Louis XV (r. 1715–1774) was skeptical about the royal touch. He performed it early in his reign, but caused a scandal when he failed to summon the scrofulous at Eastertide in 1739 and never again touched the diseased. The custom was thus suspended for 36 years, until Louis XVI (r. 1774–1792) revived it at his coronation on 11 June 1775 by touching 2,400 people. That was probably the only time he touched the scrofulous. After the Bourbon Restoration, Louis XVIII (r. 1814–1824) is not recorded to have practiced the custom; however, his successor Charles X (r. 1824–1830) touched 121 of his subjects at his coronation on 29 May 1825 in an attempt to assert continuity with the monarchy of the Ancien Régime and its claim of divine right. The royal touch was never again employed in France.

== Navarre ==
The Navarrese monarchs of the House of Évreux inherited a claim to thaumaturgic powers from the Capetians. The actual ceremonial used may have been English, since a copy of the Liber Regalis appeared in Navarre around 1400.

The earliest evidence of the royal touch in Navarre is from 1375, during the reign of Charles II, who had dynastic claims in France. There are eighteen recorded instances of royal touching by Charles II and Charles III between 1375 and 1413, but the record is very incomplete. These ceremonies took place in Pamplona, Olite, Tudela, Saint-Jean-Pied-de-Port and Bayonne. They were not large affairs, only between one and seven persons being touched on each occasion. Those seeking healing might travel long distances, in one case from Zaragoza in Aragon. The touched usually received alms from the king, between 5 and 52 sueldos in the early cases and between 20 and 100 sueldos in the later cases. There are several cases from between 1377 and 1394 of persons receiving alms "to cure them" as if they were touched when they were not.

== Legacy and comparisons ==
The royal touch was not the only "miraculous" healing power attributed to European rulers. The medieval monarchs of Castile were reputed to possess the ability to exorcise demons by making the sign of the cross and calling on God, while their Hungarian counterparts supposedly cured jaundice. Similarly, English monarchs distributed cramp-rings, which were said to be a cure for "diabolical" sicknesses such as cramps and epilepsy.

Inoculation, an early form of immunization, was introduced into England during the reign of George I, who had put a definite end to the royal touch in his kingdom. The royal family strongly supported it, but it was controversial medically as well as politically and theologically. The medical historian Adrian Wilson described it as "the Whig and Hanoverian equivalent of the Stuart practice of touching for scrofula ... But whereas the Royal Touch mobilised divine powers, based on hereditary right, inoculation deployed natural powers harnessed by man, with the monarch as the benevolent onlooker rather than indispensable participant."

Scholars have held different opinions about the royal touch, ranging from deprecation in the 19th and early 20th century to more sympathetic treatment. The Whig politician Lord Macaulay (1800–1859) ridiculed it as an "absurd superstition of a pre-enlightened age". The University of London medicine professor Sir Raymund Crawfurd published a study in 1911, revealing his fascination with the "dubious if exotic" practice. The study Les Rois thaumaturges by the French historian Marc Bloch followed in 1924. Bloch was baffled by the tenacity of the esoteric practice and agreed with Lord Macaulay's assessment that it was grounded in a form of mass hysteria. Recently, however, historians have avoided attributing the popularity of the royal touch to naivety of the masses. The British historian Keith Thomas discussed the royal touch in the context of religion and magic, while his colleague and compatriot J. C. D. Clark attributes the survival of the practice into the 18th century to the persisting notion of the divine right of kings. Catholic author Solange Hertz notably defended the practice, arguing that the French kings genuinely possessed healing powers as the church's "quasi-bishop[s]", provided only they were in a state of grace.

== In fiction ==
In The Return of the King, Aragorn provides additional proof that he is the rightful king of Gondor by demonstrating that he has the "hands of a healer", saving as many as he can after the Battle of the Pelennor Fields.

== See also ==
- Faith healing
- History of tuberculosis
- Therapeutic touch
