= Roger Chartier =

French historian and historiographer

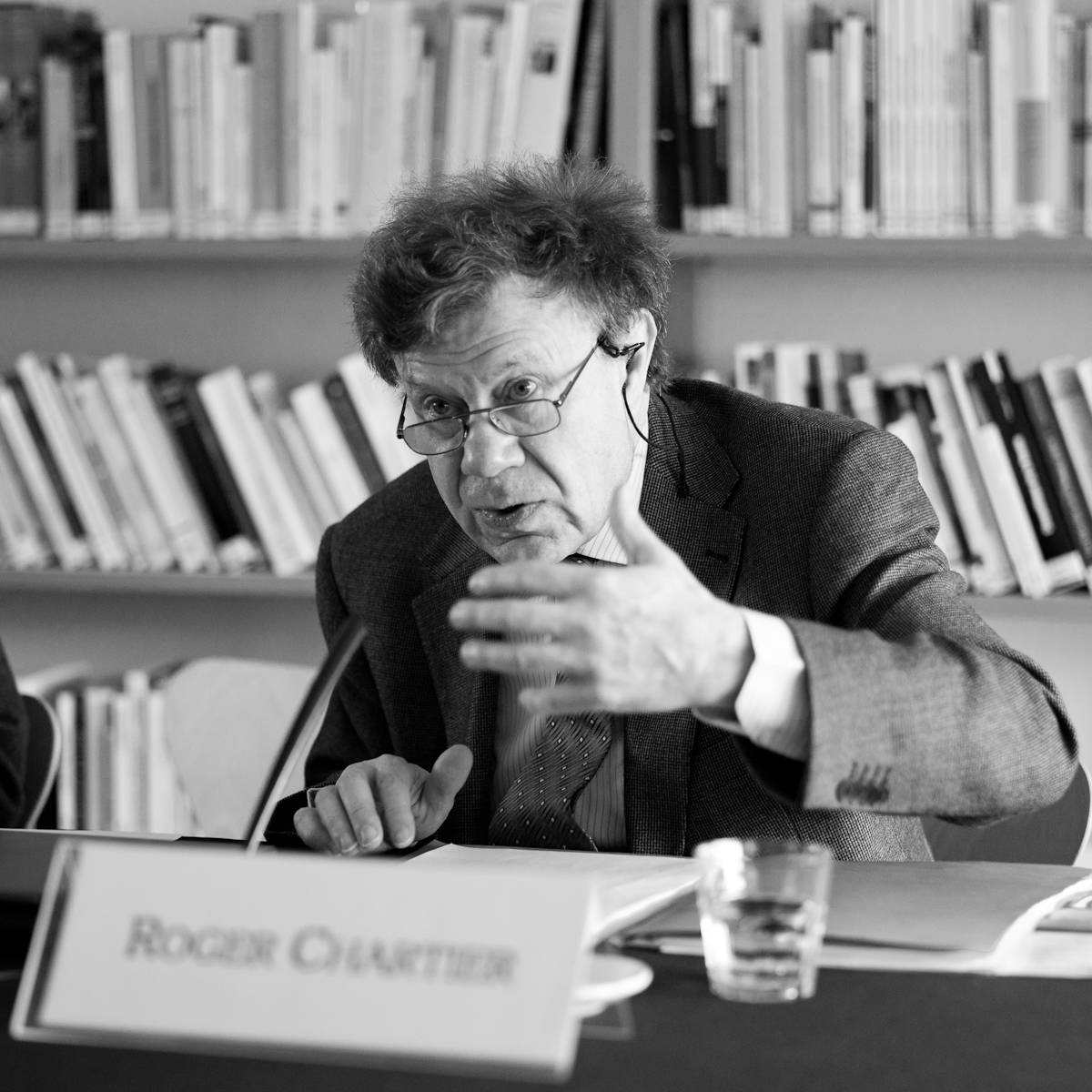
- Chariter in 2011
- Born: 9 December 1945 (age 80); Lyon, France
- Occupations: Historian, professor

Roger Chartier (French: [ʁɔʒe ʃaʁtje]; born 9 December 1945) is a French historian and historiographer who is part of the Annales school. He works on the history of books, publishing and reading. He teaches at the École des Hautes Études en Sciences Sociales in Paris, the Collège de France, and the University of Pennsylvania.

== Biography ==
Originally from Lyon, he studied at the Ampère lycée (high school). Between 1964 and 1969, he was a student at the École normale supérieure de Saint-Cloud and, at the same time, he pursued a 3-year-degree (French licence) followed by a master's degree at the Sorbonne (1966–1967). In 1969, he succeeded at his agrégation in history.

He taught as an associate professor at the Lycée Louis-le-Grand in Paris between 1969 and 1970. In the same year, he became assistant in Modern History at the University of Paris I, then senior lecturer at the Ecole des Hautes Etudes en Sciences Sociales (EHESS). He became a lecturer (from 1978 to 1983) and then director of studies at the EHESS until 2006. In 2006 he was appointed professor at the Collège de France, holder of the "Written Culture in Modern Europe" chair. He also hosts the show Les lundis de l'histoire on France Culture, in which he talks with historians who publish books on modern history (16th–18th centuries).

The works of Roger Chartier are described by Dorothea Kraus as follows: "Authors, texts, books, and readers are four poles linked by Roger Chartier's work on the history of written culture; poles between which he attempts to draw connections through a cultural history of social life. The concept of 'appropriation' makes it possible for this perspective not only to give rise to these research topics, but also put them in touch with reading practices that determine appropriation, and which, in turn, depend on the reading skills of a community of readers, author strategies, and text formats."

In 2009–10, he was the Weidenfeld Visiting Professor of European Comparative Literature in St Anne's College, Oxford.

== Academic awards and honors ==
- Winner of the 1990 Annual Award of the American Printing History Association
- Grand Prix d'histoire (Grand prix Gobert) of the Académie française in 1992.
- A.S.W. Rosenbach Lectures in Bibliography in 1994.

== Publications ==
=== Selected books ===
- Cultural History: Between Practices and Representations (Cornell University Press, 1989)
  - Translator Lydia G. Cochrane
- The Cultural Origins of the French Revolution (Bicentennial Reflections on the French Revolution). Duke University Press Books. 1991.
- The Order of Books: Readers, Authors, and Libraries in Europe Between the 14th and 18th Centuries. Stanford University Press. 1994.
- Forms and Meanings: Texts, Performances, and Audiences from Codex to Computer. University of Pennsylvania Press. 1995.
- On the Edge of the Cliff: History, Language and Practices (Parallax: Re-visions of Culture and Society). The Johns Hopkins University Press. 1996.
- Inscription and Erasure: Literature and Written Culture from the Eleventh to the Eighteenth Century. University of Pennsylvania Press. 2008.

=== Selected edited volumes ===
- History of Private Life, Volume III: Passions of the Renaissance (Belknap Press of Harvard University Press, 1993)
  - Series edited by Phillippe Ariès and Georges Duby; Volume editor Roger Chartier; Translated by Arthur Goldhammer
- Correspondence: Models of Letter-Writing from the Middle Ages to the Nineteenth Century. Princeton University Press. 1997.
  - Composed of three essays by Chartier, Alain Boureau, and Cécile Dauphin
- El Juego de las Reglas: Lecturas (Seccion de Obras de Historia). Fondo de Cultura Económica. 2000.
  - Collected Essays by Chartier, Translated into Spanish by Jose E Burucua
- A History of Reading in the West (Studies in Print Culture and the History of the Book) (University of Massachusetts Press, 2003)
  - Co-Editor Guglielmo Cavallo

=== Selected articles ===
- Chartier, Roger. "Review: Text, Symbols, and Frenchness," Journal of Modern History Vol. 57, No. 4 (Dec., 1985), pp. 682–695 in JSTOR
- Chartier, Roger. "Le monde comme représentation," Annales. Histoire, Sciences Sociales 44e Année, No. 6 (Nov. - Dec., 1989), pp. 1505–1520 in JSTOR
- Chartier, Roger. "Les arts de mourir, 1450-1600," Annales. Histoire, Sciences Sociales 31e Année, No. 1 (Jan. - Feb., 1976), pp. 51–75 in JSTOR
- Chartier, Roger. "Espace social et imaginaire social: les intellectuels frustrés au XVIIe siècle," Annales. Histoire, Sciences Sociales 37e Année, No. 2 (Mar. - April 1982), pp. 389–400 in JSTOR
- Chartier, Roger. "Review: L'ancien régime typographique: réflexions sur quelques travaux récents," Annales. Histoire, Sciences Sociales 36e Année, No. 2 (Mar. - Apr., 1981), pp. 191–209 in JSTOR
