= Nouvelle histoire =

Historiographical movement

The term new history, from the French term nouvelle histoire (French pronunciation: [nuvɛl istwaʁ]), was coined by Jacques Le Goff and Pierre Nora, leaders of the third generation of the Annales school, in the 1970s. The movement can be associated with cultural history, history of representations, and histoire des mentalités. The new history movement's inclusive definition of the proper matter of historical study has also given it the label total history. The movement was contrasted with the traditional ways of writing history which focused on politics and "great men". The new history rejected any insistence on composing historical narrative; an emphasis on administrative documents as basic source materials; concern with individuals' motivations and intentions as explanatory factors for historical events; and the old belief in objectivity.

The approach was rejected by Marxist historians because it downplayed what Marxists believed was the central role of class in shaping history.

== History in schools ==
The teaching of history in French schools was influenced by the nouvelle histoire, as disseminated in the 1960s and 1970s by Cahiers pédagogiques and Enseignement 70 and other journals for teachers. Also influential was the Institut national de recherche et de documentation pédagogique. Joseph Leif, the inspector-general of teacher training, said pupils should learn about historians' approaches as well as facts and dates. Louis François, dean of the history/geography group in the Inspectorate of National Education, advised teachers to provide historic documents and promote "active methods", which would give pupils "the immense happiness of discovery".

Proponents said it was a reaction against the memorization of names and dates that characterized traditional teaching and left bored students. Traditionalists protested loudly that it was a postmodern innovation that threatened to leave the youth ignorant of French patriotism and national identity.

== Germany ==
The nouvelle histoire became controversial after 1945 in German historiography, where it especially influenced medieval studies. However most German historians considered the approach too positivistic for their taste, and not philosophical enough.

== See also ==
- Historiography
- Social history
