= Bacqueville =

- Commune
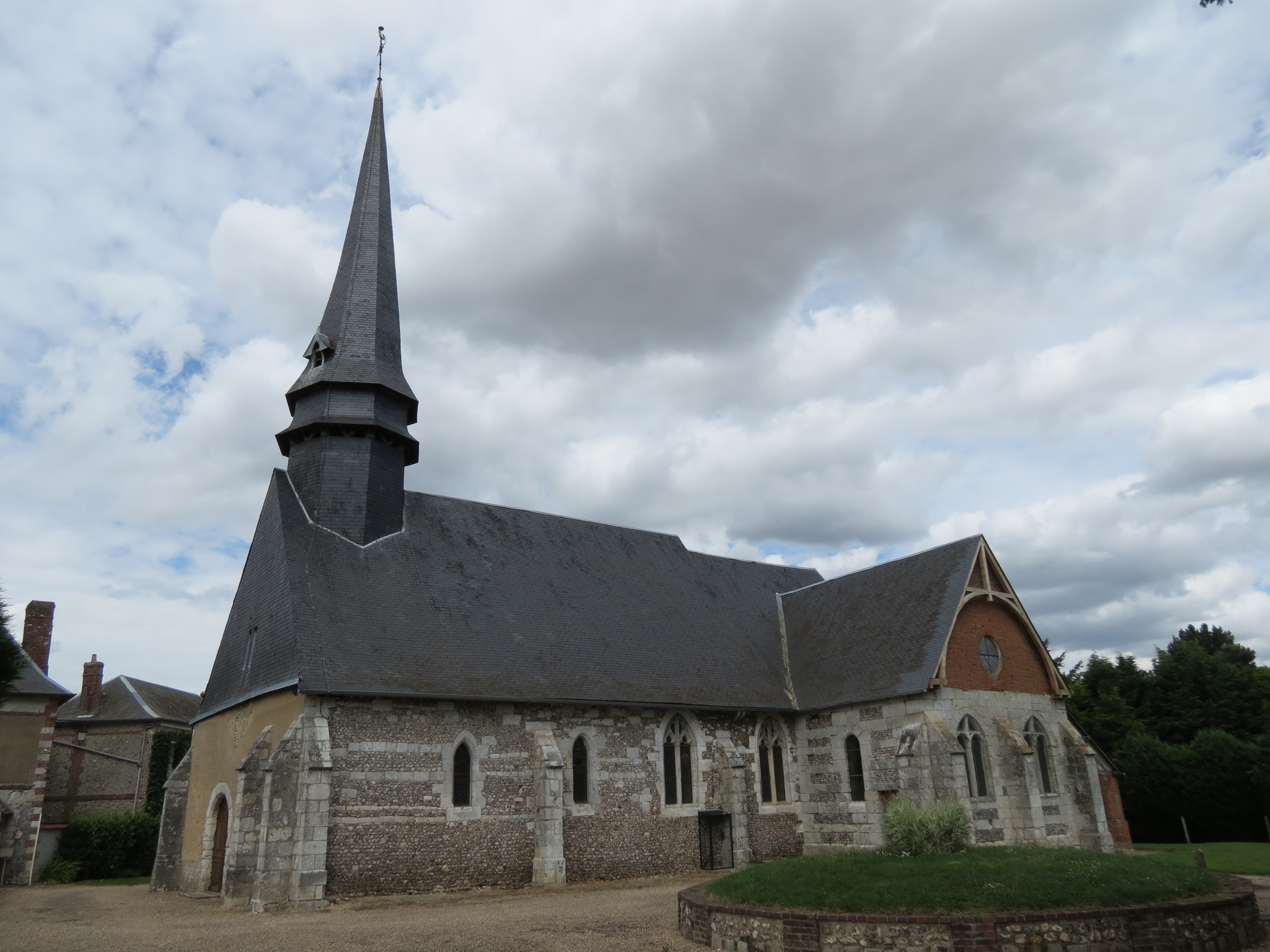
- The church in Bacqueville
- Location of Bacqueville
- Location within France Location within Normandy
- Coordinates: 49°18′51″N 1°22′14″E
- Country: France
- Region: Normandy
- Department: Eure
- Arrondissement: Les Andelys
- Canton: Romilly-sur-Andelle

Government
  - Mayor (2020–2026): Roger Collette
- Area^{1}: 11.01 km^{2} (4.25 sq mi)
- Elevation: 140 m (460 ft)
- Highest elevation: 159 m (522 ft)
- Lowest elevation: 69 m (226 ft)
- Population (2023): 614
  - Density: 55.8/km^{2} (144/sq mi)
- Time zone: UTC+01:00 (CET)
  - Summer (DST): UTC+02:00 (CEST)
- INSEE/Postal code: 27034 /27440
- ^{1} French Land Register data, which excludes lakes, ponds, glaciers > 1 km^{2} (0.386 sq mi or 247 acres) and river estuaries.

Bacqueville (French pronunciation: [bakvil]) is a commune in the Eure department in Normandy in northern France.

Medieval scholar and translator Jean Golein was born in Bacqueville.

== Population ==
Historical population
Year	Pop.	±% p.a.
1968	234	—
1975	248	+0.83%
1982	283	+1.90%
1990	385	+3.92%
1999	404	+0.54%
2007	498	+2.65%
2012	578	+3.02%
2017	628	+1.67%
2023	614	−0.38%
Source: INSEE

== See also ==
- Communes of the Eure department
