= Cramp-ring =

Ancient finger rings worn for alternative medicine

Cramp-rings are rings anciently worn as a cure for cramp and "falling-sickness" or epilepsy. The legend is that the first one was presented to Edward the Confessor by a pilgrim on his return from Jerusalem, its miraculous properties being explained to the king. At his death it passed into the keeping of the abbot of Westminster, by whom it was used medically and was known as St Edwards Ring. From that time the belief grew that the successors of Edward inherited his powers, and that the rings blessed by them worked cures.

Hence arose the custom for the successive sovereigns of England each year on Good Friday formally to bless a number of cramp-rings. A service was held; prayers and psalms were said; and holy water, which had been blessed in the name of the Father, Son and Holy Ghost, was poured over the rings, which were always of gold or silver, and made from the metal that the king offered to the Cross on Good Friday. The ceremony survived until the reign of Edward VI and was briefly revived by Mary I. The belief in the curative powers of similar circlets of sacred metal has lasted to the present day.

Marc Bloch devotes a whole chapter of Thaumaturgic Kings to a description and history of cramp-rings that gave English kings the power to work cures.
