= Saint-Marcouf, Calvados =

Saint-Marcouf
- Commune
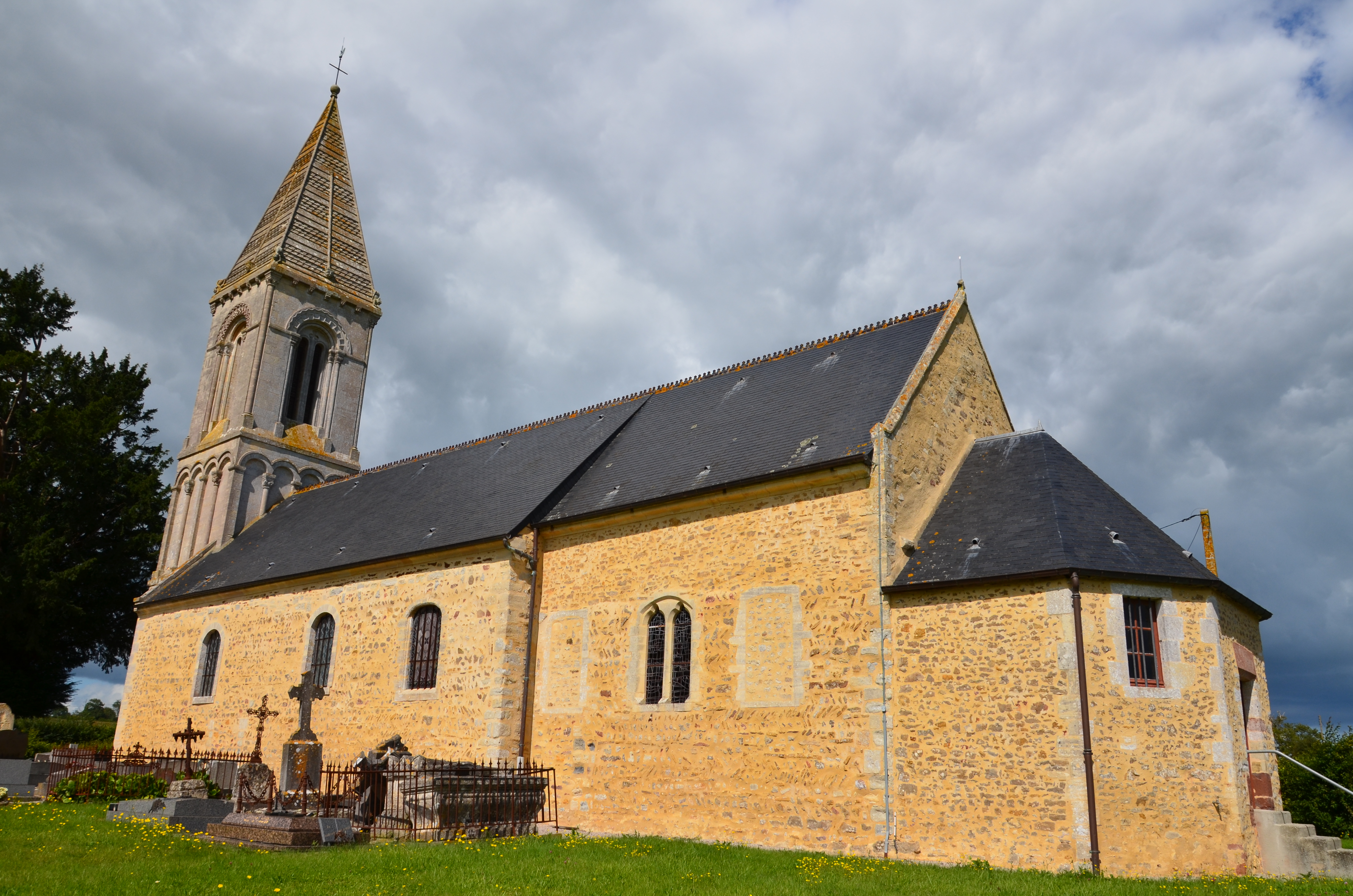
- The church in Saint-Marcouf
- Location of Saint-Marcouf
- Location within France Location within Normandy
- Coordinates: 49°15′10″N 0°59′23″W
- Country: France
- Region: Normandy
- Department: Calvados
- Arrondissement: Bayeux
- Canton: Trévières
- Intercommunality: CC Isigny-Omaha Intercom

Government
  - Mayor (2020–2026): Marc Beausire
- Area^{1}: 5.03 km^{2} (1.94 sq mi)
- Elevation: 62 m (203 ft)
- Highest elevation: 67 m (220 ft)
- Lowest elevation: 18 m (59 ft)
- Population (2023): 84
  - Density: 17/km^{2} (43/sq mi)
- Time zone: UTC+01:00 (CET)
  - Summer (DST): UTC+02:00 (CEST)
- INSEE/Postal code: 14613 /14330
- ^{1} French Land Register data, which excludes lakes, ponds, glaciers > 1 km^{2} (0.386 sq mi or 247 acres) and river estuaries.

Saint-Marcouf (French pronunciation: [sɛ̃ maʁkuf]) is a commune in the Calvados department in the Normandy region in northwestern France.

== History ==
The commune takes its name from Saint Marcouf, evangelizer of the Cotentin Peninsula.

== Population ==
Historical population
| Year | Pop. | ±% p.a. |
|---|---|---|
| 1968 | 128 | — |
| 1975 | 112 | −1.89% |
| 1982 | 99 | −1.75% |
| 1990 | 94 | −0.65% |
| 1999 | 102 | +0.91% |
| 2007 | 91 | −1.42% |
| 2012 | 96 | +1.08% |
| 2017 | 102 | +1.22% |
| 2023 | 84 | −3.18% |
Source: INSEE

== See also ==
- Communes of the Calvados department
