= Scrofuloderma =

- Other names: Tuberculosis cutis colliquativa
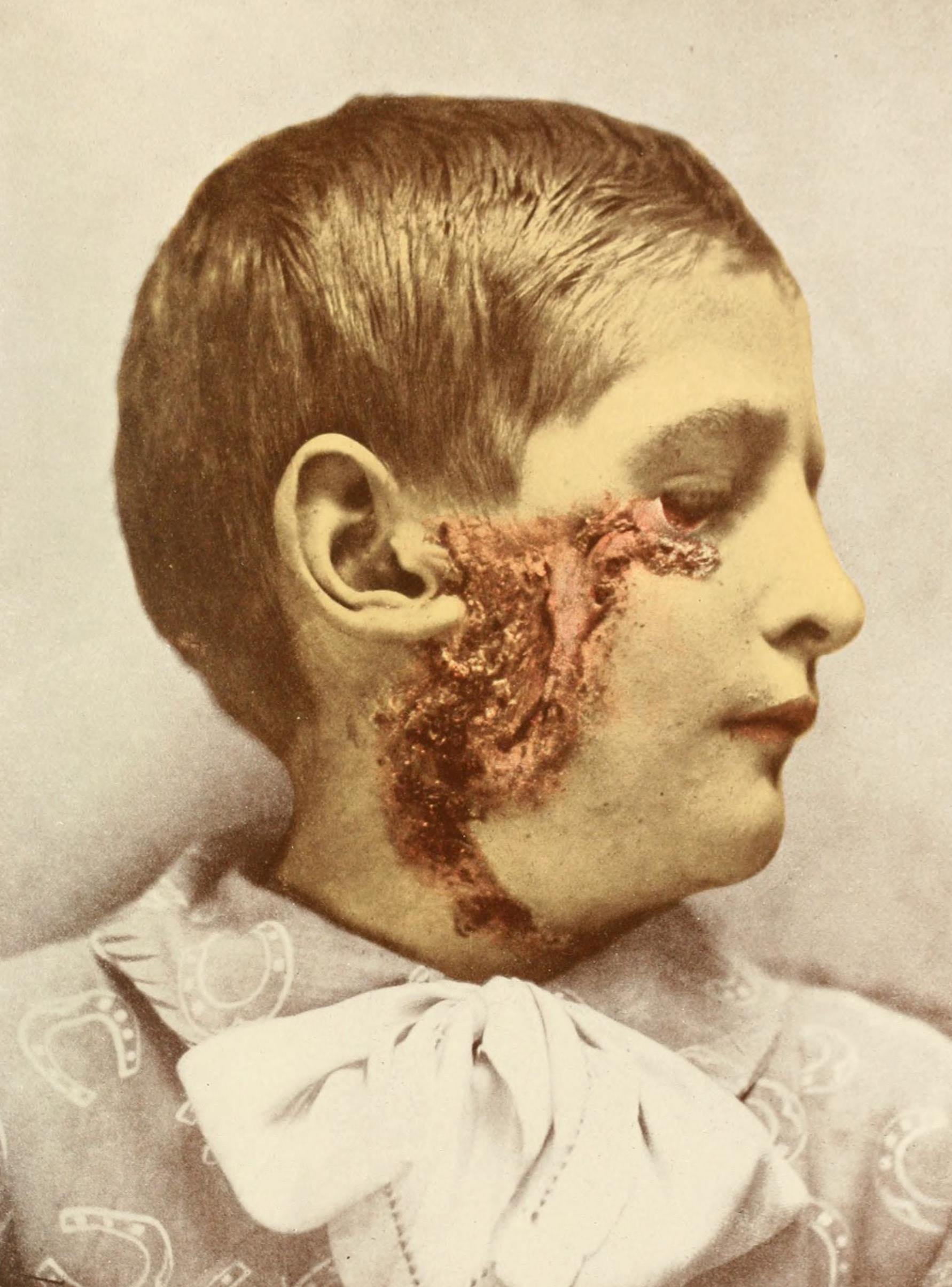
- Specialty: Dermatology, infectious disease

Scrofuloderma is a skin condition caused by tuberculous involvement of the skin by direct extension, usually from underlying tuberculous lymphadenitis.

== See also ==
- Scrofula
- Skin lesion
- List of cutaneous conditions
- Tuberculosis
