= Gregory Hanlon =

Canadian historian

- Born: August 29, 1953; Toronto
- Occupations: Professor, Historian, Writer; Dalhousie University
- Writing career
- Language: English, French, Italian, Spanish (reading)
- Subjects: Early Modern France, Early Modern Italy, Routine Infanticide, Military History, History from Darwin

Gregory Hanlon (born August 29, 1953), is a Canadian behavioural and military historian of early modern Europe.

== Biography ==
Hanlon was educated in France at the Université de Bordeaux, and since 1989 he has taught at Dalhousie University with teaching stints at the University of California Berkeley, Université de Paris IV-Sorbonne and the Université Laval (Québec).

== Academic work ==
Confessions & Community was the first to explore in detail the problem of confessional coexistence during the age of the European wars of religion. According to Hanlon, widespread religious toleration was a pragmatic negotiation among neighbours, completely unaffected by philosophical ideas.

In the Twilight of a Military Tradition, Hanlon revealed the surprising extent of Italian aristocratic participation in European wars, from Flanders and Hungary to Turkey and the Barbary Coast. These elites then demilitarized rapidly under the weight of the economic crisis caused by the Thirty Years' War, and as the small states became militarily irrelevant, nobles moved instead into the service of the Church. In the mid-sixteenth century the Italian states possessed "significant military capabilities, and their aristocracies were imbued with a warrior ethos. But by 1796, when Napoleon Bonaparte burst in, their military potential had withered away."

In Human Nature in Rural Tuscany and in several spinoff articles, Hanlon demonstrated that European populations almost certainly practiced neonatal infanticide on a large scale throughout the early modern period, at the expense of girls, but also boys when the uncertainty of survival and the cost of bringing them up outweighed the benefits for their married parents.

In recent years, Hanlon has studied the place of the Thirty Years' War in Italy. The Hero of Italy examines the illuminating experience of the young Duke of Parma, who embraced the French alliance against Spain only to suffer humiliating defeat. The subsequent book, Italy 1636: Cemetery of Armies is one of the most closely researched and detailed books on the operation of early modern armies, explicitly inspired by neo-darwinian thinking, wherein human beings are evolved animals equipped with a wide variety of innate predispositions. Hanlon’s next book, "European Military Rivalry 1500-1750: Fierce Pageant", published by Routledge in April 2020, consists of an overview of European conflict in roughly chronological order, with chapters on the underlying structures permitting warfare on an ever larger scale, and several chapters describing the details of operational campaigning, siege warfare and the battlefield experience. His most recent book, "Death Control in the West 1500-1800" examines neo-natal infanticide by married parents in Italy, France and England.

== Distinctions ==
1992: Frank S. and Elizabeth D. Brewer Prize of the American Society of Church History
1998: Marraro Prize of the Society for Italian Historical Studies

2006-2016: University Research Professor, Dalhousie University

2018: Induction into the Académie Nationale des Sciences, Belles-Lettres et Arts de Bordeaux

2019: Munro Professor of History, Dalhousie University

2022: Distinguished Research Professor, Dalhousie University

== Books ==
- L’Univers des gens de bien: Culture et comportements des élites urbaines en Agenais-Condomois au XVIIe siècle, Presses Universitaires de Bordeaux, Talence 1989, ISBN 2-86781-076-0
- Confession & Community in seventeenth-century France; Catholic and Protestant coexistence in Aquitaine, ISBN 0-8122-3205-4
- The Twilight of a Military Tradition; Italian aristocrats and European conflicts 1560-1800 ISBN 978-1-85728-704-2
- Early Modern Italy 1550-1800: Three seasons in European History ISBN 0-333-62003-8 PB
- Storia dell’Italia Moderna 1550-1800 ISBN 88-15-08297-2
- Human Nature in Rural Tuscany: an early modern history 2007, ISBN 978-1-4039-7764-9
- Vita rurale in Terra di Siena nel Seicento: natura umana e storia ISBN 978-8876260605
- The Hero of Italy: Odoardo Farnese, Duke of Parma, his Soldiers and his Subjects in the Thirty Years&#39; War, ISBN 978-0-19-968724- 4
- L'eroe d'Italia: Il Duca Odoardo Farnese, i suoi soldati e i suoi sudditi nella Guerra dei Trent'anni, 2017, ISBN 978-88-942764-0-4
- Italy 1636: Cemetery of Armies, ISBN 978-0-19-873824-4
- Italia 1636: Sepolcro degli eserciti, ISBN 88-6102-502-1
- European Military Rivalry 1500–1750: Fierce Pageant ISBN 978-1-138-36898-9 (pbk)
- Death Control in the West 1500-1800:: Sex ratios at baptism in Italy, France and England, 2022. ISBN 978-1-032-26758-6
- Early Modern Italy 1550-1800: a comprehensive bibliography (free to access on the author's Academia.edu webpage

== Links ==
1. Faculty Profile, Dalhousie University Department of History
2. Macmillan Authors, Gregory Hanlon
3. Renaissance Military Bookllist - Out of the WoodWork Productions
