= Jean Golein =

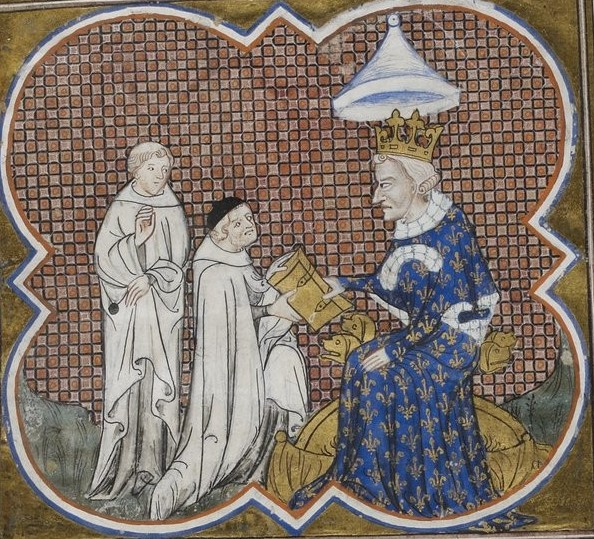
Presentation miniature showing Jean Golein (kneeling) presenting a book to King Charles V of France

Jean Golein (Bacqueville, 1325 – Paris, 1403) was a French clergyman and scholar.

Jean Golein was a Carmelite monk. He studied theology at the University of Paris and graduated in 1361 or 1362. He later became a professor at the university, and occasionally played a part in the political life of the university as a spokesperson to the royal court. He was a supporter of Antipope Clement VII, and became papal nuncio and penitentiary thanks to his loyalty to Clement, before suffering a fall from grace. He was also the confessor of Queen Joanna of Bourbon.

Golein was also active as a scholar; he wrote a comment on the works of Peter Lombard and three other theological works that have been lost, and translated several works from Latin into vernacular French. He was part of a circle of translators employed by King Charles V of France that also included Nicole Oresme and Raoul de Presles. Golein was one of the most productive of these translators. Among the authors he made available in French from Latin were Bernard Gui, Guillaume Durand, John Cassian and Gonzalo de Hinojosa.

== Sources cited ==
- Jackson, Richard A. (1969). "The "Traite du Sacre" of Jean Golein". Proceedings of the American Philosophical Society. 113 (4): 305–324.
- Molinier, Auguste (1904). Les Sources de l'histoire de France - Des origines aux guerres d'Italie (1494). IV. Les Valois, 1328-1461 (in French). Paris: A. Picard et fils.
