= Marculf =

Christian abbot and saint (500–588)

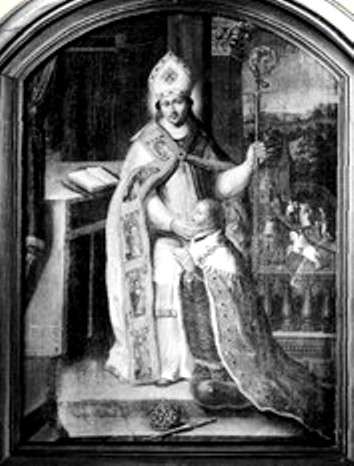
Marcouf giving the cure to the king.

Marculf (in French Marcoult, Marcouf, Marcoul or Marcou) (c. 500 – 1 May 558) was the abbot at Nantus in the Cotentin. He is regarded as a saint and is associated with the healing of scrofula.

== Life ==
Marculf was born in the Saxon colony of Bayeux around AD 500. The accounts of his life are merged with that of Saint Helier, whom he sent to convert the inhabitants of Jersey to Christianity. Marcouf also visited Jersey himself, where miracles are ascribed to him.

He died on May 1, 558, in the Îles Saint-Marcouf off the east coast of the Cotentin Peninsula. His relics were transferred to the abbey of Corbény in Champagne, where they played a part in the coronation ceremonies of kings of France, crowned at Reims, and in the tradition of the royal touch.

The traditional power ascribed to French and English kings to cure scrofula (the king's Evil) by the laying on of hands derives from the efficacy of the relics of Marcouf, according to the chronicle of Joan of Arc, Chronique de la Pucelle.

The north ambulatory of the Cathédrale Notre-Dame de Coutances contains the Chapel of Saint Marcouf, with a stained glass window showing scenes from the saint's life.

== See also ==
There are communes that have the name "Saint-Marcouf" in Normandy, France.
