= Jacques Le Goff =

French historian

- Born: 1 January 1924; Toulon, France
- Died: 1 April 2014 (aged 90); Paris, France
- Education: École normale supérieure
- Occupations: Historian, medievalist
- Writing career
- Genre: Historian

Jacques Le Goff (French: [ʒak lə ɡɔf]; 1 January 1924 – 1 April 2014) was a French historian and prolific author specializing in the Middle Ages, particularly the 12th and 13th centuries.

Le Goff championed the Annales School movement, which emphasizes long-term trends over the topics of politics, diplomacy, and war that dominated 19th-century historical research. From 1972 to 1977, he was the head of the School for Advanced Studies in the Social Sciences (EHESS) in Paris. He was a leading figure of New History, related to cultural history. Le Goff argued that the Middle Ages formed a civilization of its own, distinct from both Classical Antiquity and the modern world.

== Life and writings ==
A prolific medievalist of international renown, Le Goff was sometimes considered the principal heir and continuator of the movement known as Annales School (École des Annales), founded by his intellectual mentor Marc Bloch. Le Goff succeeded Fernand Braudel in 1972 at the head of the École des hautes études en sciences sociales (EHESS) and was succeeded by François Furet in 1977. Along with Pierre Nora, he was one of the leading figures of New History (Nouvelle histoire) in the 1970s.

Subsequently, he dedicated himself to studies on the historical anthropology of Western Europe during medieval times. He was well known for contesting the very name of "Middle Ages" and its chronology, highlighting achievements of this period and variations inside it, in particular by attracting attention to the Renaissance of the 12th century.

In his 1984 book, The Birth of Purgatory, he argued that the conception of purgatory as a physical place, rather than merely as a state, dates to the 12th century, the heyday of medieval otherworld-journey narratives such as the Irish Visio Tnugdali, and of pilgrims' tales about St Patrick's Purgatory, a cavelike entrance to purgatory on a remote island in Ireland. Alexander Lee argued in History Today, "This innovative use of popular culture to uncover the roots of a central idea in the religious thought of the Middle Ages was firmly within the Annales tradition, but extended the boundaries of the Annalistes’ approach in such a way that its broader potential as an historiographical methodology was almost beyond question."

An agnostic, Le Goff presented an equidistant position between the detractors and the apologists of the Middle Ages.

Among his numerous works were two widely accepted biographies, a genre that his school did not usually favour: the life of Louis IX, the only King of France to be canonized, and the life of Saint Francis of Assisi, the Italian mendicant friar.

In October 2000 he received an Honorary Doctor of Philosophy degree from the University of Pavia. He was also nominated Academician of Studium, Accademia di Casale e del Monferrato, Italy.

In 2004, he received the Dr. A.H. Heineken Prize for History from the Royal Netherlands Academy of Arts and Sciences.

== Honours and awards ==
=== Honours ===
- Commander of the Legion of Honour (1997)
- Commander of the Ordre des Arts et des Lettres (1997)

=== Awards ===
- Dan David Prize (2007)
- Heineken Prizes (2004)
- Hegel Prize (1994)
- CNRS Gold Medal (1991)
- Grand Prix national d’Histoire (France, 1987)
- Prix Sainte-Beuve (1981)
- Prix Tevere (Rome, Italy)
- Award of Fondation de France

=== Acknowledgement ===
- Member of the Academia Europaea
- Member of the Polish Academy of Sciences
- Member of the American Academy of Arts and Letters
- Member of the Medieval Academy of America

=== Honorary degrees ===
- Université catholique de Louvain
- Sapienza University of Rome
- University of Pavia
- Università degli Studi di Parma
- University of Warsaw
- University of Bucharest
- Eötvös Loránd University
- Babeș-Bolyai University
- Jagiellonian University
- Charles University
- Hebrew University of Jerusalem

== Selected bibliography ==
=== Works ===
- Time, Work, & Culture in the Middle Ages, translated by Arthur Goldhammer. (University of Chicago Press, 1980)
- Constructing the Past: Essays in Historical Methodology, edited by Jacques Le Goff and Pierre Nora. (Cambridge University Press, 1985)
- Le Goff, Jacques (1992). The medieval imagination. Translated by Arthur Goldhammer. Chicago: University of Chicago Press. ISBN 978-0-226-47085-6. OCLC 28910511.
- Your Money or Your Life: Economy and Religion in the Middle Ages, translated by Patricia Ranum. (New York : Zone Books, 1988)
- Le Goff, Jacques (1988). Medieval civilization, 400-1500 (in Spanish). Translated by Julia Barrow. Oxford, UK New York, NY, USA: B. Blackwell. ISBN 978-0-631-17566-7. OCLC 17413135.
- Le Goff, Jacques (1997). The medieval world. Translated by Lydia G. Cochrane. London: Parkgate Books. ISBN 978-1-85585-385-0. OCLC 39802968.
- Le Goff, Jacques (1984). The birth of Purgatory. Chicago: University of Chicago Press. ISBN 978-0-226-47083-2. OCLC 9196464.
- Goff, Jacques (1992). History and memory. Translated by Steven Rendall and Elizabeth Claman. New York: Columbia University Press. ISBN 978-0-231-07590-9. OCLC 26014680.
- Le Goff, Jacques (1993). Intellectuals in the Middle Ages. Translated by Teresa Lavender Fagan. Cambridge, MA: Blackwell. ISBN 978-0-631-18519-2. OCLC 26722904.
- Saint Louis (Paris: Gallimard, 1996)
- Saint Francis of Assisi, trans. Christine Rhone (London: Routledge, 2003)
- The Birth of Europe, translated by Janet Lloyd. (Oxford: Blackwell, 2005)
- In Search of Sacred Time, translated by Lydia G. Cochrane (Princeton University Press, 2014)
- Must We Divide History into Periods?, translated by M.B. DeBevoise, Columbia University Press, 160 pp., 2015)
