= The Historian's Craft =

1949 book by Marc Bloch

- First US edition
- Author: Marc Bloch
- Original title: Apologie pour l'histoire ou Métier d'historien
- Language: French
- Publication date: 1949

The Historian's Craft (French: Apologie pour l'histoire ou Métier d'historien) is a 1949 book by Marc Bloch and first published in English in 1953 (New York: Knopf). It was the first of his works to be translated into English. At that stage he was not as well known in the English-speaking world as he was to be in the 1960s where his works on feudal society and rural history were published. The book was written in 1941 and 1942. Bloch joined the French Resistance prior to its completion.

== Content ==
The work explores the craft of the historian from a number of different angles and discusses what constitutes history and how it should be configured and created in literary form by the historian. This is first introduced by giving some examples of recent advances in the sciences at the time, and then relating the methods of the scientist to that of the historian, for which he later elaborates on history as the "science of man" which requires the context of both the past and the present. After this digression, the historian is compared to a physicist who is unable to see the results of his own experiments, but only through the perspectives of many other scientists. The scope of the work is broad across space and time: in the third chapter, for instance, he cites a number of examples of erroneous history-writing and forgeries, citing sources as wide-ranging as the Commentaries of Julius Caesar and the Protocols of the Elders of Zion. His approach is one that is configured not for those who are necessarily professional historians themselves (members of what he referred to as "the guild") but instead for all interested readers and non-specialists.

Bloch also expressed the viewpoint that the craft of the historian should not be a judgmental one – that the historian should attempt to explain and describe rather than evaluate in normative terms. At one stage in the work, Bloch observes that "the mania for making judgments" is a "satanic enemy of true history"; inspired by this, he then remarks that all historical events are to be interpreted and understood within their own immediate context, potentially as a reaction against the trend amongst historians at the time (early 20th century) of interpreting documents/artifacts in terms of (what was) modern-day lenses.

== Reaction ==
The Historian's Craft has been described as unrepresentative of Bloch's historical approach, in that it discusses contemporary events in which Bloch was personally involved and without access to primary sources. Along with the unfinished Strange Defeat, it was published posthumously in 1949. The historian Rees Davies has described The Historian's Craft as "beautifully sensitive and profound"; the book was written in response to his son, Étienne, asking, "Tell me, Daddy. What is the use of history?". Addressing fellow historian and close friend Lucien Febvre "by way of a dedication", Bloch wrote:

Long have we worked together for a wider and more human history. Today our common task is threatened. Not by our fault. We are vanquished, for a moment, by an unjust destiny. But the time will come, I feel sure, when our collaboration can again be made public, and again be free. Meanwhile, it is in these pages filled with your presence that, for my part, our joint work goes on.

— Marc Bloch, The Historian's Craft, Dedication
