= The Making of Saint Louis =

2010 book by M. Cecilia Gaposchkin

The Making of Saint Louis Kingship, Sanctity, and Crusade in the Later Middle Ages
- Author: M. Cecilia Gaposchkin
- Subject: Medieval history
- Publisher: Cornell University Press
- Publication date: 15 June 2010
- Media type: Print
- Pages: 352 pp (hardcover)
- ISBN: 978-0801476259

The Making of Saint Louis: Kingship, Sanctity, and Crusade in the Later Middle Ages is a 2010 book by historian M. Cecilia Gaposchkin. Gaposchkin draws on hagiographical, visual, and narrative material, as well as little-used liturgical sources and sermons, to discuss the process by which Louis was canonized and made a saint in the eyes of a large public. The book was praised by other scholars.

== Summary ==
The book is divided into two parts and eight chapters. The first part, containing three chapters, centers on the "hagiographical, dynastic, and political factors that led to Louis' canonization". Specifically, Gaposchkin discusses about Louis' life and death within prevailing notions of sanctity; the canonization process (including the roles of the French crown and papacy); and the process by which Louis was canonized and made a saint.

The second part, containing five chapters, follows "what happened after this when the official institutional centres of the monarchy and the papacy lost control of the representation of the Capetian saint-king." In chapter seven Gaposchkin analyzes the Joinville account, and the eighth chapter is about the iconographic programs in private prayer books commissioned and owned by descendants of Louis.

== Reception ==
In The Catholic Historical Review, Paula Mae Carns praised The Making of Saint Louis as "beautifully written, well researched, comprehensive, and insightful", calling the primer on the structure of the liturgical office a useful addition for readers unfamiliar with the genre. She said the eighth chapter should have included discussion of pictorial cycles besides the iconographic programs in private prayer books, but described this as a slight flaw in a book that is "an invaluable resource for its content, illustrations, and bibliography."

Jennifer R. Davis wrote that "[Louis'] reign presents difficulties of interpretation for modern historians, partly because it was -hard for his contemporaries to comprehend [...]. Gaposchkin's disentangling of the elements of Louis' sanctity, and what these component parts meant to different interest groups, allows her to historicize the hagiography". Davis praised Gaposchkin for providing "ample citations and appendixes presenting her sources", and for drawing on little-used liturgical sources and sermons instead of just hagiographical, visual, and narrative material.

Carol J. Williams said that Gaposchkin achieves the aim of "[tracing] the process by which Louis was turned from a king into a saint". Williams criticized how Gaposchkin's examination of liturgy "remains limited to the text and [...] the melodic element of this chant material has been ignored completely", writing that whether the chant types for saints or kings were used for Louis' historia would have been valuable information. Still, Williams praised the book as important scholarship for "demonstrating how to use liturgical sources to construct a political or historical narrative".

Edward Holt called the book an "engaging [...] remarkably accessible" work, praising the way that each chapter is "summarized in a conclusion that also functions seamlessly to transition to the next topic." Holt argued that on multiple occasions Gaposchkin weaves in extra material without losing the overall focus, and also stated that she "encompasses and crystallizes many intellectual theories of middle ages [sic]".

John W. Baldwin declared in Speculum that "through her mastery of previous scholarship and her singular attention to the liturgy and sermons, Cecilia Gaposchkin has produced the definitive study of Louis's sainthood for our generation." Baldwin stated that she "demonstrates how these ceremonies [...] made Louis a credible and ideologically potent saint for a large public including not only the clergy but the pious laity as well."
