= Corbeny =

Corbény
- Commune
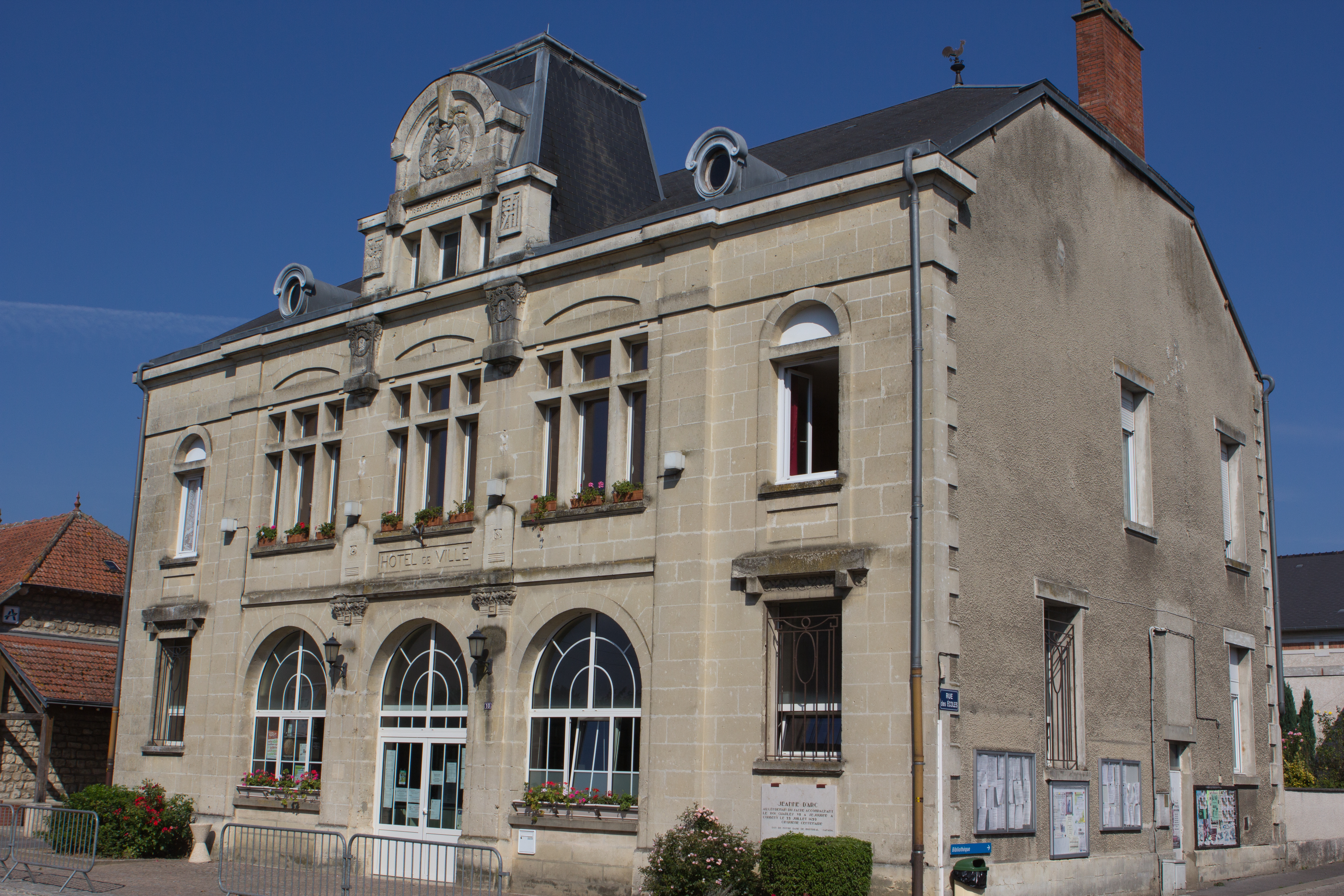
- The town hall of Corbeny

- Coat of arms
- Location of Corbény
- Location within France Location within Hauts-de-France
- Coordinates: 49°27′46″N 3°49′28″E
- Country: France
- Region: Hauts-de-France
- Department: Aisne
- Arrondissement: Laon
- Canton: Villeneuve-sur-Aisne
- Intercommunality: Chemin des Dames

Government
  - Mayor (2026–32): Dany Vandois
- Area^{1}: 15.23 km^{2} (5.88 sq mi)
- Elevation: 80 m (260 ft)
- Highest elevation: 134 m (440 ft)
- Lowest elevation: 64 m (210 ft)
- Population (2023): 851
  - Density: 55.9/km^{2} (145/sq mi)
- Time zone: UTC+01:00 (CET)
  - Summer (DST): UTC+02:00 (CEST)
- INSEE/Postal code: 02215 /02820
- Website: www.corbeny.fr
- ^{1} French Land Register data, which excludes lakes, ponds, glaciers > 1 km^{2} (0.386 sq mi or 247 acres) and river estuaries.

Corbeny (French pronunciation: [kɔʁbəni]; in the Middle Ages: Corbunei) is a commune in the Aisne department in Hauts-de-France in northern France.

== Geography ==
The river Ailette flows south through the northwestern part of the commune.

== Population ==
Historical population
Year	Pop.	±% p.a.
1968	517	—
1975	495	−0.62%
1982	578	+2.24%
1990	591	+0.28%
1999	633	+0.77%
2007	701	+1.28%
2012	748	+1.31%
2017	801	+1.38%
2023	851	+1.01%
Source: INSEE

== See also ==
- Communes of the Aisne department
