= Mycobacterial cervical lymphadenitis =

Abnormal change in size of the neck lymph nodes

- Other names: Scrofula, scrophula, struma, the king's evil
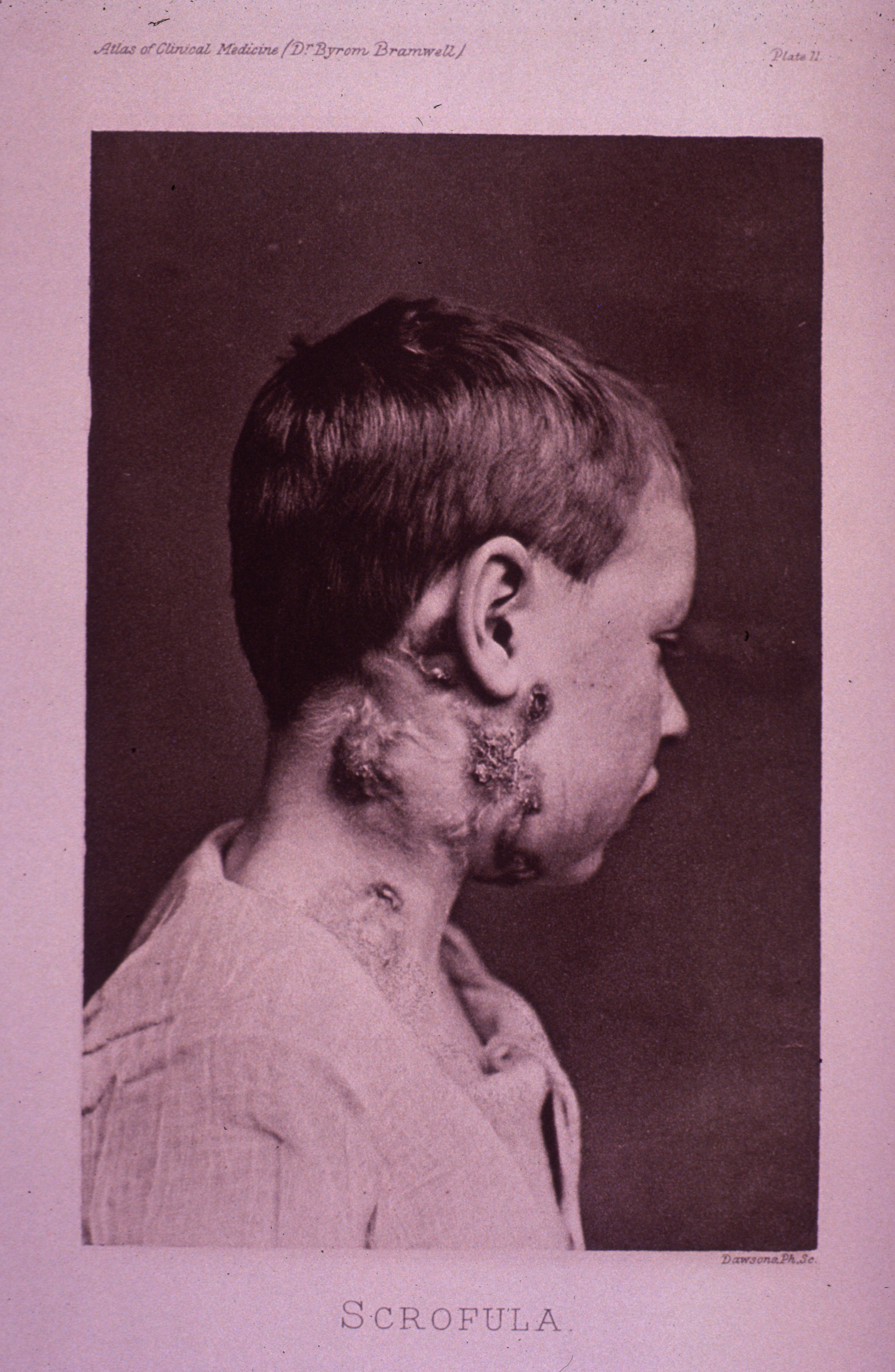
- Scrofula of the neck, showing characteristic bumps on the skin
- Specialty: Infectious disease

The disease mycobacterial cervical lymphadenitis, also known historically as scrofula and the king's evil, involves a lymphadenitis of the cervical (neck) lymph nodes associated with tuberculosis as well as nontuberculous (atypical) mycobacteria such as Mycobacterium marinum.

== Disease ==
Scrofula is the term used for lymphadenopathy of the neck, usually as a result of an infection in the lymph nodes known as lymphadenitis. It can be caused by tuberculous or nontuberculous mycobacteria. About 95% of the scrofula cases in adults are caused by Mycobacterium tuberculosis, most often in immunocompromised patients (about 50% of cervical tuberculous lymphadenopathy). In immunocompetent children, scrofula is often caused by atypical mycobacteria (Mycobacterium scrofulaceum) and other nontuberculous mycobacteria (NTM). Unlike the adult cases, only 8% of cases in children are tuberculous. With the stark decrease of tuberculosis in the second half of the 20th century, scrofula became a less common disease in adults, but remained common in children. With the appearance of HIV/AIDS, however, it has shown a resurgence, and can affect patients at all stages of the disease.

== Signs and symptoms ==
The most usual signs and symptoms are the appearance of a chronic, painless mass in the neck, which is persistent and usually grows with time. The mass is referred to as a "cold abscess", because there is no accompanying local color or warmth and the overlying skin acquires a violaceous (bluish-purple) color. NTM infections do not show other notable constitutional symptoms, but scrofula caused by tuberculosis is usually accompanied by other symptoms of the disease, such as fever, chills, malaise and weight loss in about 43% of the patients. As the lesion progresses, skin becomes adhered to the mass and may rupture, forming a sinus and an open wound. The fatal outcome some patients experienced in earlier times was due to a cheese-like presentation of the lungs and the King's Evil lesions. It was also associated with pulmonary tuberculosis.

Cervical lymphadenitis is commonly caused by an infection of mycobacteria in the head region. This disease is very inconsistent; cases can have different laboratory findings. Sometimes the disease can occur due to tuberculosis disease. However it is vital that, on a case-by-case basis, it is determined whether the cause is tuberculous or nontuberculous mycobacteria, as treatment often differs between the two forms.

== Diagnosis ==
Diagnosis is usually performed by needle aspiration biopsy or excisional biopsy of the mass and the histological demonstration of stainable acid-fast bacteria in the case of infection by M. tuberculosis (Ziehl–Neelsen stain), or the culture of NTM using specific growth and staining techniques.

=== Pathology ===
The classical histologic pattern of scrofula features caseating granulomas with central acellular necrosis (caseous necrosis) surrounded by granulomatous inflammation with multinucleated giant cells. Although tuberculous and non tuberculosis lymphadenitis are morphologically identical, the pattern is somewhat distinct from other causes of bacterial lymphadenitis.

== Treatment ==
=== 17th century ===
King's Evil, as the disease was historically called, was known as a frequent disorder in the 17th century, and was believed to be caused by bad blood coagulating in spongy organs such as the thyroid and the lymph nodes. Physicians also believed the disease could be inherited and could result from parents' untreated venereal infections.

The treatment for mycobacterial cervical lymphadenitis consisted primarily of small incisions to remove the surrounding soft tissue and/or the abnormal mass. Until the 18th century, many doctors thought the only way to cure the disease was to be touched by a member of a royal family. In both France and England, the kings, who were thought to have inherited a miraculous power to cure the illness, touched crowds of infected people. The 'touchings' began in France during the reign of King Philip I (1060–1108) and in England during the reign of King Henry I (1100–1135). This act of public healing by powerful kings and royal family members encouraged the nickname "King's Evil". After the touching, the sovereign presented the affected person with an angel on a gold-plated coin that was to be hung around the infected person by a ribbon. This was used as a way of warding off the disease. This coin could have weighed as much as 5 grams and was considered a touch piece of great value. At age three the English lexicographer Samuel Johnson, for example, was treated for scrofula in this way, touched by Queen Anne and presented with a piece of gold, unfortunately to no effect.

The royal touch and surgical removal were not the only methods of healing employed: Scrophularia nodosa (common name: Figwort), which has nodular roots that resemble the swollen lymph nodes of the affected, was thought to be useful in treating the disease, according to the doctrine of signatures – the plant being hung around the neck of the affected. Figwort does, in fact, contain compounds that can help decrease inflammation, irritation and discomfort.

=== 20th century to present ===
The choice of treatment is highly dependent on the specific type of infection, i.e. NTM or tuberculoid. Furthermore, although many different therapeutic options exist, especially with regards to non-tuberculosis mycobacterial infections – incision and drainage, aspiration biopsy and chemotherapy have all been proven to result in a complete cure of NTM-type infections – different treatments can cause different side-effects, including facial nerve injury and scarring. Therefore, the course of treatment must be tailored to each patient, taking into account their history as well as the severity of infection.

Surgical excision of the scrofula does not work well for M. tuberculosis infections, and has a high rate of recurrence and formation of fistulae. Furthermore, surgery may spread the disease to other organs. The best approach is to use conventional treatment of tuberculosis with antibiotics. The cocktail-drug treatment of tuberculosis (and inactive meningitis) includes rifampicin along with pyrazinamide, isoniazid, ethambutol, and streptomycin ("PIERS").

Scrofula caused by NTM, on the other hand, responds well to surgery, but is usually resistant to antibiotics. The affected nodes can be removed either by repeated aspiration, curettage or total excision (with the risk in the latter procedure, however, often causing unsightly scarring, damage to the facial nerve, or both).

== Prognosis ==
With adequate treatment, clinical remission is practically 100%. In NTM infections, with adequate surgical treatment, clinical remission is greater than 95%. It is recommended that persons in close contact with the diseased person, such as family members, be tested for tuberculosis.

== History and etymology ==
The term 'cervical' refers to the cervical lymph nodes in the neck; it is unrelated to the cervix. The alternative name scrofula comes from the medieval Latin scrōfula, diminutive of scrōfa, meaning brood sow, because swine were supposed to be subject to the complaint, or because the line of elevated lymph nodes was thought to resemble the belly of a breastfeeding sow.

In the beginning of the Modern Age some Western Europeans believed that royal touch, the touch of the sovereign of England or France, could cure diseases owing to the divine right of sovereigns. Henry VI of England is alleged to have cured a girl with it. Scrofula was therefore also known as the King's evil. From 1633, the Book of Common Prayer of the Anglican Church contained a ceremony for this, and it was traditional for the monarch (king or queen) to present to the touched person a coin—usually an angel, a gold coin the value of which varied from about 6 shillings to about 10 shillings. In England this practice continued until the early 18th century, and was continued by the Jacobite pretenders until the extinction of the House of Stuart with the death of the pretender Henry IX. King Henry IV of France is reported as often touching and healing as many as 1,500 individuals at a time. Queen Anne touched the infant Samuel Johnson in 1712. The kings of France continued the custom until Louis XV stopped it in the 18th century, though it was briefly revived by Charles X in 1825.

Physicians, healers, and patent medicine sellers offered a wide range of cures. Among them were treatments involving the chemical element mercury—commonly known as quicksilver, used since antiquity in the mineral ore cinnabar (mercury sulfide), and later prepared as calomel (mercurous chloride)—which was administered as an ointment, pill, or vapor to treat scrofula as well as other skin diseases. Mercury, which is highly toxic when taken internally, induces reactions such as vomiting and sweating which at the time were believed to cure the disease. In 1830, the New-York Medical and Physical Journal continued to recommend mercury as the best cure for scrofula, stating it caused an irritation that would counteract the disease and increased the working of the glands.

Alternative treatments were also offered. Many rejected the harsh side effects of mercury, claiming their cures were made of "natural" or "vegetable" ingredients. Patent medicines labeled as sarsaparilla were recommended for scrofula. Examples of such treatments recommended between the 17th and 19th century include the following:

- Herbalist Nicholas Culpepper (1616–1654) claimed to have treated his daughter for scrofula with lesser celandine, and cured her within a week. Ironically, Culpepper would himself later die of tuberculosis.
- In the 18th century, Elizabeth Pearson, an Irish herbalist, proposed a treatment for scrofula involving herbs and a poultice and extract of vegetable, and in 1815, Sir Gerard Noel presented a petition to the House of Commons advocating her treatment.
- In 1768, the Englishman John Morley produced a handbook entitled Essay on the Nature and Cure of Scrophulous Disorders, Commonly Called the King's Evil. The book starts by listing the typical symptoms and indications of how far the disease had progressed. It then goes into detail with a number of case studies, describing the specific case of the patient, the various treatments used and their effectiveness. The forty-second edition was printed in 1824.
- Richard Carter, a frontier healer in Kentucky, recommended several treatments for the King's Evil, or scrofula, in his 1815 home medical guide Valuable Vegetable Medical Prescriptions for the cure of all Nervous and Putrid Disorders.
- In the 19th century in the United States, the patent medicine Swaim's Panacea was advertised to cure scrofula. Swaim's Panacea contained mercury.

In 1924, French historian Marc Bloch wrote a book on the history of the royal touch: The Royal Touch: Sacred Monarchy and Scrofula in England and France (original in French).

== Case studies ==
A three-year-old healthy young female presented with a bilateral cervical lymph node enlarged. The patient was admitted to the hospital after tuberculosis skin test became positive and further examination showed several other enlarged lymph nodes near her neck. At the hospital, she underwent an exploration surgery where they excised part of her presented lymph node and drained her retropharynx. The drained retropharynx grew methicillin-resistant Staphylococcus epidermidis and Streptococcus mitis. After these findings, the patient received oral linezolid for ten days and had antimicrobial drug therapy for 14 days. Once the patient returned for a follow-up appointment, the lymph node had only slightly decreased in size. Due to this, it had to be completely removed from her neck. Bacterial cultivation of tissue from the excised lymph node resulted in the growth of "atypical Mycobacteria", which were identified by 16S gene sequencing as Mycobacterium florentinum. After she recovered and went home, there were no repeat signs that the infection was back for over a year.

== See also ==
- Scrofuloderma
- Tuberculosis diagnosis
- Tuberculosis treatment
