= Cornelis Dirk Andriesse =

Dutch scientist and writer

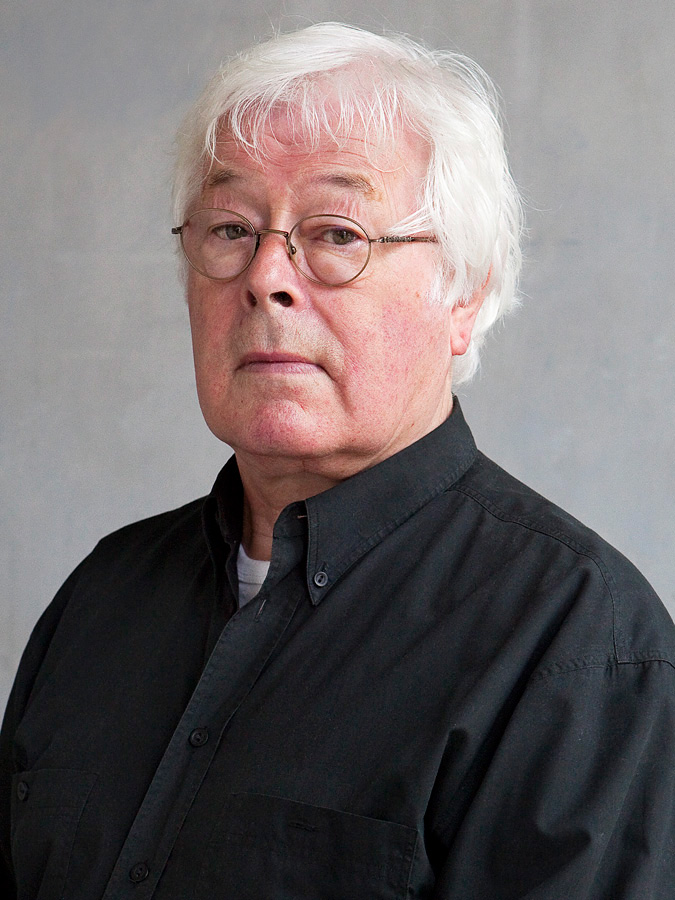
- Cornelis Dirk Andriesse
- Born: 21 December 1939 (age 86); Leeuwarden
- Education: Delft University of Technology
- Known for: scientific biography of Christiaan Huygens
- Scientific career
- Fields: astrophysics, nuclear safety, history of science
- Workplaces: Kapteyn Observatory, KEMA, University of Utrecht

Cornelis Dirk (Cees) Andriesse (Leeuwarden, 21 December 1939) is a Dutch physicist, writer and historian of science. Internationally he is best known for his scientific biography of Christiaan Huygens.

== Education ==
Andriesse studied applied physics at Delft University of Technology, where he specialized in radiation physics. In 1969 he received his PhD degree from the same university with a thesis on the scattering of neutrons in gaseous argon-36. After that, he initiated a research project on the force between noble gas atoms.

== Research ==
He then worked at the Kapteyn Observatory in Roden, part of the University of Groningen. In 1978 he was the first to calculate the radiation of interstellar dust with a fluctuating temperature. Only after the turn of the century Infrared observations from space showed the calculated spectrum to be characteristic of all galaxies. In 1979 Andriesse came up with a theory for the mass loss of stars.

=== Fluctuation Theory ===
There are two classic explanations for the mass loss of stars by stellar winds. For stars of high luminosity radiation pressure is the driving force; for fainter stars like the Sun the stellar wind is driven by mechanical effects such as shock waves or magnetic fields. To what level a stellar wind swells, depends on accidental features of the mechanism. The strength of the wind is not easily related to the basic properties of the star (mass, radius, and luminosity).

Andriesse's fluctuation theory is a metatheory for the two mechanisms mentioned. It does not matter much which mechanism occurs in a certain star, as long as that mechanism meets certain requirements: the stellar wind must take the form of puffs that are so pronounced that they affect the equilibrium between gravitational and thermal forces of the star as a whole. Only after the equilibrium is regained, a subsequent puff may take place.

The fluctuation theory establishes a clear link between the strength of the stellar wind and the basic properties of the star, which, as mentioned above, the mechanisms by themselves cannot establish. Metatheories are not very common in astrophysics. Also fluctuations are usually ignored rather than taken as a starting point. When the fluctuation theory, which Andriesse still sees as his best work, did not gain much acceptance, Andriesse left astrophysics in disappointment in 1980.

=== Nuclear Energy ===
He joined the research institute KEMA of the Dutch electricity companies in Arnhem and started a 'source-term' program, with the aim to determine which and how many radioactive substances would be released by nuclear reactors, when they become overheated. Tiny amounts of uranium oxide, irradiated by neutrons, and thus containing fission products, were heated above 2,000 degrees. When these experiments were under way, the nuclear reactor in Chernobyl exploded. There happened outdoors what Andriesse with his student Richard Tanke were doing inside a safe laboratory His results, presented to the International Atomic Energy Agency, showed that even at very high temperatures most fission products will stay in the reactor core He later cautioned for an explosion of the Petten nuclear reactor caused by a sudden break of the cooling circuit.

== Professor ==
In 1989 Andriesse was appointed professor of electricity supply at the University of Utrecht. This position was paid by KEMA. Commotion arose, when he expressed opinions about the safety of nuclear power plants, which were too negative in the eyes of KEMA. Eventually the conflict was resolved by Andriesse moving to a position financed by the University of Utrecht. As professor of energy physics, he investigated why photovoltaic cells are more efficient in using solar energy than plants. Molecular transport in plant cells turned out to be the limiting factor. For the Energy Research Centre of the Netherlands he studied the Pebble Bed Reactor. In 2002 Andriesse formally retired. He remained active at the Institute for the History and Foundations of Mathematics and Natural Sciences (IGG) of the University of Utrecht for several more years.

== Books ==
After age forty Andriesse started to write fiction for a general audience. In his novels, he steps back from exact science and sketches poetic, often erratic images of a disordered world. His first historical novel "Titan kan niet slapen" ((in English) "Titan cannot sleep") got a place on the longlist of the AKO Literatuurprijs in 1994. It is about the life and works of Christiaan Huygens (1629–1695), and it has been translated in French and English. "De opstand" and "Alsnog een portret voor Heinsius" are historical novels about the physician Gadso Coopmans (1746–1810) and the politician Anthonie Heinsius (1641–1720). He also wrote books about the history of physics, nuclear energy and science publishing.

=== Books available in English ===
- Huygens, The Man Behind the Principle, scientific biography of Christiaan Huygens, translated from Dutch by Sally Miedema, Cambridge University Press, Cambridge, 2005, hardcover, 440 pages, ISBN 0-521-85090-8. Reviews:
  - Gingerich, Owen (21 December 2005). "A Titan of physics". Nature. 438 (7071): 1083–1084. Bibcode:2005Natur.438.1083G. doi:10.1038/4381083a. ISSN 1476-4687.
  - by Hansjörg Geiges in Times Higher Education Supplement of 13 January 2006
  - by Stéphane Van Damme in Notes & Records of the Royal Society 60 (2006) 219–220
- Dutch Messengers, A History of Science Publishing 1930–1980, Brill Publishers, Leiden, 2008, hardcover, 291 pages, ISBN 978-90-04-17084-1. Reviews:
  - by Arnold Lubbers in Library & Information History 25 (2009) 205–206
  - by Adriaan van der Weel in Logos 21 (2010) 129–132
  - by Mary Jo Nye in BMGN – Low Countries Historical Review 126(3) (2011) 137–138
