= Arthur Goldhammer =

American translator and academic

Arthur Goldhammer (born November 17, 1946) is an American academic and translator.

== Early life ==
Goldhammer studied mathematics at MIT, gaining his PhD in 1973.

== Career ==
Since 1977 he has worked as a translator. He is based at the Center for European Studies at Harvard.

Goldhammer is a four-time winner of the French-American Foundation translation prize, including for his translations of Alexis de Tocqueville's The Ancien Régime and the French Revolution and Democracy in America.

Goldhammer's translation of Thomas Piketty's book Capital in the Twenty-First Century became a New York Times best-seller.

== Personal life ==
Goldhammer lives in Cambridge, Massachusetts.

== Works translated ==
- The institutions of France under the absolute monarchy, 1598–1789 by Roland Mousnier, 2 vols, 1979–1984.
- The three orders: feudal society imagined by Georges Duby, 1980.
- Time, work & culture in the Middle Ages by Jacques Le Goff, 1980.
- The Arabs by Maxime Rodinson, 1981.
- Medieval slavery and liberation by Pierre Dockès, 1981.
- The heights of power: an essay on the power elite in France: with a new postscript, 1981 by Pierre Birnbaum, 1982.
- Nature's second kingdom: explorations of vegetality in the eighteenth century by François Delaporte, 1982.
- The psychiatric society by Robert Castel, Françoise Castel, and Anne Lovell, 1982.
- The sociology of the state by Bertrand Badie and Pierre Birnbaum, 1983.
- The birth of purgatory by Jacques Le Goff, 1984
- Understanding Imperial Russia: state and society in the old regime by Marc Raeff, 1984
- How New York stole the idea of modern art: Abstract expressionism, freedom, and the cold war by Serge Guilbaut, 1985
- Montaigne in motion by Jean Starobinski, 1985.
- Disease and civilization: the cholera in Paris, 1832 by François Delaporte, 1986.
- Outside: selected writings by Marguerite Duras, 1986.
- To be a slave in Brazil, 1550–1888 by Katia de Queirós Mattoso, 1986.
- Homosexuality in Greek Myth by Bernard Sergent, 1986.
- The Poor in the Middle Ages: An Essay in Social History by Michel Mollat, 1986.
- From Pagan Rome to Byzantium. A History of private life, vol. I, ed. Paul Veyne. Cambridge, Massachusetts: Belknap Press of Harvard University Press, 1987.
- In the beginning was love: psychoanalysis and faith by Julia Kristeva, 1987
- Ideology and rationality in the history of the life sciences by Georges Canguilhem, 1988.
- Revelations of the medieval world. A history of private life, vol. II, ed. Georges Duby and Philippe Aries, 1988.
- The medieval imagination by Jacques Le Goff. Chicago: University of Chicago Press, 1988.
- Jean-Jacques Rousseau, transparency and obstruction by Jean Starobinski, 1988.
- Wind spirit: an autobiography by Michel Tournier, 1988.
- Passions of the Renaissance. A history of private life, vol. III, ed. Roger Chartier, 1989.
- Dionysos at large by Marcel Detienne, 1989.
- A critical dictionary of the French Revolution, ed. François Furet and Mona Ozouf, 1989.
- The living eye by Jean Starobinski, 1989.
- From the Fires of Revolution to the Great War. A history of private life, vol. IV, ed. Michelle Perrot, 1990.
- Greek virginity by Giulia Sissa, 1990.
- The history of yellow fever: an essay on the birth of tropical medicine by François Delaporte, 1991.
- Between church and state: the lives of four French prelates in the late Middle Ages by Bernard Guené, 1991.
- A history of private life. Vol.5: Riddles of identity in modern times, ed. Antoine Prost and Gérard Vincent, 1991.
- The Vichy syndrome: history and memory in France since 1944 by Henry Rousso, 1991.
- The Village of Cannibals: Rage and Murder in France, 1870 by Alain Corbin, 1992.
- The Languages of Paradise: Race, Religion, and Philology in the Nineteenth Century by Maurice Olender, Cambridge, Massachusetts: Harvard University Press, 1992.
- A History of women in the West. 1, From ancient goddesses to Christian saints, ed. Pauline Schmitt Pantel, 1992.
- Sade: biography by Maurice Lever, 1993.
- Blessings in disguise, or the morality of evil by Jean Starobinski, 1993.
- A vital rationalist: selected writings from Georges Canguilhem by Georges Canguilhem, ed. François Delaporte], 1994.
- History continues by Georges Duby, 1994.
- Histories: French constructions of the past, ed. Jacques Revel and Lynn Hunt, 1995.
- A Small City in France by Françoise Gaspard, 1995.
- Realms of Memory: Rethinking the French Past, ed. Pierre Nora, 1996–98. 3 vols.
- The Beggar and the Professor: A Sixteenth-Century Family Saga by Emmanuel Le Roy Ladurie, 1997
- The Roman Empire by Paul Veyne, 1997.
- France in the enlightenment by Daniel Roche, 1998.
- (tr. with others) Literary debate: Text and Context, ed. by Denis Hollier and Jeffrey Mehlman, 1999.
- The Measure of the World: A Novel by Denis Guedj, 2001
- Saint-Simon and the court of Louis XIV by Emmanuel Le Roy Ladurie, with the collaboration of Jean-François Fitou, 2001.
- (tr. with others) Antiquities, ed. by Nicole Loraux, Gregory Nagy and Laura Slatkin, 2001.
- Paris: Capital of the World by Patrice Higonnet, 2002.
- Democracy in America by Alexis de Tocqueville, 2003.
- The kill by Émile Zola, 2004.
- Camus at Combat: writing 1944–1947 by Albert Camus, 2006
- Inscription and erasure: literature and written culture from the eleventh to the eighteenth century by Roger Chartier, 2007
- Vital nourishment : departing from happiness by François Jullien, 2007
- The demands of liberty: civil society in France since the Revolution by Pierre Rosanvallon, 2007.
- Counter-Democracy: Politics in an Age of Distrust by Pierre Rosanvallon, 2008.
- Alexis de Tocqueville and Gustave de Beaumont in America: Their Friendship and Their Travels by Alexis de Tocqueville and Gustave de Beaumont, ed. Oliver Zunz, 2010
- The Ancien Régime and the French Revolution by Alexis de Tocqueville, Cambridge: Cambridge University Press, 2011.
- Democratic Legitimacy: Impartiality, Reflexivity, Proximity by Pierre Rosanvallon, 2011
- Empire's Children: Race, Filiation, and Citizenship in the French Colonies by Emmanuelle Saada, 2012.
- Capital in the Twenty-First Century by Thomas Piketty, 2014
- The Economics of Inequality by Thomas Piketty, 2015
- Capital and Ideology by Thomas Piketty, 2020
