= Journal of My Life =

Autobiography

- Cover of U.S. paperback edition
- Editor: Daniel Roche
- Author: Jacques-Louis Ménétra
- Original title: Journal de ma vie
- Translator: Arthur Goldhammer
- Language: French
- Genre: Nonfiction
- Publisher: Columbia University Press
- Publication date: 1982
- Publication place: France
- English publication date: 1986
- Media type: Print
- Pages: 368 pp.
- ISBN: 0-231-06128-5

Journal of My Life (French: Journal de ma vie) is an autobiography by Jacques-Louis Ménétra, an eighteenth-century master glazier in Paris. Begun in 1764, when Ménétra returned from a journeyman's tour of the French provinces, Ménétra's text intersperses accounts of his life on the road and in Paris with tall tales, braggadocio, jokes, and accounts of his seductions and pranks. In the words of historian Robert Darnton, Ménétra's narrative "restores the human dimension to the study of social conditions and brings flesh and blood to lifeless sociological categories. What we can finally see, with the help of these memoirs, is ordinary, everyday life."

== Overview ==
The provenance of the manuscript of Ménétra's Journal is unknown, according to scholar William Reddy. The manuscript was found in the Bibliothèque historique de la ville de Paris, having been donated by a book collector at an unknown date. Ménétra made no attempt to publish the Journal during his life.

Reddy goes on to describe the work:

At first the manuscript appears to be nothing but a catalogue of barroom tales arranged in chronological order. Ménétra speaks in order to impress the way people do in bars: as if to say "Wait till you hear what happened to me!" He tells of his fights with his father, his workplace accidents, his run-ins with highwaymen, his amorous adventures with maidservants and masters' wives, and above all his glorious activities as member of the secret journeymen's brotherhood, Les Compagnons du Devoir. The tales succeed one another without any attempt to develop specific themes or organize an argument or explore particular issues, dilemmas, or problems. There is no tension or plot. Ménétra's style is highly elliptical, often to the point of obscurity. Yet the cumulative effect is nonetheless powerful. As one ridiculous or self-glorifying story succeeds another, the reader begins to discern the clear outlines of a personality and the shape of an individual life.

== Critical commentary ==
Historian Leslie Choquette wrote of Ménétra: "He is, to my mind, the prototypical Frenchman of the eighteenth century."

David Hopkin hailed Ménétra's Journal as "one of few unforced personal testimonies we have from a member of the French popular classes of the eighteenth century."

Hopkin explained the motifs of the memoir:

Long before he was a writer Ménétra was, as Robert Darnton argues in his preface to the English edition of the Journal, a storyteller. His memoirs include occasions on which he entertained his colleagues and acquaintances with spicy anecdotes of his amorous exploits. His nickname among his fellow journeymen,'the welcome Parisian', is indicative of the enhanced status such narrative talent earned him in this world of youthful male sociability. But Ménétra was also a teller of stories in the colloquial sense of the term, in that he was frequently 'economical with the truth'. To construct his memoirs he drew on a fund of popular motifs concerning social bandits, prodigal sons, nubile nuns and bawdy matrons, some of which he acquired from the cheap street literature of the time, but much of which also belonged to oral popular culture. It is unlikely that Ménétra only had recourse to these motifs in his written work; they were already part of his storytelling repertoire (or as Darnton puts it, his Journal is an extension of his 'bull sessions'). We can reasonably deduce from Ménétra's example that the communicative processes of the early modern artisan included recognizable genres of what folklorists call 'oral literature', such as folktales, legends, jokes and proverbs.

William Reddy reviewed Ménétra's Journal in The Journal of Modern History:

On the whole, given the inherent importance of the document and the excellent, thorough annotation and analysis provided by Roche, this book represents an invaluable package for anyone working on eighteenth-century social history. It is a lovely companion piece to Roche's own recently published Le peuple de Paris (Paris, 1981) and a marvelous addition to the list of nineteenth-century working-class memoirs and writings that have recently been republished (one thinks of Martin Nadaud, Louise Michel, Denis Poulot, Agricole Perdiguier). The laboring poor, once thought to be silent, are beginning to speak to us with their own mellifluous voices.

Roger Chartier points out that Ménétra's text has helped establish that people of humble social status owned books that were not aimed at them.

Lisa Jane Graham, writing in The Journal of Modern History, describes Ménétra's Journal as an example of "low Enlightenment" culture, an example of how "[t]he Enlightenment clearly strayed beyond glittering portals into much shabbier abodes."

Raymond Birn, writing in Eighteenth-Century Studies, points out the importance of Ménétra's Journal as a historical document:

[B]eneath the surface of Ménétra's consciousness, a theme does appear to prevail. It is the struggle for liberty—the liberty to work or not work, to select companions and friends irrespective of conventional social restraints, to make love as one sees fit, to choose between social integration and dissociation. Working against Ménétra's quest are political and economic realities beyond his control; personal conflicts with his father, wife, and children; and, of course, the biological fact of physical decline. The tension of a complete life provides the drama for Ménétra's story. It may not be high tragedy, but it isn't farce either. The story is a precious social and personal document, and Ménétra's is a rare voice among the silent majority of the past, the unveiling of whose universe has been the most significant accomplishment of historians of our generation.

== Sources ==
- Birn, Raymond (Spring 1986). "Review of Journal de ma vie. Jacques-Louis Menetra, Compagnon vitrier au 18 Siecle by Daniel Roche". Eighteenth-Century Studies. 19 (3): 404–406. doi:10.2307/2738931. JSTOR 2738931.
- Chartier, Roger (Summer 1992). "Laborers and Voyagers: From the Text to the Reader". Diacritics. 22 (2). Translated by González, J. A.: 49–61. doi:10.2307/465279. JSTOR 465279.
- Choquette, Leslie (2002). "Presentation (Round Table Discussion of Frenchmen into Peasants)". French Colonial History. 2: 1–9. doi:10.1353/fch.2011.0012. JSTOR 41938117.
- Darnton, Robert (1986). Foreword. Journal of My Life. By Menetra, Jacques-Louis. Roche, Daniel (ed.). Translated by Arthur Goldhammer. New York: Columbia University Press. p. 11. ISBN 978-0-231-06129-2.
- Graham, Lisa Jane (June 2000). "Review of Enlightenment Portraits by Michel Voyelle and Lydia G. Cochrane". The Journal of Modern History. 72 (2): 527–529. doi:10.1086/316012. JSTOR 10.1086/316012.
- Hopkin, David M. (May 2004). "Storytelling, Fairytales and Autobiography: Some Observations on Eighteenth- and Nineteenth-Century French Soldiers' and Sailors' Memoirs". Social History. 29 (2): 186–198. doi:10.1080/0307102042000207840. JSTOR 4287077. S2CID 144846336.
- Menetra, Jacques-Louis (1986). Roche, Daniel (ed.). Journal of My Life. Translated by Arthur Goldhammer. New York: Columbia University Press. ISBN 978-0-231-06129-2.
- Reddy, William M. (March 1984). "Journal de ma vie: Jacques-Louis Ménétra, compagnon vitrier au 18e siècle (review)". The Journal of Modern History. 56 (1): 151–153. doi:10.1086/242640. JSTOR 1878201.
