= Helen H. Bacon =

American classical philologist (1919–2007)

Helen Hazard Bacon
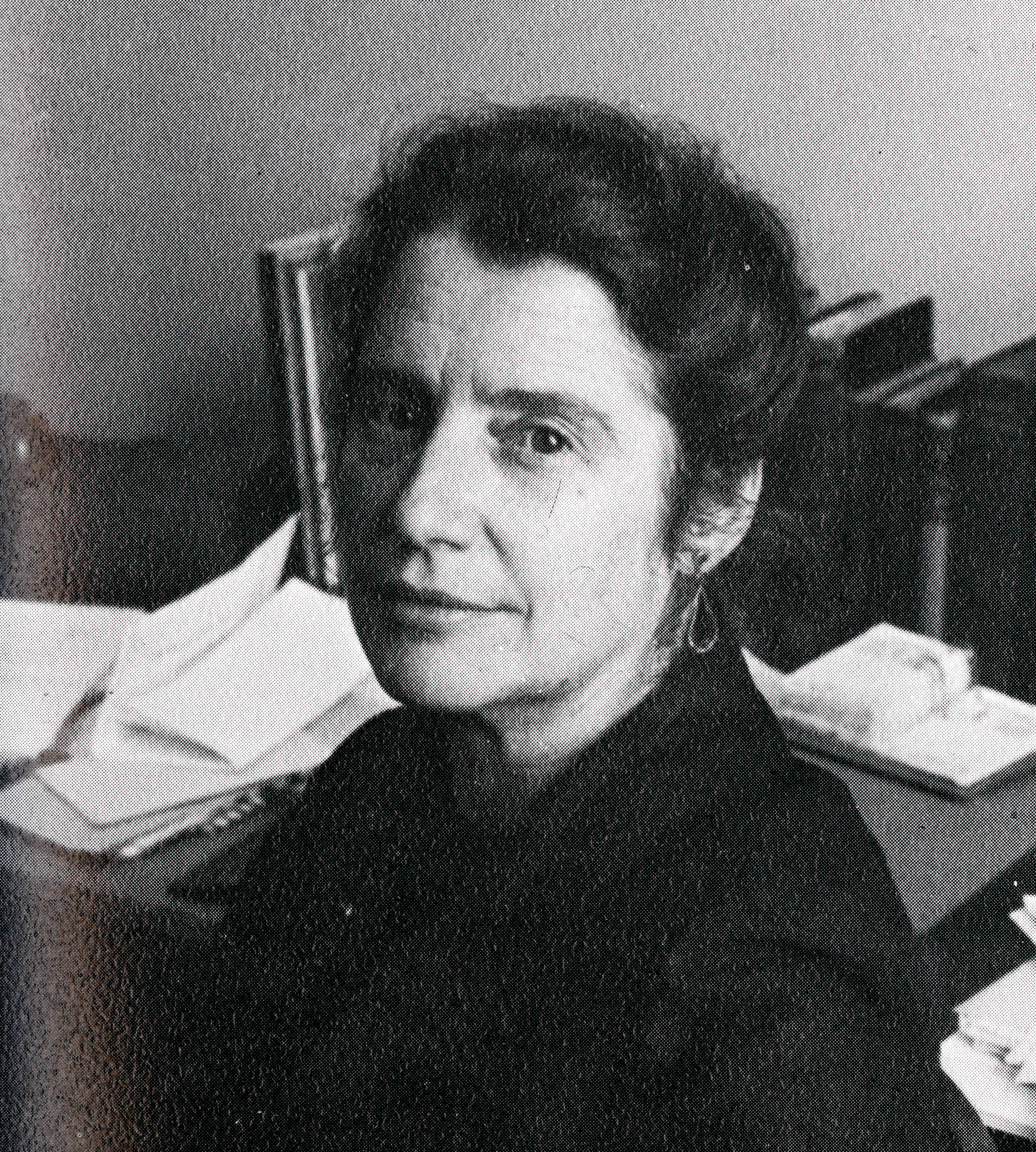
- Professor Helen H. Bacon (1966)
- Born: March 9, 1919; Berkeley, California
- Died: November 9, 2007 (aged 88); Williamsburg, Massachusetts
- Parent(s): Leonard Bacon and Martha Stringham Bacon

Academic background
- Education: Bryn Mawr College
- Thesis: Barbarians in Greek Tragedy
- Doctoral advisor: Richmond Lattimore

Academic work
- Discipline: Classics
- Institutions: Barnard College

Helen Hazard Bacon (March 9, 1919 – November 9, 2007) was professor of classics at Barnard College. She was known in particular for her work on Greek tragedy, especially Aeschylus. Bacon was also well known for her work on classical themes in the poetry of Robert Frost and in the mythological writing of Edith Hamilton. Bacon was president of the American Philological Association in 1985.

== Career ==
Bacon spent her childhood first in Berkeley and then in Florence where her father, the poet Leonard Bacon, and her mother, the painter Martha Stringham Bacon, had settled amongst a group of fellow artists. The family returned to the United States in 1932 and Bacon went on to read classics at Bryn Mawr College, gaining her BA in 1940.

In 1942 Bacon paused her graduate studies at the University of California, Berkeley (1940–1941) and Harvard University (1942) to join the United States Naval Reserve as a Women Accepted for Volunteer Emergency Service (WAVES). She worked in the Navy's Communications Annex in Washington, D.C. where she was a cryptanalyst decoding Japanese radio communications. Bacon was one of a number of classicists employed by the Navy in this field of work, including her Bryn Mawr College professor, Richmond Lattimore. Bacon was known as "Bake" by her colleagues.

Following World War II, Bacon returned to graduate studies at Bryn Mawr College and completed her PhD in 1955 with a dissertation entitled "Barbarians in Greek Tragedy", which was published by Yale University Press in 1961. Bacon taught at the University of North Carolina at Greensboro, then the Woman's College of the University of North Carolina. Bacon also held a Fulbright Fellowship for a year to study at the American School of Classical Studies at Athens (1952–1953).

Bacon then taught at Smith College from 1953 to 1961. While still untenured in 1960, Bacon organised support amongst Smith College faculty and wider academic community for two junior colleagues who had been reported and arrested for possessing homosexual pornography. Although the two were subsequently exonerated, Smith College fired them. Bacon succeeded in getting the college to pay her colleagues back pay but not the reinstatement of their jobs. Bacon gained tenure after this episode but decided to leave Smith College shortly afterwards. The events of the time were recounted in Barry Werth's The Scarlet Professor Newton Arvin: A Literary Life Shattered by Scandal (2001). The American Civil Liberties Union of Massachusetts awarded Bacon the David Burres Award in a ceremony at the Smith College Archives on April 29, 2002, stating that Bacon was amongst those:

heroes who speak out for civil liberties when it counts most—at the moment when individual rights are violated.

Bacon spent the rest of her career at Barnard College, where she taught classics from 1961 to her retirement in 1989. She had permanent impact on the department when as chair Bacon made modern Greek a permanent part of the curriculum and started the tradition of the annual Barnard College Greek or Latin play. During this time, Bacon was a director of the American Philological Association (1976–79) and became president in 1985, the third woman elected as president.

Bacon taught graduate courses regularly at Columbia University and was a visiting professor at Harvard University and Hampshire College. During her summer vacations, Bacon taught classics in translation at the Bread Loaf School of English at Middlebury College, and she was awarded an honorary doctorate there in 1970. With Pulitzer Prize poet Anthony Hecht, Bacon translated Aeschylus' Seven Against Thebes, which was nominated for a National Book Award in 1973.

During her retirement, Bacon was a trustee of Meekins Library in Williamsburg from 1996 to 2001.

== Work ==
In her presidential address to the American Philological Association in 1985, Bacon talked about her "lifelong preoccupation with the importance of the esthetic and literary features of Plato's work". The content summary note for the Helen H. Bacon Papers, held at the library of Barnard College, describes her work as focusing on Aeschylus, Plato, Vergil, and Apuleius and the comic novel on the classical side, but including work on Robert Frost and Edith Hamilton which is more properly categorized as classical reception studies. An obituary in scholarly journal The Classical World, written by Nancy Felson, Deborah Roberts, and Laura Slatkin described her as "well ahead of her time", a "pioneer", and "anticipat[ing] subsequent directions in the field", on account of Bacon's engagement with literary theory and psychoanalytic theory. Among her published articles and papers, Bacon wrote two books. Barbarians in Greek Tragedy (1961) details the ways in which foreigners were characterised in the works of Aeschylus, Sophocles, and Euripides. The second, a translation and introduction to Aeschylus' Seven Against Thebes, was co-authored with Anthony Hecht (1973). The translation was nominated for a National Book Award.

== Selected publications ==
- "The Furies' Homecoming". Classical Philology. 96 (1): 48–59. January 2001. doi:10.1086/449523. S2CID 162160319.
- “Mortal Father, Divine Mother: Aeneid IV and VIII,” in Poets and Critics Read Vergil, ed. Sarah Spence (New Haven: Yale UP, 2001) pp. 76–85
- "The Chorus in Greek Life and Drama". Arion. 3 (1). Boston University: 6–24. 1994.
- “The Poetry of Phaedo,” in Cabinet of the Muses: Essays on Classical and Comparative Literature in Honor of Thomas G. Rosenmeyer, ed. Mark Griffith & Donald J. Mastronarde (Atlanta, GA: Scholars Press, 1990) pp. 147–162
- "The Aeneid as a Drama of Election". Transactions of the American Philological Association. 116: 305–334. 1986. doi:10.2307/283922. JSTOR 283922.
- “Aeschylus and Early Tragedy,” in Ancient Writers: Greece, ed. T.J. Luce (New York: Scribner's, 1982)
- "For Girls: From "Birches" to "Wild Grapes"". The Yale Review. 67 (1): 13–29. October 1977.
- “In- and Outdoor Schooling: Robert Frost and the Classics,” American Scholar 43,4 (Autumn 1974) pp. 640–9
- Aeschylus (1973). Seven against Thebes. Translated by Hecht, Anthony; Bacon, Helen H. Oxford University Press. ISBN 9780195070071.
- Classical Aspects of Female Sexuality. Woman's Two Faces: Sophocles' View of the Tragedy of Oedipus and His Family. New York: Grune & Stratton. 1966. pp. 10–24.
- "The Shield of Eteocles". Arion. 3 (3): 27–38. 1964.
- Barbarians in Greek tragedy. Yale University Press. 1961. OCLC 1609933.
- “Socrates Crowned,” Virginia Quarterly Review 35 (1959) pp. 415–30
- The Sibyl in the Bottle (1958)
