= Felson =

Felson is the surname of:

- Nancy Felson, American classical scholar
- Richard Felson (born 1950), American sociologist
- "Fast Eddie" Felson, protagonist of the film The Hustler and its sequel, The Color of Money, played by Paul Newman

== See also ==
- Felsen, another surname
