= Marcel Detienne =

Belgian historian (1935–2019)

Marcel Detienne (French: [dətjɛn]; October 11, 1935, Liège, Belgium – March 21, 2019, Nemours, France) was a Belgian historian and specialist in the study of ancient Greece. He was a professor at Johns Hopkins University, where he held the Basil L. Gildersleeve chair in Classics.

Along with Jean-Pierre Vernant and Pierre Vidal-Naquet, Detienne has sought to apply an anthropological approach, informed by the structuralism of Claude Lévi-Strauss, to classical and archaic Greece.

== Biography ==
Detienne received his Doctorat en sciences religieuses at the École des Hautes Études in 1960, and his Doctorat en philosophie et lettres from the University of Liège in 1965.

Detienne was at one time a directeur d'études at the École pratique des hautes études, where he taught until 1998. He was also a founder of the Centre de recherches comparées sur les sociétés anciennes in Paris. Detienne began teaching in the Department of Classics at Johns Hopkins University in 1992.

== Bibliography ==
- Homère, Hésiode et Pythagore: poésie et philosophie dans le pythagorisme ancien (1962)
- Crise agraire et attitude religieuse chez Hésiode (1963)
- De la pensée religieuse à la pensée philosophique (1963)
- Les Maîtres de vérité dans la Grèce archaïque (1967; trans. Janet Lloyd, The Masters of Truth in Archaic Greece (1996)
- Les Jardins d'Adonis (1972; trans. Janet Lloyd, The Gardens of Adonis, 1977; 2nd ed. 1994)
- Les ruses de l'intelligence: la métis des Grecs (with Jean-Pierre Vernant, 1974; trans. Janet Lloyd, Cunning Intelligence in Greek Culture and Society, 1978)
- Dionysos mis à mort (1977; trans. Mireille & Leonard Muellener, Dionysos Slain, 1979)
- La cuisine du sacrifice en pays grec (with Jean-Pierre Vernant et al., 1979; trans. Paula Wissing, The Cuisine of Sacrifice among the Greeks, 1989)
- L'invention de la mythologie (1981; trans. Margaret Cook, The Creation of Mythology, 1986)
- Dionysos à ciel ouvert (1986; trans. Arthur Goldhammer, Dionysos at Large, 1989)
- Les Savoirs de l’écriture en Grèce ancienne (with Georgio Camassa, 1988)
- L' écriture d'Orphée (1989; trans. Janet Lloyd, The Writing of Orpheus: Greek Myth in Cultural Context, 2003)
- La vie quotidienne des dieux grecs (with Giulia Sissa, 1989; trans. Janet Lloyd, The Daily Life of the Greek Gods, 2000)
- Apollon le couteau à la main (1998)
- Comparer l'incomparable (2002; trans. Janet Lloyd, Comparing the Incomparable, 2008)
- Comment être autochtone: du pur Athénien au Français raciné (2003)
- Qui veut prendre la parole? (2003)
- Les Grecs et nous (2005; trans. Janet Lloyd, The Greeks and Us: A Comparative Anthropology of Ancient Greece, 2007)

As editor or co-editor

- Transcrire les mythologies: tradition, écriture, historicité (1994)
- Destin de Meurtriers (1996)
