= Leonard Bacon (poet) =

American poet

- Born: May 26, 1887; Solvay, New York, U.S.
- Died: January 1, 1954 (aged 66); Peace Dale, Rhode Island, U.S.
- Education: Yale University (BA)
- Occupation: Poet
- Spouse: Martha Stringham
- Children: 3, including Helen H. Bacon

Leonard Bacon (1887–1954) was an American poet, translator, and literary critic. The great-grandson of preacher Leonard Bacon, he graduated from Yale University in 1909, and subsequently taught at University of California, Berkeley until 1923. In 1923, he started publishing poetry in the Saturday Review of Literature under the pseudonym 'Autolycus'. He and his family lived in Florence, Italy from 1927 to 1932. He won the 1941 Pulitzer Prize for Poetry for his satiric poems Sunderland Capture. He was elected a Fellow of the American Academy of Arts and Sciences in 1942.

== Works ==
- The Ballad of Blonay (1906)
- The Scrannel Pipe (1909)
- The Heroic Ballads of Servia (1913) (Translated from Spanish)
- Chanson de Roland (1914) (Translated from French)
- The Cid (1919) (Translated from Spanish)
- Sophia Trenton (1920)
- Ulug Beg (1923)
- Ph.D.s (1925)
- Animula Vagula (1926)
- Guinea-fowl and other Poultry (1927)
- The Legend of Quincibald (1928)
- Lost Buffalo, and other Poems (1930)
- The Furioso (1932)
- Dream and Action (1934)
- The Voyage of Autoleon (1935)
- The Goose on the Capital (1936)
- Rhyme and Punishment (1936)
- Bullinger Bound (1938)
- Semi-Centennial (1939)
- Sunderland Capture (1940) (Winner of the Pulitzer Prize)
- Day of Fire (1943)
- The Lusiads (1950) (Translated from Portuguese)
