= Boris Porshnev =

Soviet historian (1905–1972)

Boris Fyodorovich Porshnev (Russian: Бори́с Фёдорович По́ршнев; 7 March [O.S. 22 February] 1905, in Saint Petersburg – 26 November 1972, in Moscow) was a Soviet historian known for his works on popular revolts in Ancien Régime France and a doctor of philosophical and historical sciences, working on psychology, prehistory, and neurolinguistics as relating to the origins of man.

== Cryptozoology ==
Porshnev took interest in cryptozoology and has been described with Marie-Jeanne Koffman as the "revered parents of Russian monster-hunting." Porshnev led several Soviet expeditions to the Pamir Mountains and north-western Himalayas to search for the Mongolian "Almas" (wild man). He was driven by a Marxist ideology to find the "wild man" to confirm materialism and evolutionary human origins. He believed that the almas were a relict population of the Neanderthals who had survived the Ice Age of the Pleistocene epoch. His expeditions were unsuccessful and his career went into decline.

In the late 1960s, Porshnev's idea that relict Neanderthals could explain Asian or Russian bigfoot sightings became known as the "Porshnev theory". The idea influenced cryptozoologists Bernard Heuvelmans and Ivan T. Sanderson. Porshnev co-authored a book in French with Heuvelmans which argued that Neanderthals still exist. It has not been translated into English.

Porshnev was given permission by the Soviet Academy of Sciences to establish a Commission to study the question of relict hominids. Although it was later dissolved, in 1963 he produced a book summarising the evidence the commission had obtained and his views on Neanderthal survival which was circulated in a limited number of copies. A copy of the book was obtained by the Centre for Fortean Zoology (CFZ) and translated; it was published in 2021 with maps, illustrations, notes and an index.

== Selected publications ==
- Les soulèvements populaires en France de 1623 à 1648, S.E.V.P.E.N., Paris, 1963; reprinted as Les soulèvements populaires en France au XVIIe siècle, Flammarion, Paris, 1972.
- Les buts et les revendications des paysans lors de la révolte bretonne de 1675, in Les Bonnets Rouges, Union Générale d'Éditions (collection 10/18), Paris, 1975.
- in collaboration with Bernard Heuvelmans: L'homme de Néanderthal est toujours vivant, 1974.

The original edition of LES SOULEVEMENTS POPULAIRES ... appeared in Russian as NARODNIE VOSSTANYA VO FRANTSII PERED FRONDOI,1623-1648 (Moscow, 1948).

== See also ==
- On the Beginning of Human History
- Revolt of the Bonnets Rouges
- Roland Mousnier
