= Pierre Rosanvallon =

French historian and sociologist (born 1948)

Pierre Rosanvallon LH
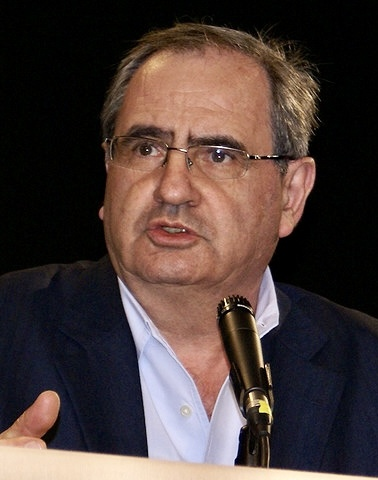
- Rosanvallon in 2009
- Born: 1 January 1948 (age 78); Blois, France
- Education: HEC Paris; School for Advanced Studies in the Social Sciences
- Occupations: Historian; Political scientist

Pierre Rosanvallon (French: [ʁozɑ̃valɔ̃]; born 1 January 1948) is a French left historian and sociologist. He was named a professor at the Collège de France in 2001, holding the chair in modern and contemporary political history.

His works are dedicated to the history of democracy, French political history, the role of the state and the question of social justice in contemporary societies.

== Career ==
He is also director of studies at the École des hautes études en sciences sociales, where he led the Raymond Aron Centre of Political Researches between 1992 and 2005. Rosanvallon was in the 1970s one of the primary theoreticians of workers' self-management in the French Democratic Confederation of Labour (CFDT) trade union.

He graduated from the Hautes Études Commerciales (HEC) management school with a PhD from the École des hautes études en sciences sociales. In 1982, he created the Fondation Saint-Simon think-tank, along with François Furet. The Fondation dissolved in December 1999. Rosanvallon is a member of the Scientific Counsels of both the French National Library (since 2002) and the École normale supérieure (since 2004) in Paris.

Rosanvallon created in 2002 the "intellectual workshop" La République des Idées, which publishes a review and books.

== Publishings ==
- L'Âge de l'autogestion, Le Seuil, coll. Points politique, 1976.
- Le capitalisme utopique: critique de idéologie economique. Editions du Seuil, 1979.
- La Crise de l'État-providence, Editions du Seuil, 1981 .
- Le Moment Guizot, Gallimard, 1985.
- L'État en France de 1789 à nos jours, Editions du Seuil, L'Univers historique, 1990.
- La Monarchie impossible Fayard 1994
- La Nouvelle Question sociale, Points, Essais, 1995 (transl. in 2000, The New Social Question: Rethinking the Welfare State, ISBN 978-0-691-01640-5)
- Le Nouvel Âge des inégalités, (Avec Jean-Paul Fitoussi), Editions du Seuil, 1996
- Le Peuple introuvable : Histoire de la représentation démocratique en France, Folio Histoire, 1998.
- La Démocratie inachevée. Histoire de la souveraineté du peuple en France, Gallimard, Bibliothèque des histoires, 2000, Folio Histoire extraits déchargables
- Le capitalisme utopique: Histoire de l'idée du marché. Editions de Seuil, 1999.
- Le Sacre du citoyen. Histoire du suffrage universel en France, Folio Histoire, 2001
- Pour une histoire conceptuelle du politique, Editions du Seuil, 2003
- Le Modèle politique français. La société civile contre le jacobinisme de 1789 à nos jours, Le Seuil, 2004
- Democracy Past and Future, (Columbia University Press, ed. Samuel Moyn, 2006) ISBN 0-231-13740-0 (excerpts)
- The Demands of Liberty — Civil Society in France since the Revolution, Harvard 2007, ISBN 0-674-02496-6
- La contre-démocratie. La politique à l'âge de la défiance, Seuil, 2006.
  - Engl.: Counter-democracy : politics in an age of distrust, Cambridge University Press, New York 2008, ISBN 0-521-88622-8
- La légitimité démocratique. Impartialité, réflexivité, proximité, Editions du Seuil, Paris 2008.
  - Engl.: Democratic legitimacy: impartiality, reflexivity, proximity, translated by Arthur Goldhammer, Princeton University Press, Princeton 2011, ISBN 978-0-691-14948-6
- La société des égaux, Paris: Seuil, 2011.
- Refaire société, Collectif, préface par Pierre Rosanvallon, avec Christian Baudelot, Magali Bessone, Robert Castel, François Dubet, Armand Hatchuel, Blanche Segrestin, Cécile Van de Velde, Seuil, La République des idées, 2011 ISBN 978-2-0210-5431-6.
  - Engl.: The Society of Equals, translated by Arthur Goldhammer, Agatha Berge-Corcuff, Harvard University Press, 2013, ISBN 978-0-674-72459-4
- Le Parlement des invisibles ( Manifeste pour "raconter la vie"), Le Seuil 2014 ISBN 2370210168
- Le Bon Gouvernement, Le Seuil, 2015 ISBN 978-2-02-122422-1
- Notre Histoire intellectuelle et politique, 1968-2018, Le Seuil, 2018 ISBN 978-2-02-135126-2
- Les épreuves de la vie, Le Seuil 2021 ISBN 978-2021486438
