= On the Beginning of Human History =

1974 treatise by Boris Fyodorovich Porshnev

- Author: B. F. Porshnev
- Genre: Monograph
- Publisher: Mysl

On the Beginning of Human History (Problems of Paleopsychology) is a philosophical and natural-scientific treatise (Note: Authors' definitions.) by Soviet historian Boris Fyodorovich Porshnev, dedicated to the problems of anthropogenesis. The initial concept for a book on human prehistory dates back to 1924, although Porshnev directly addressed the topic of the emergence of Homo sapiens in the 1950s in connection with his interest in troglodytidae and the issue of the "snowman". After 1968, the researcher's work was entirely devoted to writing and publishing On the Beginning of Human History, which he considered the main research work of his life.

The book presents a complex interdisciplinary study at the intersection of physical anthropology, evolutionary psychology, sociology, philosophy of history, and other disciplines. The "beginning" highlighted in the title was, in the author's view, is a key to the entire complex of sciences about human society and the individual within society, creating a research program. For Porshnev, there was a fundamental distinction between humans and all other animals (an "evolutionary gap"), rooted in creativity, which is absent in any animal, even in rudimentary form.

B. F. Porshnev's theory of anthropogenesis centers on the “individual-to-individual” model of interaction rather than the “individual-to-environment” approach. He traced the emergence of human communication, consciousness, and creativity from physiological mechanisms of animal interaction, arguing that human labor originated among Tertiary-period troglodytids—corpse-eating scavengers who accidentally mastered fire while processing bones. Their evolving behavior led to intra-species hunting and eventually to the ecological divergence that produced Homo neanderthalensis. Porshnev's monograph, completed in 1972, was initially censored for revising Marxist interpretations of human evolution and published in abridged form in 1974; restored editions appeared from the 1990s onward. His hypothesis, criticized for speculative reasoning and reliance on limited evidence —especially regarding Neanderthals' role— has not been widely accepted. Yet, scholars such as Galin Tihanov regard Porshnev's fusion of psychology and history as one of the most original contributions to Soviet humanistic thought in the late 20th century.

== General idea ==
B. F. Porshnev's monograph is structured as an "enfilade of chapters", in the introduction of which the author outlined the purpose of his work and its place in his own scholarship. He emphasized the problem of identifying the "beginning" of humanity and human history, as it remains unclear what exactly is meant by "beginning" in a general philosophical sense: Porshnev placed the "individual to individual" model at the center of his research. The primary focus of the book is the study of the transformation of animals into humans from the psychology and the physiology of higher nervous activity's perspective. He develops a reinterpretation of Russian and foreign scholars associated with the schools of I. Pavlov (theory of the second signal system), A. Ukhtomsky (dominance theory), L. Vygotsky (model of child consciousness development), and A. Wallon. Porshnev also drew on the ideas of semantic paleontology by N. Ya. Marr.

A detailed examination of anthropogenesis within the context of evolutionary theory serves as the starting point for his arguments. The researcher primarily posited that humans could not have gradually emerged directly within the natural environment — the difference between animals and Homo sapiens is too vast. Porshnev asserted the existence of a "Cartesian abyss", a gap between hominids and Homo sapiens; this approach opposed evolutionary views that suggest the transition from animal to human was gradual. The author's main task was to explain the process of human emergence and resolve the fundamental antinomy: the irreducibility of social to biological, while simultaneously acknowledging that the origins of the social lie solely in the biological. Porshnev termed his field of study "paleopsychology".

== Main aspects ==
Building on Friedrich Engels' ideas, B. F. Porshnev identified "troglodytids" —upright primates "no longer animals, but not yet humans"— as pivotal to human origins. He excluded australopithecines, archanthropes, and paleoanthropes from true hominids, viewing even Cro-Magnons as incomplete humans. Central was troglodytids' hypersuggestibility, unique to them and absent in animals or modern humans, with brain size playing a secondary role.

Troglodytids scavenged brains and marrow from predator kills using primitive tools due to weak dentition; later tools enabled adelphophagy (intraspecies cannibalism). Fire was accidentally discovered during tool-making on plant bedding and eventually harnessed after initial resistance. Imitative tendencies drove speech via "signal displacement," linking signals to sensory analyzers. Proto-speech evolved from context-specific gestures to sign-based communication, foundational to abstract human language.

Late Tertiary ecological shifts forced larger groups, heightening hypersuggestibility risks and prompting interdictive signals (prohibitive commands via imitation). Territorial clashes developed protective inhibition, enabling suggestibility resistance. Per Porshnev, hominid interactions weakened hypersuggestibility through actions, gestures, and sounds, protecting against external influences. Speech emerged as a social mechanism—both means and expression of human relations—simultaneously with society formation. This produced humans with symbolic speech, reduced suggestibility (yet retaining adult imitation until cognitive maturity), and thinking initially reactive to interactions, not reflecting the material world.

Aphasias (speech disorders) reveal the early Homo sapiens second signal system. Second-signal interactions divide into interdictive/suggestive phases, aligning with Vygotsky's view of higher functions as internalized social relations. Suggestion internalizes relationships, enabling self-regulation via "addressing oneself"—the core unit of speech-thinking. Dyplastia (thinking's elementary contradiction) expresses primal "us-them" social dynamics.

=== Interaction of paleo- and neoanthropes ===
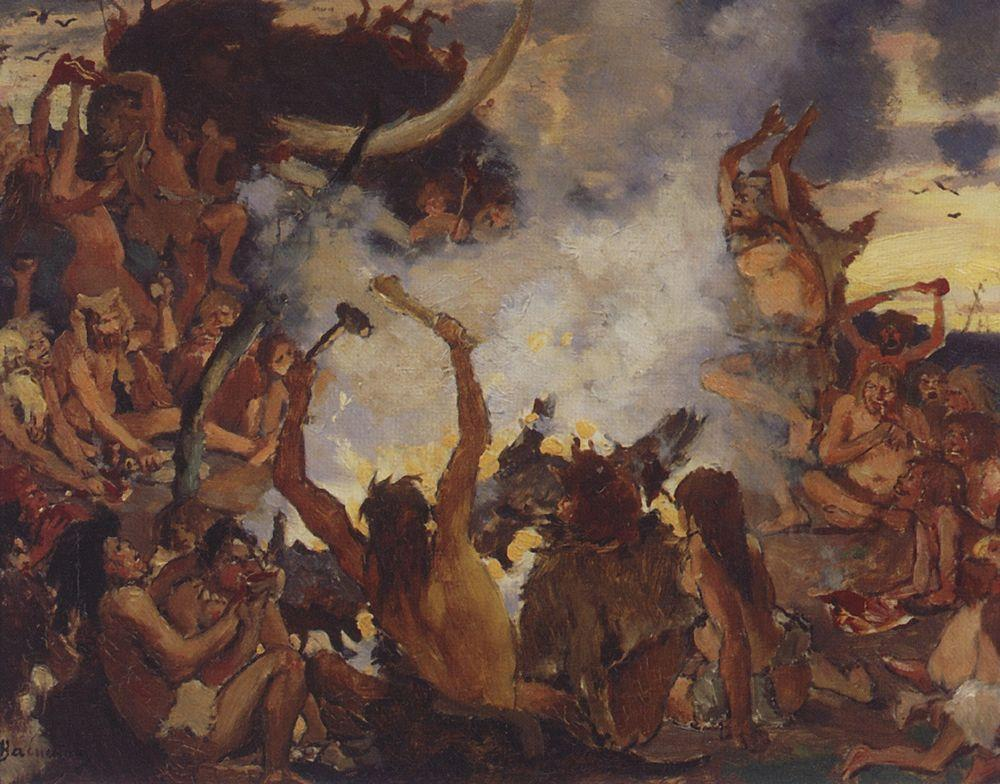
V. Vasnetsov. Stone Age. Feast. Sketch for a mural, 1883. Tretyakov Gallery

According to Porshnev, ancient humans and troglodytids in a shared environment led to the strengthening of inhibition and prohibition mechanisms — modern humans and Neanderthals coexisted within a single community, with individuals of the former species serving as the primary food source for troglodytes, that led to the establishment of human sacrifices and initiation rituals imitating death in human culture.

B. F. Porshnev theorized that gender relations among neoanthropes, including promiscuity, arose from the need to feed paleoanthropes by sacrificing part of their own population. Females produced many offspring, but a large share —likely males— was killed for this purpose. Surviving males formed isolated "provider" groups that "ransomed" neoanthrope young through hunting yields.

These biological value differences between male and female neoanthropes, combined with an induced killing instinct, fostered war as a exclusively male pursuit. Wars occurred only among neoanthrope groups, with a taboo against paleoanthropes. The hypothesis described constant separation of females and young from adult males due to hunting mobility demands, preventing reunions. Other males temporarily joined female groups during migrations. Neoanthropes lacked a fixed family structure, instead forming transient associations across groups.

Porshnev linked the emergence of cultural prohibitions (interdictions) to their inherent exceptions, rooted in the physiology of suggestion—a mechanism for inhibiting all but one action. This gave rise to human speech and cultural norms. Analyzing ancient prohibitions, he identified three main groups:

1. Prohibition on killing one's own kind: Stemming from the paleo-neoanthrope divergence, it initially barred eating humans killed by other humans (unlike those dying naturally), extending untouchability from the dead to the living via rituals like ochre smearing and decorations. Later, killing was restricted to ranged weapons, explaining primitive war rules where "rule-compliant" kills allowed consumption.
2. Prohibition on touching certain objects or actions: Reflected in Paleolithic art, which Porshnev saw as precursors to writing (echoing N. Ya. Marr), with images predating verbal thought. Earliest marks (lines, handprints) were traces of counter-suggestion. (Note: Quote:"These ancient images can be considered in the context of bypassing or compensating for the prohibition on touching. By closely examining the depicted objects, we see that they all fit a common meaning: 'That which cannot (or is impossible) to touch in reality.' These are female figurines representing the untouchable mother, where the face and ends of hands and feet were not of interest to the authors and are blurred; red and yellow ochre representing fire, which cannot be touched, and also representing blood, i.e., human life; predator teeth, primarily canines, depicting an animal's mouth, which cannot be touched…")
3. Sexual prohibitions: The oldest was the incest taboo (mother-son, then siblings), granting preferential rights to outsider males in the "shuffling herd." This sparked conflicts with resident young males, resolved by segregating the latter into separate groups with barriers, fostering exogamy.

According to Porshnev, early religious notions of "good" and "bad" deities also arose during the divergence — selection of neoanthropes among paleoanthropes. Images of deities (proto-deities) and various forms of "evil spirits" reflect the paleoanthrope, with whom modern humans had to interact for a long time, as well as specific features of this interaction. The more ancient these images, the more they contain literal physical traits and behavioral characteristics of the real "living" paleoanthrope.

=== Prolonged coexistence of paleo- and neoanthropes ===
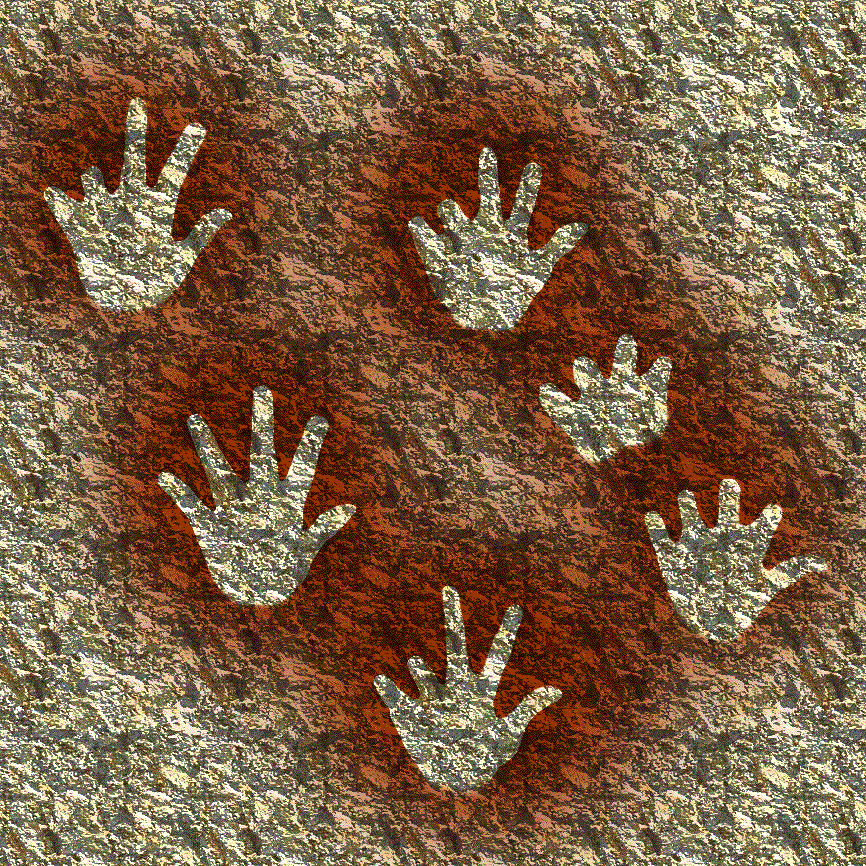
Troglodyte, throwing a stone. Carthaginian dish from the 7th century BCE

Neoanthrope divergence drove global expansion, as modern humans fled paleoanthropes that preyed on them or neoanthrope groups in symbiosis with Neanderthals. Porshnev attributed this dispersal to mutual intolerance among neoanthropes, not resource-seeking. Upon reaching remote regions like the Americas and Australia, populations overlapped, prompting returns to occupied lands. Divergence persisted through endogamy; today's races and ethnic groups extend this process, serving new adaptive roles.

According to Porshnev, paleoanthropes that survived their peak did not disappear entirely, as evidenced not only by mythology but also by historical sources. He believed there were numerous archaeological findings showing that Neanderthaloid creatures with their stone industry coexisted at the same sites as Cro-Magnons. Some paleoanthropes survived into the Neolithic and Bronze Age. Porshnev argued that accounts from ancient authors (Herodotus, Plutarch, Pomponius Mela, Pliny the Elder) about rare encounters with "satyrs" and "fauns" reflected the existence of paleoanthropes on the fringes of the known world at the time.

Porshnev paid particular attention to the representations in Zoroastrianism, which he viewed as an example of a source reflecting the memory of the ancient interaction between paleo- and neoanthropes. He suggested taking literally the information in the Avesta about daevas, considered by Zoroastrians as living beings. It is possible that as late as the 6th–5th centuries BCE, constant contact with relict paleoanthropes-daevas was maintained through the slaughter of large numbers of livestock for them and their taming by "sorcerers" (shamans). The Zoroastrian custom of leaving a deceased body to be torn apart by birds and beasts is also linked to ancient times, including as a means of feeding "their" paleoanthropes.

Porshnev considered the last representatives of relict paleoanthropes to be creatures described by naturalists of the 17th–18th centuries, including Nicolaes Tulp. Carl Linnaeus in the first edition of his System of Nature (1735, Leiden) also reserved a place for Homo troglodytes, described based on reports from Dutch naturalists.

== Theory's origin and development ==
At the time of writing On the Origin of Human History, B. F. Porshnev was internationally recognized as a specialist in 17th-century French history, (Note: His works were highly regarded by Fernand Braudel.) though in the USSR he was often seen as a dogmatic Marxist-Leninist or mocked for his yeti research. Porshnev described his interests in the following way:

For many years, I have heard caste-based reproaches: why am I dealing with this range of issues when my direct specialty is the history of 17th–18th century Europe? I take this opportunity to correct the misunderstanding: the science of the origin of human history—and, above all, paleopsychology—is my main specialty. If, in addition to this, I have devoted considerable time in my life to history, as well as philosophy, sociology, and political economy, this in no way discredits me in the aforementioned primary field of my research. But the questions of prehistory arise for me in aspects that my colleagues in related specialties do not study.

Porshnev dated the concept to the mid-1920s (or 1924 in drafts), envisioning a trilogy with On the Origin… as the middle volume, though archives show the plan solidified in the mid-1960s amid his publications on ancient humans. 1930s manuscripts outlined "primitive" behavior as alien to animal instincts or human consciousness, later framed in On the Origin… as "two inversions" transforming animal nature into history-making. He first presented publicly in 1956 at Moscow State University's Institute of Anthropology, building on physiology and psychology; influences included the 1952 Historia mundi review (with Vasily Struve) and Soviet World History (1955), contrasting European views with Friedrich Engels' theories.

In 1955, Teshik-Tash cave studies led Porshnev to conclude paleoanthropes scavenged leopard kills, sparking yeti hypotheses of relict Neanderthals; his 1958 USSR Academy commission bid failed, souring ties with anthropologists. A 1961–1962 report (published 1962 in Voprosy Filosofii) critiqued silos in biological, psychological, and socio-historical sciences. At the 1964 International Congress, he introduced a socio-psychological anthropogenesis emphasizing paleo- vs. neoanthropes and "us vs. them" origins. His 1966 Social Psychology and History and 1969 chapter explored human-troglodyte relations; 1967–1968 talks and a 1969 article revised Engels on labor, positing "suggestion" as the human-animal psychic divide, core to his trilogy.

Post-1968, Porshnev focused on the monograph. A 1970 Mysl contract for 27 sheets yielded a 35-sheet manuscript by year's end, requiring cuts; three chapters were removed before May 1972 typesetting. Reviewers struggled with the holistic concept. In September 1972, new editor V. P. Kopyrin chaired an Academy of Social Sciences discussion, contrasting Porshnev's views with Marxist classics, canceling publication and dismantling typeset. Porshnev died November 26, 1972. In 1973, proofs went to the USSR Academy's Institute of Psychology; supporter Lyudmila Antsyferova clashed with Kopyrin over anti-Marxism claims. A collective review by Khachik Momdzhyan and Sergei Tokarev became the preface; Kopyrin approved if Chapter 8 was revised. The book appeared in fall 1974.

== Reviews and critics ==
Historian G. Tihanov praised B. F. Porshnev for integrating history and paleopsychology, historicizing humankind's foundation in Soviet historiography. Despite adhering to Marxist materialism, Porshnev's concept of suggestion as a driver of history transcended dogma, presenting human history as a clash of suggestions and counter-suggestions rather than class struggle. Tihanov viewed Porshnev's work as a significant intellectual achievement amidst Soviet Marxism's decline.

The 1974 edition of Porshnev's On the Beginning of Human History included a review noting its unconventional views. Critics Kh. Momdzhyan, S. Tokarev, and L. Antsyferova appreciated Porshnev's method but cautioned against over-absolutizing ideas. A. A. Leontiev's 1975 review lauded the philosophical grounding of Porshnev's anthropogenesis but criticized his conflation of communication and speech, oversimplification of conscious purpose, and reliance on certain psychological concepts.

In 1980, Yakov Roginsky reviewed Porshnev's On the Beginning of Human History, focusing on its anthropological claims. He acknowledged Porshnev's engaging style but disputed his classification of early hominids as animals and his denial of their hunting practices, citing evidence of primate hunting. Roginsky also criticized Porshnev's redefinition of biological taxonomy and lack of focus on evolutionary morphology, though he praised his bold synthesis of diverse fields.

In foreign academic circles, Porshnev's theories (particularly on Neanderthal survival) were discussed in Current Anthropology between 1976 and 1979. I. Burtsev and D. Bayanov supported his ideas, while G. Strasenburg refuted claims of Neanderthal coexistence with humans, citing inconsistencies in historical evidence. A 1979 Slovak review of Porshnev's book mainly summarized its content without deep critique.

== Bibliography ==
- Antsyferova, L. I.; Momdzhyan, Kh. N.; Tokarev, S. A. (1974). "Preface". Porshnev B. F. O nachale chelovecheskoy istorii (problemy paleopsikhologii) [Porshnev B. F. On the Beginning of Human History (Problems of Paleopsychology)] (in Russian). Moscow: Mysl. pp. 5–12.
- Vite, O. T. (2005). "Boris Fedorovich Porshnev i ego kritika chelovecheskoy istorii" [Boris Fedorovich Porshnev and His Critique of Human History]. In Chudinov, A. V. (ed.). Frantsuzskiy ezhegodnik 2005: Absolyutizm vo Frantsii. K 100-letiyu B. F. Porshneva (1905–1972) [French Yearbook 2005: Absolutism in France. To the 100th Anniversary of B. F. Porshnev (1905–1972)] (in Russian). Moscow: Editorial URSS. pp. 4–36. ISBN 5-484-00334-2.
- Vite, O. (2007). "«Ya — schastlivyy chelovek»: Kniga «O nachale chelovecheskoy istorii» i eyo mesto v tvorcheskoy biografii B. F. Porshneva" [“I Am a Happy Person”: The Book “On the Beginning of Human History” and Its Place in B. F. Porshnev’s Creative Biography]. Porshnev B. F. O nachale chelovecheskoy istorii [Porshnev B. F. On the Beginning of Human History] (in Russian). St. Petersburg: Aleteyya. pp. 576–706. ISBN 978-5-903354-46-7.
- Glushchenko, V. V. (2020). Rozhdenie chelovechestva [The Birth of Humanity] (in Russian). St. Petersburg: Aleteyya. ISBN 978-5-00165-012-6.
- Eliseev, O. P. (2010). Praktikum po psikhologii lichnosti: [uchebnoe posobie dlya vuzov po napravleniyu i spetsialnosti «Sotsialnaya rabota»] [Practicum on Personality Psychology: [Textbook for Universities in the Field and Specialty of “Social Work”]] (in Russian). St. Petersburg: ID «Piter». ISBN 978-5-498-07456-6.
- Kutzenkov, P. A. (2007). Psikhologiya pervobytnogo i traditsionnogo iskusstva [Psychology of Primitive and Traditional Art] (in Russian). Moscow: Progress-Traditsiya. ISBN 978-5-89826-199-3.
- Kutzenkov, P. A. (2008). "Evolyutsionnaya patopsikhologiya (perelistyvaya knigu B. F. Porshneva «O nachale chelovecheskoy istorii»)" [Evolutionary Pathopsychology (Flipping Through B. F. Porshnev’s Book “On the Beginning of Human History”)]. Istoricheskaya psikhologiya i sotsiologiya istorii [Historical Psychology and Sociology of History] (in Russian). Vol. 1. pp. 180–197. ISSN 1994-6287.
- Leontiev, A. A. (1975). "O nachale chelovecheskoy istorii: razmyshleniya nad knigoy B. F. Porshneva" [On the Beginning of Human History: Reflections on B. F. Porshnev’s Book]. Sovetskaya etnografiya [Soviet Ethnography] (PDF) (in Russian). pp. 138–147.
- Porshnev, B. F.; Tokarev, S. A.; Momdzhyan, Kh. N.; Antsyferova, L. I. (1974). Dorogova, L. N.; Kadysheva, I. A. (eds.). O nachale chelovecheskoy istorii (problemy paleopsikhologii) [On the Beginning of Human History (Problems of Paleopsychology)]. Moscow: Mysl.
- Porshnev, B. F. (2007). Vite, O. T. (ed.). O nachale chelovecheskoy istorii (problemy paleopsikhologii) [On the Beginning of Human History (Problems of Paleopsychology)]. Mir kultury. St. Petersburg: Aleteyya. ISBN 978-5-903354-46-7.
- Roginsky, Ya. Ya. (1980). "O raznoglasiyakh v teorii antropogeneza" [On Disagreements in the Theory of Anthropogenesis]. Voprosy antropologii [Issues of Anthropology]. pp. 10–21.
- Rudyakov, A. N. (2012). Yazyk, ili Pochemu lyudi govoryat: opyt funktsionalnogo opredeleniya estestvennogo yazyka: ucheb. posobie [Language, or Why People Speak: An Attempt at a Functional Definition of Natural Language: Textbook]. Moscow: Flinta; Nauka. ISBN 978-5-9765-1400-3.
- Bayanov, D.; Bourtsev, I. (1976). "On Neanderthal vs. Paranthropus". Current Anthropology. Vol. 17. The University of Chicago Press, Wenner-Gren Foundation for Anthropological Research. pp. 312–318. doi:10.1086/201725. ISSN 0011-3204. JSTOR 2741548.
- Strasenburgh, G. (1979). "More on Neanderthal vs. Paranthropus". Current Anthropology. Vol. 20. The University of Chicago Press, Wenner-Gren Foundation for Anthropological Research. pp. 624–627. doi:10.1086/202353. ISSN 0011-3204. JSTOR 2742140.
- Švihran, J. (1979). "Poršnev, B. F.: O začiatkoch ľudských dejín (Preložila R. Kopsová.) 1. vyd. Bratislava, Pravda 1979. 465 s." [Poršnev, B. F.: On the Beginnings of Human History (Translated by R. Kopsová.) 1st ed. Bratislava, Pravda 1979. 465 pp.]. Jazykovedný časopis [Linguistic Journal] (PDF) (in Slovak). pp. 194–195.
- Tihanov, G. (2010). "Continuities in the Soviet period (chapter 14)". In Leatherbarrow, William; Offord, Derek (eds.). A History of Russian Thought (PDF). Cambridge, NY., etc.: Cambridge University Press. pp. 311–339. ISBN 978-0-521-87521-9.*

Vite, O. T. (2003). "Tvorcheskoe nasledie B. F. Porshneva i ego sovremennoe znachenie" [The Creative Legacy of B. F. Porshnev and Its Contemporary Significance]. Almanakh «Vostok» (in Russian).
