= Felsen =

Felsen is a surname. Notable people with the surname include:

- Hans-Jürgen Felsen (born 1940), German former sprinter
- Henry Felsen (1916–1995), American writer
- Leopold B. Felsen (1924–2005), German-born American physicist
- Martin Felsen (born 1968), American architect
- Vivian Felsen, Canadian translator and artist

== See also ==
- Felson, another surname
