= Pierre Birnbaum =

French historian and sociologist

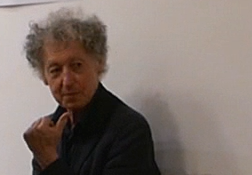
Pierre Birnbaum

Pierre Birnbaum (1940, Lourdes) is a French historian and sociologist.

== Biography ==
A graduate of the Sciences Po (class of 1962, Public Service track), Pierre Birnbaum defended his doctoral dissertation in Political science, titled “The Stratification of Power in the United States”, at the University of Paris in 1966.

His doctoral dissertation, defended in 1974 at Paris Descartes University under the supervision of François Bourricaud, is titled “The End of Politics”.

== Bibliography ==
- 1977: Les Sommets de l’État. Essai sur l'élite du pouvoir en France, Paris, Éditions du Seuil, ISBN 2-02-004642-3.
- 1979: Genèse du populisme; le peuple et les gros. Pluriel (in French). Paris: Pluriel. 2012. ISBN 978-2-8185-0225-9..
- 1982: La Logique de l’État, Fayard, 234 p. (series: "L’Espace du politique")
- 1983: The Sociology of the State, University of Chicago Press
- 1984: Dimensions du pouvoir, Presses Universitaires de France, 261 p. (series: "Sociologie d’aujourd’hui")
- 1988: Un mythe politique : la « République juive ». De Léon Blum à Mendès France, Fayard.
- 1992: Les Fous de la République. Histoire politique des Juifs d'État, de Gambetta à Vichy, Fayard, rééd. "Poche" Éditions du Seuil, 1994. ISBN 2-02-020505-X
- 1994: L’Affaire Dreyfus : La République en péril, coll. « Découvertes Gallimard » (nº 213), série Histoire. Paris: Gallimard.
- 1996: The Jews of the Republic: A Political History of State Jews in France from Gambetta to Vichy, Stanford University Press
- 1998: La France imaginée. Déclin des rêves unitaires ?, Fayard.
- 1998: Lévy, Clara (1999). Le moment antisémite; un tour de la France en 1898. Pluriel (in French). Vol. 40. Paris: Pluriel. pp. 783–785. doi:10.2307/3322866. ISBN 978-2-8185-0438-3. JSTOR 3322866..
- 2006: Arénilla, Louis (1993). La France aux Français; histoire des haines nationalistes. XXe (in French). Vol. 58. Paris: Éditions du Seuil. pp. 810–811. ISBN 2-02-085913-0..
- 2008: Un récit de « meurtre rituel » au Grand Siècle : l'affaire Raphaël Lévy, Metz, 1669, Fayard.
- 2010: Face au pouvoir, Éditions Galilée, ISBN 9782718608143.
- 2012: Les Deux Maisons. Les Juifs, l'État et les deux Républiques, Gallimard ISBN 978-2-07-012682-8.
- 2013: La République et le Cochon, Paris, le Seuil ISBN 978-2-02-110865-1.
- 2015: Sur un nouveau moment antisémite, Fayard, ISBN 978-2-213-68598-4.
- 2015: Les Désarrois d’un fou de l’État =: interviews with Jean Baumgarten and Yves Déloye, Albin Michel ISBN 978-2-226-31494-9.
- 2016: Léon Blum. Un portrait, Paris, le Seuil, ISBN 978-2-02-117426-7. - Prix du Livre d'histoire contemporaine - Quartier Latin.

== See also ==
- History of the Jews in France
- Antisemitism in 21st-century France
