= Stéphane Van Damme =

French historian

- In a 2023 interview
- Born: 1969 (age 56–57)
- Education: Panthéon-Sorbonne; EHESS
- Occupation: Historian
- Employer: École normale supérieure

Stéphane Van Damme (born 1969) is a French historian and Professor of Early Modern History at the École normale supérieure in Paris.

== Biography ==
Graduating from the university of Panthéon-Sorbonne and the EHESS, agrégé d’histoire, he received his PhD in 2000 under the supervision of Daniel Roche. After entering at the CNRS (Centre Alexandre Koyré) in 2001, he moved to Oxford at the Maison Française to take in charge the programme in history of science. In 2007, he was appointed by the University of Warwick as associate professor in Modern French History and director of its Eighteenth-Century studies center. In 2009, he moved to SciencesPo as associate professor in early modern history and history of science at the Centre d’histoire. He got his habilitation à diriger des recherches in 2010 at the EHESS under the guidance of Roger Chartier and became full professor at SciencesPo in 2011.

Since 2013, he has been Professor of the History of Science at the Department of History and European Civilization of the European University Institute based in Florence, Italy. In September 2020, he joined the Département d'Histoire at the École normale supérieure in Paris as Professor of Early Modern History and is running the Master programme in Transnational History. In June 2022, he created with Blaise Wilfert the Centre Interdisciplinaire d'études européennes at the Ecole Normale Supérieure.

== Research interests ==
Van Damme's research examines the relations between early modern scientific knowledge and European culture between 1650 and 1850 by looking at scientific centres (Lyon, Paris, London, Edinburgh, New York), founding fathers of the Scientific Revolution (Descartes), paradigmatic disciplines (philosophy, natural history, antiquarianism, geography), and recently, imperial projects (North America, French Asia).

In 2014, he published a collection of essays on cultural history of philosophy, A toutes voiles vers la vérité, which explored the role played by the (natural) philosopher in Old Regime European societies. It contrasts philosophe and philosopher in the two different spheres of activity: on the one hand the publicist and man of letters, and on the other the scientist, scholar and natural philosopher.

As editor of the Volume 1 of the Histoire des sciences et des savoirs, published in 2014, and A Global History of Linnean Science (Voltaire Foundation, 2018), he explored master narratives in the history of science and knowledge, both by displacing the historical chronology focussed on the "old regime of science” and by contrasting Early Modern Sciences with the modernist paradigm.

His second avenue of research deals with the urban history of science. After attempting a spatial history of Parisian sciences in Paris, capital philosophique (2005), he analyzed the relationships between modern sciences and metropolis by looking at the birth of urban archaeology as a discipline in Paris and London (in his book Metropoles de papiers, 2012). His recent publications includes a special issue of the journal History of Science, co-edited with William Carruthers on archaeology and material history of science. He edited with the art historian Charlotte Guichard the volume Antiquités dépaysées. Une histoire globale des cultures antiquaires au XVIIIe siècle (Liverpool, Liverpool University Press, 2022).

Taking into account the environmental crisis, his current project explores the emergence of a natural history of metropolises from the 17th century to the end of the 19th century when urban ecology started to split the field into different sectors of research (natural sciences and social and urban studies).

== Monographs ==
- Descartes : essai d'histoire culturelle d'une grandeur philosophique, Paris: Presses de Sciences Po, 2002.
- Paris, capitale philosophique : de la Fronde à la Révolution, Paris: O. Jacob, 2005.
- Le temple de la sagesse : savoirs, écriture et sociabilité ubrbaine, Lyon, XVIIe-XVIIe siècle., Paris: Éditions de l'École des hautes études en sciences sociales, 2005.
- L'épreuve libertine : morale, soupçon et pouvoirs dans la France baroque, Paris: CNRS Editions, 2008.
- Métropoles de papier : naissance de l'archéologie urbaine à Paris et à Londres, XVIIe-XXe siècle, Paris: Les Belles Lettres, 2012.
- A toutes voiles vers la vérité : une autre histoire de la philosophie au temps des Lumières, Paris: Éditions du Seuil, 2014.
- Sciences en société de la Renaissance à nos jours, Paris : La Documentation française, 2017.
- Dans l’absolu. De Louis XIII à Louis XIV - Histoire dessinée de la France T. 11 (bande dessinée), scenarist : Stéphane Van Damme, illustrator : Héloïse Chochois, Paris : La Revue dessinée / La Découverte, 2021
- La Prose des savoirs. Pragmatique des mondes intellectuels, Strasbourg, Presses universitaires de Strasbourg, 2020.
- Seconde Nature. Rematérialiser les sciences de Bacon à Tocqueville, Dijon, Presses du réel, 2020.
- Les Voyageurs du doute. L'invention d'un altermondialiste libertin (1620-1820), Paris, Fayard, 2023.
