= KEMA =

Dutch energy consultancy company

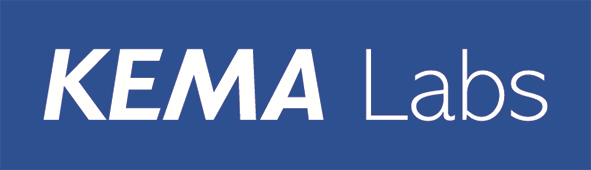
- Company type: Private
- Industry: Testing Inspection Certification
- Founded: 1927; 99 years ago
- Headquarters: Arnhem, Netherlands
- Area served: Global
- Key people: Domenico Villani, KEMA Labs Executive Vice President - Testing, Inspection and Certification Division
- Parent: CESI S.p.A.
- Website: https://www.cesi.it/testing-certification-inspection/

KEMA (Keuring van Elektrotechnische Materialen te Arnhem) NV, established in 1927, now KEMA Labs, is a global energy consultancy company headquartered in Arnhem, Netherlands. It offers management consulting, technology consulting & services to the energy value chain that include business and technical consultancy, operational support, measurements & inspection, and testing & certification services.

On 22 December 2011, DNV acquired 74.3% of KEMA's shares, creating a global consulting and certification company with 2300 experts located in over 20 countries.

On 12 September 2013, DNV and GL merged into DNV GL, becoming the world's leading ship and offshore classification society. As DNV GL the company continued to issue KEMA certificates from their laboratories.

On 30 December 2019, the property of KEMA B.V. has been transferred from DNV GL to CESI S.p.A. The acquisition includes all the high voltage testing, inspection and certification activities carried out at the KEMA owned laboratories in Arnhem (The Netherlands) and Prague (Czech Republic). The transaction was completed on 2 March 2020 with the acquisition of the Chalfont laboratory (USA).

The KEMA testing and inspections facilities include the world’s largest high-power laboratory, with the highest short circuit power of 10,000 MVA, and the world’s first laboratory capable of testing ultra-high voltage components for super grids, as well as the Flex Power Grid Laboratory, for advanced testing of smart grids components.

== History ==
KEMA was founded in 1927 as the Dutch electricity industry’s Arnhem-based test house, providing electrical safety testing and certification activities.

In the span of eighty years, The company is a risk management company actively providing independent applied research and consultancy services via an international network of subsidiaries and agencies.

On 22 December 2011, DNV acquired 74.3% of KEMA's shares, creating a global consulting and certification company within the cleaner energy, sustainability, power generation, transmission and distribution sectors.

On 12 September 2013, DNV and GL merged into DNV GL.

On 30 December 2019, the property of KEMA B.V. has been transferred from DNV GL to CESI S.p.A. The acquisition includes all the high voltage testing, inspection and certification activities carried out at the KEMA owned laboratories in Arnhem (The Netherlands) and Prague (Czech Republic). The transaction was completed on 2 March 2020 with the acquisition of the Chalfont laboratory (USA).
