= Giulia Sissa =

Italian classicist

Giulia Sissa (born 16 June 1954) is an Italian classical scholar and historian of philosophy. She is Distinguished Professor of Political Science and Classics at UCLA. The majority of her works deal specifically with the role of women in the Ancient Mediterranean.

== Life ==
Born in Mantua, Italy, Giulia Sissa graduated in Classics from the University of Pavia in 1977 before studying at the School for Advanced Studies in the Social Sciences in Paris, gaining the Diplôme d’Etudes Approfondies in 1979 and the Doctorat de IIIe cycle in 1983. She has been a researcher at the Laboratoire d’anthropologie sociale of Collège de France, and at the Centre National de la Recherche Scientifique in Paris. She has also been Professor of Classics and head of department at Johns Hopkins University.

== Works ==
- 'Il corpo della donna' [The woman's body], in Silvia Campese, Paola Manuli and Giluia Sissa (eds.) Madre materia: sociologia e biologia della donna greca. Turin: Boringhieri, 1983
- (with Marcel Detienne) The daily life of the Greek gods Stanford: Stanford University Press, 1989. Translated by Janet Lloyd from the French La vie quotidienne des dieux grecs (1987).
- Greek virginity. Cambridge, Mass.: Harvard University Press, 1990. Translated by Arthur Goldhammer from the French ''Le corps virginal: la virginité féminine en Grèce ancienne (1987).
- Le plaisir et le mal: philosophie de la drogue [Pleasure and evil: a philosophy of drugs]. Paris: O. Jacob, 1997
- L'âme est un corps de femme [The soul is a woman's body], 1999
- Sex and sensuality in the ancient world. New Haven and London: Yale University Press, 2008. Translated by George Staunton from the Italian Eros tiranno: sessualità e sensualità nel mondo antico (2003).
- Jealousy: a forbidden passion. Cambridge: Polity Press, 2015
- (ed. with Han van Ruler) Utopia 1516-2016: More's eccentric essay and its activist aftermath. Amsterdam: Amsterdam University Press, 2017.
