= Roland Mousnier =

French historian (1907-1993)

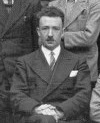
- Roland Mousnier, circa 1935
- Born: Roland Mousnier; 7 September 1907; Paris
- Died: 8 February 1993 (aged 85); Paris
- Education: École pratique des hautes études
- Occupation: Professor of History
- Years active: 1955-1977
- Employer: University of Paris
- Known for: Social historian
- Spouse: Jeanne Lecacheur

Roland Émile Mousnier (French: [ʁɔlɑ̃ emil munje]; Paris, September 7, 1907– February 8, 1993, Paris) was a French historian of the early modern period in France and of the comparative studies of different civilizations.

== Life ==
Mousnier was born in Paris and received his education at the École pratique des hautes études. Between 1932 and 1947, he worked as a school teacher in Rouen and Paris. During the Second World War, Mousnier was a member of the French Resistance. In 1947, he was appointed as a professor at Strasbourg University, before moving to the Sorbonne in 1955, where he remained until 1977. Keenly interested in social history, Mousnier went to the United States to learn sociology and anthropology. In 1934, Mousnier married Jeanne Lecacheur.

== Views ==
Mousnier was one of the few post-war French historians who was neither a member of the Annales School, or a subscriber to Marxist views of history. A right-wing Roman Catholic, Mousnier had a famous feud with the Soviet Marxist historian Boris Porchnev over whether peasant revolts in 17th-century France were a function of class struggle; he argued since the concept of class was largely unknown in that period, Porchnev was wrong to identify it as a driver. In Mousnier's view, social classes did not emerge as an important factor in French society until the 18th century, with the coming of a more market-oriented economy.

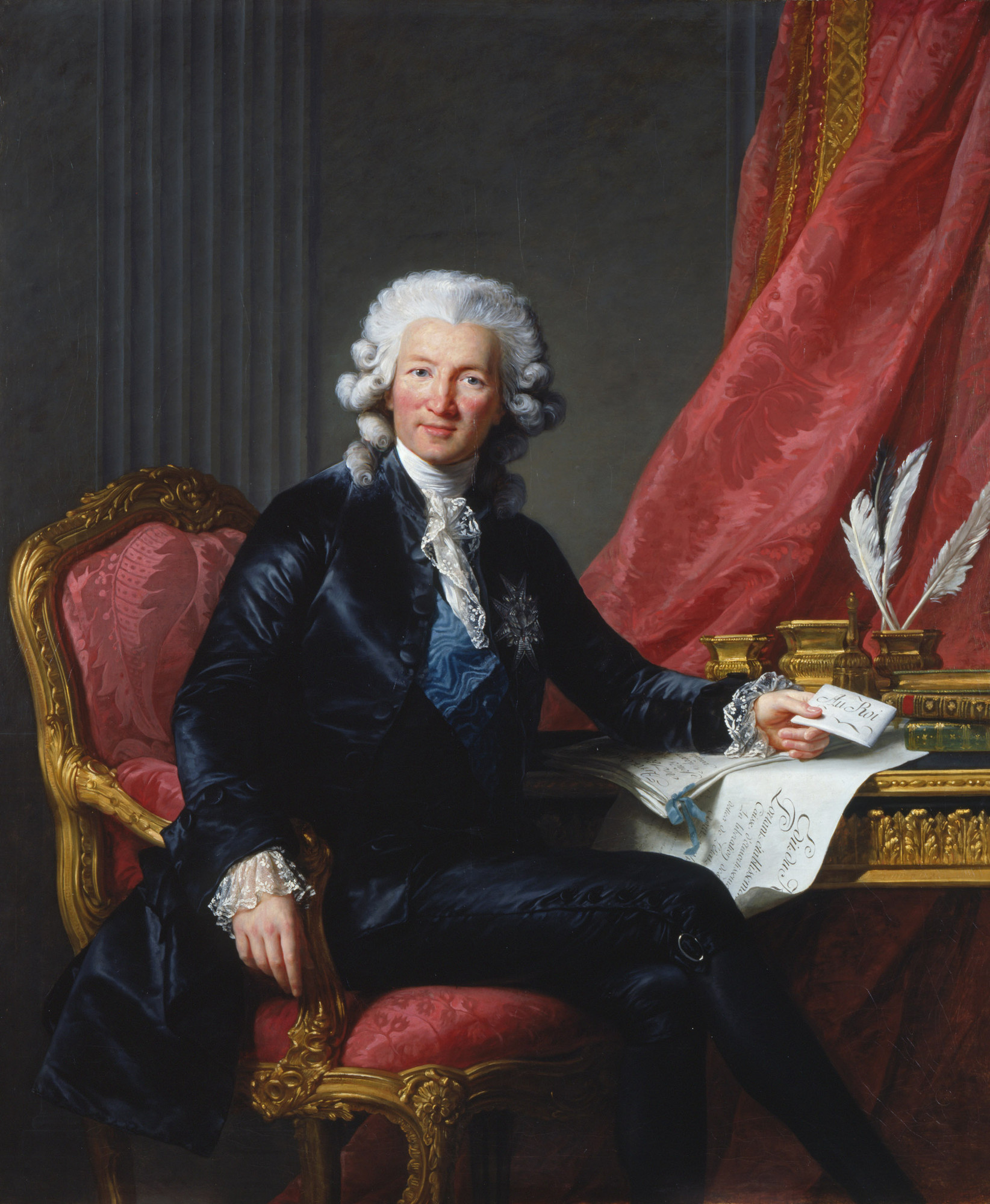
An official dressed as a Noblesse de robe

Mousnier's most notable claim to fame was his argument that early modern France was a "society of orders". In Mousnier's view, people in the period from the 15th century to the 18th century regarded honor, status and social prestige as far more important than wealth. As such, society was split vertically via social ranks rather than being split horizontally via class. Mousnier made it his life work to study how the relationships between different orders operated through networks of patronage. Mousnier referred to these relationships as maître-fidèle relations between those in the socially superior and those in the socially inferior orders. In general, Mousnier focused on elites in French society.

In his view, differences within the same order were more important than those between classes. Within the nobility, there were rigid divisions between the noblesse de robe, or Nobles of the robe, whose rank derived from holding judicial or administrative posts and were often hard-working professionals, unlike the aristocratic Noblesse d'épée or Nobles of the Sword.

One of his best known books, L'Assassinat d'Henri IV, or 'The Assassination of Henry IV' examined the climate of opinion and social context in 1610 France, in which a Catholic fanatic named François Ravaillac assassinated King Henry IV. Mousnier's conclusion was that there were numerous "potential Ravaillacs" in France who were looking for a chance to kill the King.

In 1964, he published the private papers of Pierre Séguier, who was Chancellor of France from 1635 to 1672. In 1969, he published Les Hiérarchies sociales , or Social Hierarchies, a study of the evolution of different civilizations such as Tibet, China, Germany, Russia and France; this was very critical of communist societies and those based on "technocratic orders".

== Honors and Awards ==
Officer of the Order of Legion of Honour

== Work ==
- La vénalité des offices sous Henri IV et Louis XIII, 1945 (2nd revised edition, 1971).
- Les règlements du Conseil du Roi sous Louis XIII, 1949.
- Le XVIIIe siècle: l'époque des "Lumières" (1715-1815) (with Ernest Labrousse and Marc Bouloiseau), 1953 (2nd revised edition, 1955), ISBN 9782130391517.
- Les XVIe et XVIIe siècles: la grande mutation intellectuelle de l'humanité: l'avènement de la science moderne et l'expansion de l'Europe, 1953 (1993).
- Les XVIe et XVIIe siècles: les progrès de la civilisation européenne et le déclin de l'orient (1492-1715), 1954.
- Progrès scientifique et technique au XVIIIe siècle, 1958.
- L'assassinat d'Henri IV: 14 mai 1610, 1964.
- Lettres et mémoires adressées au chancelier Séguier (1633–1649), 1964.
- Problèmes de stratification sociales : deux cahiers de la noblesse pour les États géneraux de 1649-1651 (with J.-P. Labatut and Y. Durandà), 1965.
- La participation des gouvernés à l'activité des gouvernants dans la France du XVIIe et du XVIIIe siècles, 1966. Social hierarchies: 1450 to the present
- Fureurs paysannes: les paysans dans les révoltes du XVIIe siècle (France, Russie, Chine), 1967.
- Les hiérarchies sociales de 1450 à nos jours, 1969 (translated as: Social hierarchies: 1450 to the present, 1973).
- "French Institutions and Society, 1610-1661" from The New Cambridge Modern History, Volume 4: The Decline of Spain and the Thirty Year's War edited by J.P. Cooper, 1970.
- La plume, la faucille et le marteau: institutions et société en France du Moyen âge à la Révolution, 1970.
- Les institutions de la France sous la monarchie absolue, 1598-1789, 2 volumes, 1974–1980.
- La famille, l'enfant et l'éducation en France et en Grande-Bretagne du XVIe au XVIIIe siècle, 1975.
- Recherches sur la stratification sociale à Paris aux XVIIe et XVIIIe siècles, 1976.
- Paris, capitale au temps de Richelieu et de Mazarin, 1978.
- La monarchie absolue en Europe: du Ve siècle à nos jours, 1982.
- "Les fidélités et les clientèles en France aux XVIe, XVIIe, et XVIIIe siècles", pages 35–46 from Histoire sociale, Volume 15, 1982.
- L'homme rouge, ou la vie du cardinal de Richelieu, 1582–1642, 1992.

== Legacy ==
The Centre Roland Mousnier (CRM) is one of France's oldest research centers in history, founded in 1958 by Roland Mousnier, Alphonse Dupront, and Victor-Lucien Tapié. The centre is housed in the historic building of the Sorbonne, located on Rue Victor Cousin in the 5th arrondissement of Paris. The center features a specialised library with a collection primarily focused on the history of Europe from the 15th to the 18th centuries. It operates under the supervision of Sorbonne University, CNRS, and the École Pratique des Hautes Études.

== Sources ==
- Hommage à Roland Mousnier: clientèles et fidélités en Europe à l'époque moderne, edited by Yves Durand, Paris: Presses Universitaires de France, 1981.
- Finley-Croswhite, Annette (1999). Boyd, Kelly (ed.). "Mousnier, Roland" in The Encyclopedia of Historians and Historical Writing, Volume 2. Routledge. ISBN 978-1884964336.
- Gasper, Julia (2013). The Marquis d'Argens: A Philosophical Life. Lexington. ISBN 978-0739182338.
- Hayden, J. Michael "Models, Mousnier, and Qualité: The Social Structure of Early Modern France", pages 375-398 from French History, Volume 10, 1996.
