= Laura Slatkin =

American classics teacher

Laura M. Slatkin

Academic background
- Education: Radcliffe College (BA); University of Cambridge (MA); Harvard University
- Thesis: Thetis, Achilles and the Iliad (1979)

Academic work
- Discipline: Classics
- Sub-discipline: Greek Literature
- Institutions: Gallatin School of Individualized Study, University of Chicago, Columbia University, Yale University, University of California, Santa Cruz

Laura M. Slatkin is an American Classics scholar, and Professor of Classical Studies at the Gallatin School of Individualized Study, New York University. She specializes in ancient Greek literature, with particular interests in gender studies, ancient wisdom, and Greek and Roman poetry.

== Early life and education ==
Laura Slatkin gained an interest in education from her father, a high school English teacher, at an early age. She studied for a BA in Greek at Radcliffe College, before moving to Cambridge University for an MA in Classics. Her PhD in Greek was completed at Harvard in 1979.

== Career ==
In 1976, she began teaching at University of California, Santa Cruz, becoming one of the first group of classicists working in the new department there, along with Gary Miles, Mary-Kay Gamel and John P. Lynch. She remained at UC Santa Cruz until 1980, when she became an assistant professor at Yale University for one year. In 1981 she took up a Mellon fellowship at Columbia University, before in 1983 becoming an assistant, then associate, professor at the same institution. Between 1993 and 2002 she was an associate professor at the University of Chicago, where she won a Quantrell Award in teaching in 1998. Since 2001 she has been a professor at the Gallatin School, New York University, where she is now a Distinguished Professor in Interdisciplinary Studies. She also remains a visiting professor at the University of Chicago.

Slatkin has secured additional fellowships and awards across her career, including an NEH Fellowship for University Teachers (1999), a fellowship at the Columbia University Institute for Scholars, Paris (2007), a Senior Fellowship at the Center for Hellenic Studies (2011-2016), and Global Research Initiative Fellowships in 2014 and 2015. She served as editor in chief for the journal Classical Philology between 1999 and 2001.

Slatkin is best known for her work in Greek Literature, with particular interests in gender studies, ancient wisdom, and Greek and Roman poetry; she has also written about her work teaching ancient Greek literature in the context of prison education. Her first book, The Power of Thetis (1992), was described by a reviewer as "sure to be influential" on studies of the Homeric poems, commenting that "Few readers of the Iliad will see Thetis in quite the same way after reading this book... the "power of Thetis" is also a metonym for the allusive potency of Homer's myths, and thus raises questions at the heart of Homeric studies". Another reviewer praised Slatkin's "reading the silences, the aural equivalent of the "spaces on the page," adding that the book was "both authoritative in its use of evidence and refreshingly speculative in its arguments" and that "the accumulation of suggestive evidence, the logical progression of her argument, and the consistency of her explanations coalesce into a book that has changed the way I read the Iliad. She brings me a bit closer to the range of associations that would have been swirling around and within and out of the Iliad in early Greece."

The Power of Thetis was described on its reissuing in 2011 as an "influential and widely admired book". Her work inspired the publication of a further volume on the goddess Thetis, published by De Gruyter in 2023. The book explicitly builds upon Slatkin’s work and functions as a companion volume to Slatkin's original work The Power of Thetis; in their introduction to the work, the editors describe The Power of Thetis as "seminal in revitalizing oralist and neo-analytic approaches to the study of the Homeric poems by showing that Homeric poetry, the Iliad in particular, not only moulds its story from and projects its plot against a wider mythological background, but also actively alludes to such a background, playing with traditions which its audience would have been able to recognize and appreciate." Both the original and this new volume were described by a reviewer as "key works of scholarship".

== Selected works ==
- 'Afterword to the Staying Power of Thetis', in Maciej Paprocki, Gary Patrick Vos, David John Wright, The staying power of Thetis: allusion, interaction, and reception from Homer to the 21st century. Trends in classics. Supplementary volumes, 140. Berlin; Boston: De Gruyter, 2023
- The Power of Thetis and selected Essays (Washington, D.C./Cambridge, MA: 2011)
- Histories of Post-War French Thought vol. 2, Antiquities: Rewriting the Past, Rethinking the Present, coeditors N. Loraux and G. Nagy. (New York: 2001)
- The Harper Collins World Reader, vol.1, "The Ancient Mediterranean World," co-editor D. Damrosch. (New York: 1993)
- The Power of Thetis: Allusion and Interpretation in the Iliad (Berkeley: 1992)
