= Nancy Felson =

American classical scholar

Nancy Felson is a Professor of Classics at the University of Georgia. She is the author of Regarding Penelope: From Character to Poetics (ISBN 978-0-8061-2961-7). She is the author of nearly three dozen scholarly articles discussing Greek and Latin literature.

== Education ==
Felson received a BA degree from the University of Cincinnati in 1964 with high honors, and an MA degree from Columbia University in 1965. Her Ph.D., also from Columbia, was based on the thesis Thematic Structure and Figures of Speech in Pindar. Complete CV at http://www.seltzerbooks.com/felson/cv.html

== Publications ==
- Regarding Penelope: From Character to Poetics in Homer's Odyssey, Princeton University Press (1994); paperback edition, University of Oklahoma Press (1997)
- Contextualizing Classics: Ideology, Performance, Dialogue (Rowman and Littlefield: 2000) (co-editor with Thomas Falkner and David Konstan)
- Semiotics and Classical Studies, Arethusa 16.1/2 (1983), 1-275 (guest-editor)
- Symbols in Ancient Greek Poetry and Myth, Classical World 74.2 (October 1980), 1-144 (guest-editor)
- The Poetics of Deixis in Alcman, Pindar, and Other Lyric, Arethusa 47.3 (2004), 253-472 (guest-editor)
- Links to selected articles by Nancy Felson http://www.seltzerbooks.com/felson/index.html
