= Bibliography of France =

France

This is a list of works which deal with France and its geography, history, inhabitants, and culture.

== General ==
- "France." in Europe, edited by Ferdie McDonald and Claire Marsden, Dorling Kindersley (Gale, 2010), pp. 144–217. Online.
- Carls, Alice-Catherine. "France." in World Press Encyclopedia, edited by Amanda C. Quick, (2nd ed., vol. 1, Gale, 2003), pp. 314–337. Online coverage of press and media.
- Chabal, Emile, France (Polity Press, 2020). Excerpt.
- Dephalese, Arnaud. France : Dictionnaire critique de civilisation contemporaine (Coneuwe, 2024. In French).
- Gildea, Robert. France Since 1945 (2nd ed. Oxford University Press, 2002).
- Goodliffe, Gabriel, and Riccardo Brizzi, eds. France After 2012 (Bergham, 2015).
- Haine, W. S. Culture and Customs of France (Greenwood Press, 2006).
- Kelly, Michael, ed. French Culture and Society: The Essentials (Oxford University Press, 2001).
- Raymond, Gino. Historical Dictionary of France (2nd ed. Scarecrow, 2008).
- Jones, Colin. Cambridge Illustrated History of France (Cambridge University Press, 1999).
- Ancient maps of France from the Eran Laor Cartographic Collection. National Library of Israel.

== History ==
=== Surveys and reference ===
- Esmein, Jean Paul Hippolyte Emmanuel Adhémar (1911). "France/History" . In Chisholm, Hugh (ed.). Encyclopædia Britannica. Vol. 10 (11th ed.). Cambridge University Press. pp. 801–929.
- Fenby, Jonathan (2016). France: A Modern History from the Revolution to the War with Terror.
- Fierro, Alfred (1998). Historical Dictionary of Paris (abridged translation of Histoire et dictionnaire de Paris ed.).
- Goubert, Pierre (1988). The Course of French History – via Questia. French textbook
- Guérard, Albert (1959). France: A Modern History. Textbook Publishers. ISBN 978-0-758120786.
- Haine, W. Scott (2000). The History of France. Greenwood Press. Archived from the original on 2008-05-17 – via Questia. textbook
- Jones, Colin; Ladurie, Emmanuel Le Roy (1999). The Cambridge Illustrated History of France. ISBN 978-0-521669924.
- Jones, Colin (2004). Paris: Biography of a City.
- McDonald, Ferdie; Marsden, Claire; Kindersley, Dorling, eds. (2010). France. Gale. pp. 144–217.
- McMillan, James F. (2009). Twentieth-Century France: Politics and Society in France 1898–1991.
- Popkin, Jeremy D. (2005). A History of Modern France.
- Price, Roger (1993). A Concise History of France.
- Raymond, Gino (2008). Historical Dictionary of France (2nd ed.).

=== Social, economic and cultural history ===
- Ariès, Philippe (1965). Centuries of Childhood: A Social History of Family Life.
- Beik, William (2009). A Social and Cultural History of Early Modern France.
- Cameron, Rondo (1961). France and the Economic Development of Europe, 1800–1914: Conquests of Peace and Seeds of War. economic and business history
- Caron, François (1979). An Economic History of Modern France. Archived from the original on 2013-05-27 – via Questia.
- Charle, Christophe (1994). A Social History of France in the 19th century.
- Clapham, H. G. (1921). Economic Development of France and Germany, 1824–1914.
- Clough, S. B. (1939). France, A History of National Economics, 1789–1939.
- Dormois, Jean-Pierre (2004). The French Economy in the Twentieth Century.
- Dunham, Arthur L. (1955). The Industrial Revolution in France, 1815–1848. Archived from the original on 2012-12-20 – via Questia.
- Hafter, Daryl M.; Kushner, Nina, eds. (2014). Women and Work in Eighteenth-Century France. Louisiana State University Press. Essays on female artists, "printer widows," women in manufacturing, women and contracts, and elite prostitution
- Hewitt, Nicholas, ed. (2003). The Cambridge Companion to Modern French Culture.
- Heywood, Colin (1995). The Development of the French Economy 1750–1914.
- McMillan, James F. (2000). France and Women 1789–1914: Gender, Society and Politics. Routledge.
- McPhee, Peter (2004). A Social History of France, 1789–1914 (2nd ed.).

=== Middle Ages ===
- Duby, Georges; Goldhammer, Arthur (2009) [1980]. The Three Orders: Feudal Society Imagined. New York: Barnes & Noble. ISBN 9781435107892. An examination of the social divisions in medieval France.
- Duby, Georges (1993). France in the Middle Ages 987–1460: From Hugh Capet to Joan of Arc. survey by a leader of the Annales School
- Bloch, Marc (1989). Feudal Society.
- Bloch, Marc (1972). French Rural History an Essay on Its Basic Characteristics.
- Le Roy Ladurie, Emmanuel (1978). Montaillou: Cathars and Catholics in a French Village, 1294–1324.
- Le Roy Ladurie, Emmanuel (1974) [1966]. The Peasants of Languedoc (English translation ed.).
- Murphy, Neil (2016). "Violence, Colonization and Henry VIII's Conquest of France, 1544–1546" (PDF). Past & Present (233): 13–51. doi:10.1093/pastj/gtw018.
- Potter, David (2003). France in the Later Middle Ages 1200–1500.

=== Early Modern ===
- Bergin, Joseph (1996). The Making of the French Episcopate 1589-1661. Yale University Press. ISBN 978-0-300-06751-4.
- Collins, James B. (1995). The state in early modern France. doi:10.1017/CBO9781139170147. ISBN 978-0-521382847.
- Davis, Natalie Zemon (1975). Society and culture in early modern France.
- Diefendorf, Barbara B. (2010). The Reformation and Wars of Religion in France: Oxford Bibliographies Online Research Guide. Oxford University Press, USA. ISBN 978-0-199809295. historiography
- Holt, Mack P. (2002). Renaissance and Reformation France: 1500–1648.
- Holt, Mack P., ed. (1991). Society and Institutions in Early Modern France.
- Potter, David (1995). A History of France, 1460–1560: The Emergence of a Nation-State.

=== Old Regime ===
- Doyle, William (2001). Old Regime France: 1648–1788.
- Doyle, William, ed. (2012). The Oxford Handbook of the Ancien Régime.
- Goubert, Pierre (1972). Louis XIV and Twenty Million Frenchmen. social history from Annales School
- Jones, Colin (2002). The Great Nation: France from Louis XV to Napoleon.
- Le Roy Ladurie, Emmanuel (1999). The Ancien Régime: A History of France 1610–1774. Wiley. ISBN 978-0-631211969. survey by leader of the Annales School
- Lynn, John A. (1999). The Wars of Louis XIV, 1667–1714.
- Roche, Daniel (1998). France in the Enlightenment. wide-ranging history 1700–1789
- Wolf, John B. (1968). Louis XIV. Archived from the original on 2012-04-20 – via Questia. biography

=== Enlightenment ===
- Baker, Keith Michael (1990). Inventing the French Revolution: Essays on French Political Culture in the Eighteenth Century.
- Blom, Philipp (2005). Enlightening the World: Encyclopédie, the Book That Changed the Course of History.
- Chisick, Harvey (2005). Historical Dictionary of the Enlightenment.
- Davidson, Ian (2010). Voltaire. A Life. Profile. ISBN 978-1-846682261.
- Delon, Michel (2001). Encyclopedia of the Enlightenment.
- Goodman, Dena (1994). The Republic of Letters: A Cultural History of the French Enlightenment. Cornell University Press. Archived from the original on 2008-10-07 – via Questia.
- Hazard, Paul (1965). European thought in the eighteenth century: From Montesquieu to Lessing.
- Kaiser, Thomas E. (Spring 1988). "This Strange Offspring of Philosophie: Recent Historiographical Problems in Relating the Enlightenment to the French Revolution". French Historical Studies. 15 (3): 549–562. doi:10.2307/286375. JSTOR 286375.
- Kors, Alan Charles (2003) [1990]. Encyclopedia of the Enlightenment (2nd ed.).
- Roche, Daniel (1998). France in the Enlightenment.
- Spencer, Samia I., ed. (1984). French Women and the Age of Enlightenment.
- Vovelle, Michel; Cochrane, Lydia G., eds. (1997). Enlightenment Portraits.
- Wilson, Arthur (1972). Diderot. Vol. II: The Appeal to Posterity. Oxford University Press. ISBN 0195015061.

=== Revolution ===
- Andress, David (1999). French Society in Revolution, 1789–1799.
- Doyle, William (1989). The Oxford History of the French Revolution. Oxford University Press. Archived from the original on 2012-05-13 – via Questia.
- Doyle, William (2001). The French Revolution: A Very Short Introduction. OUP Oxford. ISBN 978-0-19-157837-3. Archived from the original on 2012-04-29 – via Questia.
- Forrest, Alan (1981). The French Revolution and the Poor.
- Fremont-Barnes, Gregory, ed. (2006). The Encyclopedia of the French Revolutionary and Napoleonic Wars: A Political, Social, and Military History. ABC-CLIO.
- Frey, Linda S. and Marsha L. Frey (2004). The French Revolution. Greenwood Press. Archived from the original on 2012-05-13 – via Questia.
- Furet, François (1995). The French Revolution, 1770–1814 (also published as Revolutionary France 1770–1880). pp. 1–266. survey of political history
- Furet, François; Ozouf, Mona, eds. (1989). A Critical Dictionary of the French Revolution. history of ideas
- Hampson, Norman (2006). Social History of the French Revolution.
- Hanson, Paul R. (2015). Historical dictionary of the French Revolution.
- Hardman, John (2016) [1994]. Louis XVI: The Silent King (2nd ed.). biography
- Hardman, John (1995). French Politics, 1774–1789: From the Accession of Louis XVI to the Fall of the Bastille.
- Jones, Colin (1989). The Longman Companion to the French Revolution.
- Jones, Colin (2002). The Great Nation: France from Louis XV to Napoleon.
- Jones, Peter (1988). The Peasantry in the French Revolution.
- Lefebvre, Georges (1962). The French Revolution. ISBN 978-0-231025195.
- Lucas, Colin, ed. (1988). The Political Culture of the French Revolution.
- Montague, Francis Charles; Holland, Arthur William (1911). "French Revolution, The" . In Chisholm, Hugh (ed.). Encyclopædia Britannica. Vol. 11 (11th ed.). Cambridge University Press. pp. 154–171.
- Neely, Sylvia (2008). A Concise History of the French Revolution.
- Paxton, John (1987). Companion to the French Revolution. hundreds of short entries
- Schwab, Gail M.; Jeanneney, John R., eds. (1995). The French Revolution of 1789 and Its Impact. Archived from the original on 2012-05-13 – via Questia.
- Scott, Samuel F. and Barry Rothaus (1984). Historical Dictionary of the French Revolution, 1789–1799. short essays by scholars
- Schama, Simon (1989). Citizens. A Chronicle of the French Revolution. narrative
- Sutherland, D. M. G. (2003). France 1789–1815. Revolution and Counter-Revolution (2nd ed.).

==== Long-term impact ====
- Berenson, Edward; Duclert, Vincent, eds. (2011). The French Republic: History, Values, Debates. 38 short essays by leading scholars on the political values of the French Republic
- Englund, Steven (1992). "Church and state in France since the Revolution". Journal of Church & State. 34 (2): 325–361. doi:10.1093/jcs/34.2.325.
- Furet, François (1995). Revolutionary France 1770–1880.
- Gildea, Robert (1994). The Past in French History.
- Harison, Casey. (2002). "Teaching the French Revolution: Lessons and Imagery from Nineteenth and Twentieth Century Textbooks". History Teacher. 35 (2): 137–162. doi:10.2307/3054175. JSTOR 3054175.
- O'Rourke, Kevin H. (2006). "The Worldwide Economic Impact of the French Revolutionary and Napoleonic Wars, 1793–1815". Journal of Global History. 1 (1): 123–149. doi:10.1017/S1740022806000076.
- Palmer, Robert R. (1959). The Age of the Democratic Revolution: A Political History of Europe and America, 1760–1800. Vol. 1. Archived from the original on 2012-05-13 – via Questia. comparative history
- Shusterman, Noah (2013). The French Revolution Faith, Desire, and Politics. Routledge. ISBN 978-1-134456000.
- Stromberg, Roland N. (1986). "Reevaluating the French Revolution". History Teacher. 20 (1): 87–107. doi:10.2307/493178. JSTOR 493178.

=== Napoleon ===
- Bergeron, Louis (1981). France Under Napoleon. Princeton University Press. ISBN 978-0691007892.
- Emsley, Clive. Napoleon 2003. succinct coverage of life, France and empire; little on warfare
- Englund, Steven (2004). Napoleon: A Political Life. political biography
- Fisher, Herbert (1913). Napoleon.
- Fremont-Barnes, Gregory, ed. (2006). The Encyclopedia of the French Revolutionary and Napoleonic Wars: A Political, Social, and Military History. ABC-CLIO.
- Grab, Alexander (2003). Napoleon and the Transformation of Europe. Bloomsbury. ISBN 978-1-403937575. maps and synthesis
- Harold, J. Christopher (1963). The Age of Napoleon. popular history stressing empire and diplomacy
- Lefebvre, Georges (1969) [1936]. Napoleon: From Tilsit to Waterloo, 1807–1815. Routledge & K. Paul. ISBN 978-0-710080141.
- Markham, Felix. Napoleon 1963. Archived from the original on 2012-10-18 – via Questia.
- McLynn, Frank (2003). Napoleon: A Biography. stress on military
- Messenger, Charles, ed. (2013). Reader's Guide to Military History. Routledge. pp. 391–427. ISBN 978-1-135959708. evaluation of major books on Napoleon & his wars
- Nafziger, George F. (2002). Historical Dictionary of the Napoleonic Era.
- Nicholls, David (1999). Napoleon: A Biographical Companion.
- Richardson, Hubert N. B. (1920). A Dictionary of Napoleon and His Times.
- Roberts, Andrew (2014). Napoleon: A Life. Viking. pp. 662–712. ISBN 978-0-670025329. biography
- Thompson, J. M. (1954). Napoleon Bonaparte: His Rise and Fall.
- Tulard, Jean (1984). Napoleon: The Myth of the Saviour.

=== Restoration: 1815–1870 ===
- Agulhon, Maurice (1983). The Republican Experiment, 1848–1852. Cambridge University Press. ISBN 978-0-521289887.
- Artz, Frederick (1931). France Under the Bourbon Restoration, 1814–1830. Harvard University Press.
- Campbell, Stuart L. (1978). The Second Empire Revisited: A Study in French Historiography.
- Charle, Christophe (1994). A Social History of France in the Nineteenth Century.
- Echard, William E. (1985). Historical Dictionary of the French Second Empire, 1852–1870. Archived from the original on 2011-06-28 – via Questia.
- Fortescue, William (1988). Revolution and Counter-revolution in France, 1815–1852. Blackwell.
- Furet, François (1995). Revolutionary France 1770-1880. pp. 326–384. Survey of political history
- Gildea, Robert (2008). Children of the Revolution: The French, 1799–1914.
- Jardin, André, and Andre-Jean Tudesq (1988). Restoration and Reaction 1815–1848.
- Plessis, Alain (1988). The Rise and Fall of the Second Empire, 1852–1871.
- Spitzer, Alan B. (1962). "The Good Napoleon III". French Historical Studies. 2 (3): 308–329. doi:10.2307/285884. JSTOR 285884. historiography
- Strauss-Schom, Alan (2018). The Shadow Emperor: A Biography of Napoleon III.
- Wolf, John B. (1940). France: 1815 to the Present. PRENTICE - HALL.

=== Third Republic: 1871–1940 ===
- Bell, David Scott; et al., eds. (1990). Biographical Dictionary of French Political Leaders Since 1870.
- Bernard, Philippe, and Henri Dubief (1988). The Decline of the Third Republic, 1914–1938. The Cambridge History of Modern France).
- Bury, John Patrick Tuer (1949). France, 1814–1940. University of Pennsylvania Press. Chapters 9–16.
- Kedward, Rod (2007). France and the French: A Modern History. pp. 1–245.
- Lehning, James R. (2001). To Be a Citizen: The Political Culture of the Early French Third Republic. Archived from the original on 2011-06-28 – via Questia.
- McMillan, James F. (1992). Twentieth-Century France: Politics and Society in France 1898–1991.
- Mayeur, Jean-Marie; Rebérioux, Madeleine (1984). The Third Republic from its Origins to the Great War, 1871–1914. Cambridge University Press. ISBN 978-2-73-510067-5.
- Price, Roger (1987). A Social History of Nineteenth-Century France. Holmes & Meier. Archived from the original on 2011-06-28 – via Questia.
- Robb, Graham (2007). The Discovery of France: A Historical Geography, from the Revolution to the First World War.
- Shirer, William L. (1969). The Collapse of the Third Republic. New York: Simon & Schuster.
- Sowerwine, Charles (2009). France since 1870: Culture, Society and the Making of the Republic.
- Tombs, Robert (2014). France 1814–1914. Routledge. ISBN 978-1-317871439.
- Weber, Eugen (1976). Peasants into Frenchmen: The Modernization of Rural France, 1870–1914. Stanford University Press. ISBN 978-0-80-471013-8.
- Wolf, John B. (1940). France: 1815 to the Present. PRENTICE - HALL. pp. 349–501.
- Zeldin, Theodore (1979). France, 1848–1945. topical approach

==== World War I ====
- Cabanes Bruno (2016). August 1914: France, the Great War, and a Month That Changed the World Forever. argues that the extremely high casualty rate in very first month of fighting permanently transformed France
- Greenhalgh, Elizabeth (2005). Victory through Coalition: Britain and France during the First World War. Cambridge University Press.
- Tucker, Spencer, ed. (1999). European Powers in the First World War: An Encyclopedia.
- Winter, J. M. (1999). Capital Cities at War: Paris, London, Berlin, 1914–1919.

==== Vichy (1940–1944) ====
- Azema, Jean-Pierre (1985). From Munich to Liberation 1938–1944. The Cambridge History of Modern France).
- Berthon, Simon (2001). Allies at War: The Bitter Rivalry among Churchill, Roosevelt, and de Gaulle.
- Gildea, Robert (2004). Marianne in Chains: Daily Life in the Heart of France During the German Occupation.
- Kersaudy, Francois (1990). Churchill and De Gaulle (2nd ed.).
- Lacouture, Jean (1991) [1984]. De Gaulle: The Rebel 1890–1944 (English ed.).

=== Fourth and Fifth Republics (1944 to present) ===
- Bell, David Scott; et al., eds. (1990). Biographical Dictionary of French Political Leaders Since 1870.
- Berstein, Serge, and Peter Morris (2006). The Republic of de Gaulle 1958–1969 (The Cambridge History of Modern France).
- Berstein, Serge, Jean-Pierre Rioux, and Christopher Woodall (2000). The Pompidou Years, 1969–1974. The Cambridge History of Modern France).
- Bourg, Julian, ed. (2004). After the Deluge: New Perspectives on the Intellectual and Cultural History of Postwar France. Lexington Books. ISBN 978-0-7391-0792-8.
- Cerny, Philip G. (1980). The Politics of Grandeur: Ideological Aspects of de Gaulle's Foreign Policy.
- Chabal, Emile, ed. (2015). France since the 1970s: History, Politics and Memory in an Age of Uncertainty. Excerpt.
- Fenby, Jonathan (2010). The General: Charles de Gaulle and the France He Saved.
- Goodliffe, Gabriel; Brizzi, Riccardo (eds.). France After 2012. Berghahn Books, 2015.
- Hauss, Charles (1991). Politics in Gaullist France: Coping with Chaos. Archived from the original on 2011-06-28 – via Questia.
- Kedward, Rod (2007). France and the French: A Modern History. pp. 310–648.
- Kolodziej, Edward A. (1974). French International Policy under de Gaulle and Pompidou: The Politics of Grandeur. Archived from the original on 2011-06-28 – via Questia.
- Lacouture, Jean (1993). De Gaulle: The Ruler 1945–1970.
- McMillan, James F. (1992). Twentieth-Century France: Politics and Society in France 1898–1991.
- Northcutt, Wayne (1992). Historical Dictionary of the French Fourth and Fifth Republics, 1946–1991.
- Rioux, Jean-Pierre, and Godfrey Rogers (1989). The Fourth Republic, 1944–1958. The Cambridge History of Modern France.
- Sowerwine, Charles (2009). France since 1870: Culture, Society and the Making of the Republic.
- Williams, Charles (1997). The Last Great Frenchman: A Life of General De Gaulle.
- Williams, Philip M. and Martin Harrison (1965). De Gaulle's Republic. Archived from the original on 2011-06-28 – via Questia.

=== Historiography ===
- Daileader, Philip; Whalen, Philip, eds. (2010). French Historians 1900–2000: New Historical Writing in Twentieth-Century France. John Wiley & Sons. ISBN 978-1-444323665.
- Gildea, Robert (1994). The Past in French History. Yale University Press. ISBN 978-0-300067118.
- Kritzman, Lawrence D.; Nora, Pierre, eds. (1996). Realms of Memory: Rethinking the French Past. Columbia University Press. ISBN 978-0-231106344. essays by scholars
- Pinkney, David H. (1951). "Two Thousand Years of Paris". Journal of Modern History. 23 (3): 262–264. doi:10.1086/237432. JSTOR 1872710. S2CID 143402436.
- Offen, Karen (2003). "French Women's History: Retrospect (1789–1940) and Prospect". French Historical Studies. 26 (4): 757+. doi:10.1215/00161071-26-4-727. S2CID 161755361.
- Revel, Jacques; Hunt, Lynn, eds. (1995). Histories: French Constructions of the Past. New Press. ISBN 978-1-565841956. 64 essays; emphasis on Annales School
- Symes, Carol (Winter 2011). "The Middle Ages between Nationalism and Colonialism". French Historical Studies. 34 (1): 37–46. doi:10.1215/00161071-2010-021.
- Thébaud, Françoise (2007). "Writing Women's and Gender History in France: A National Narrative?". Journal of Women's History. Project MUSE. 19 (1): 167–172. doi:10.1353/jowh.2007.0026. S2CID 145711786.

=== Primary sources ===
- Anderson, F.M. (1904). The constitutions and other select documents illustrative of the history of France, 1789–1901. Unspecified. ISBN 978-0-59-886790-2.

=== Scholarly journals ===
- French Historical Studies
- French History (journal)
- Le Mouvement social

== Politics ==
- General government web site with all texts, including some that are translated to English
- Constitution ed la République Française
  - original text
  - official English translation
  - Declaration of the Rights of Man and of the Citizen (French text, English translation)
- Civil Code, statutory part
  - Code of Civil Procedure, statutory part (official English translation)
  - Criminal Code, statutory part official English translation)
  - Code of Criminal Procedure, statutory part (official English translation)
  - Code of Administrative Justice, statutory part
- Vie publique : découverte des institutions
- Les pouvoirs publics. Textes essentiels 2005., La Documentation française, ISBN 2-11-005961-3
- La Cour des Comptes, The Court of Accounts (in English)
- Alain Lambert, Didier Migaud, Réussir la LOLF, clé d'une gestion publique responsible et efficace. Rapport au Gouvernement, September 2005, ISBN 2-11-095515-5 (page, PDF)
  - Presentation of the LOLF
- Edward Arkwright, Stanislas Godefroy, Manuel Mazquez, Jean-Luc Bœuf, Cécile Courrèges, La mise en oeuvre de la loi organique relative aux lois de finances, La Documentation Française, 2005, ISBN 2-11-005944-3
- Conseil d'État, rapport public 2001, Les autorités administratives indépendantes (PDF) ISBN 2-11-004788-7
- Frédéric Monera, L'idée de République et la jurisprudence du Conseil constitutionnel – Paris: L.G.D.J., 2004 -

== Foreign relations ==
- Aldrich, Robert, and John Connell. France and World Politics (Routledge 1989)
- Bell, P.M.H. France and Britain, 1940–1994: The Long Separation (1997)
- Berstein, Serge, Jean-Pierre Rioux, and Christopher Woodall. The Pompidou Years, 1969–1974 (The Cambridge History of Modern France) (2000) excerpt and text search
- Berstein, Serge, and Peter Morris. The Republic of de Gaulle 1958–1969 (The Cambridge History of Modern France) (2006) excerpt and text search
- Bozo, Frédéric. "'Winners' and 'Losers': France, the United States, and the End of the Cold War", Diplomatic History Nov. 2009, Volume 33, Issue 5, pages 927–956, doi:10.1111/j.1467-7709.2009.00818.x
- Bozo, Frédéric. French Foreign Policy since 1945: An Introduction (Berghahn Books, 2016).
- Cerny, Philip G. The Politics of Grandeur: Ideological Aspects of de Gaulle's Foreign Policy. (1980). 319 pp.
- Chassaigne, Phillipe, and Michael Dockrill, eds. Anglo-French Relations 1898–1998: From Fashoda to Jospin (2002)
- Chipman, John. French Power in Africa (Blackwell, 1989)
- Cogan, Charles G. Oldest Allies, Guarded Friends: The United States and France since 1940 (Greenwood, 1994)
- Cole, Alistair. Franco-German Relations (2000).
- Costigliola, Frank. France and the United States: The Cold Alliance since World War II (1992)
- Fenby, Jonathan. The General: Charles De Gaulle and the France he saved (2010).
- Feske, Victor H. "The Road To Suez: The British Foreign Office and the Quai D’Orsay, 1951–1957" in The Diplomats, 1939-1979 (2019) pp. 167–200; online
- Johnson, Douglas, et al. Britain and France: Ten Centuries (1980) table of contents
- Keiger, J.F.V. France and the World since 1870 (2001); 261pp; topical approach emphasizing national security, intelligence & relations with major powers
- Krotz, Ulrich. "Three eras and possible futures: a long-term view on the Franco-German relationship a century after the First World War." International Affairs (2014) 20#2 pp 337–350.
- Lane, Philippe. French scientific and cultural diplomacy (2013) online
- Lequesne, Christian. "French foreign and security challenges after the Paris terrorist attacks." Contemporary security policy 37.2 (2016): 306–318.
- Moravcsik, Andrew et al. "De Gaulle Between Grain and Grandeur: The Political Economy of French EC Policy, 1958–1970" Journal of Cold War Studies. (2000) 2#2 pp 3–43; 2#3 pp 4–142.; two part article plus critics plus rejoinder
- Moravcsik, Andrew. "Charles de Gaulle and Europe: The New Revisionism." Journal of Cold War Studies (2012) 14#1 pp: 53–77.
- Nuenlist, Christian, Anna Locher, and Garret Martin, eds. Globalizing de Gaulle: International Perspectives on French Foreign Policies, 1958 to 1969 (Rowman & Littlefield, 2010)
- Paxton, Robert O., ed. De Gaulle and the United States (1994)
- Soutou, Georges-Henri. "France and the Cold War, 1944-63." Diplomacy & Statecraft. (2001) 12#4 pp 3–52.
- Sharp, Alan, and Glyn Stone, eds. Anglo-French Relations in the Twentieth Century: Rivalry and Cooperation (2000) excerpt and text search
- Simonian, Haig. The Privileged Partnership: Franco-German Relations in the European Community 1969–1984 (1985)
- Tombs, Robert and Isabelle Tombs. That Sweet Enemy: Britain and France: The History of a Love-Hate Relationship (2008) 1688 to present online
- Williams, Philip M. and Martin Harrison. De Gaulle's Republic (1965) online

== Tourism ==
- Bauer, Michel. "Cultural tourism in France." in Cultural tourism in Europe (1996): 147–164.
- Cawley, Mary, Jean-Bernard Marsat, and Desmond A. Gillmor. "Promoting integrated rural tourism: comparative perspectives on institutional networking in France and Ireland." Tourism Geographies 9.4 (2007): 405–420.
- Clarke, Alan. "Coastal development in France: Tourism as a tool for regional development." Annals of Tourism Research 8.3 (1981): 447–461.
- Corne, Aurélie. "Benchmarking and tourism efficiency in France." Tourism Management 51 (2015): 91–95.
- Cró, Susana, and António Miguel Martins. "Foreign Direct Investment in the tourism sector: The case of France." Tourism Management Perspectives 33 (2020): 100614. online
- d'Hauteserre, Anne-Marie. "The role of the French state: Shifting from supporting large tourism projects like Disneyland Paris to a diffusely forceful presence." Current Issues in Tourism 4.2-4 (2001): 121–150. online
- Eade, John. "Pilgrimage and tourism at Lourdes, France." Annals of Tourism Research 19.1 (1992): 18-32 online.
- Endy, Christopher. Cold war holidays: American tourism in France (U of North Carolina Press, 2004).
- Frochot, Isabelle. "Wine tourism in France: a paradox?." in Wine tourism around the world (2009): 67–80.
- Furlough, Ellen. "Making mass vacations: tourism and consumer culture in France, 1930s to 1970s." Comparative Studies in Society and History 40.2 (1998): 247-286 online.
- Gay, Jean-Christophe. "Why is tourism doing poorly in overseas France?" Annals of Tourism Research 39.3 (2012): 1634–1652. online
- Gordon, Bertram M. War Tourism. Second World War France from Defeat and Occupation to the Creation of Heritage (Cornell UP, 2018. ISBN) online review
- Harp, Stephen L. Au naturel: Naturism, nudism, and tourism in twentieth-century France (LSU Press, 2014).
- Lamont, Matthew, and Jim McKay. "Intimations of postmodernity in sports tourism at the Tour de France." Journal of Sport & Tourism 17.4 (2012): 313–331.
- Pickel-Chevalier, Sylvine. "Can equestrian tourism be a solution for sustainable tourism development in France?." Loisir et Société/Society and Leisure 38.1 (2015): 110–134. online
- Seraphin, Hugues, et al. "Tourism education in France and sustainable development goal 4 (quality education)." Worldwide Hospitality and Tourism Themes (2021).
- Seraphin, Hugues. "Terrorism and tourism in France: the limitations of dark tourism." Worldwide Hospitality and Tourism Themes 9.2 (2017): 187–195. online
- Young, Patrick. Enacting Brittany: Tourism and culture in provincial France, 1871–1939 (Routledge, 2017).

== Demographics ==
- Diebolt, Claude, and Perrin Faustine. Understanding Demographic Transitions. An Overview of French Historical Statistics (Springer, 2016) 176 pages. table of contents
- Dyer, Colin L. Population and Society in 20th Century France (1978)
- Henry, Louis. "The population of France in the eighteenth century." in Population in History (1965). pp 441+
- Spengler, Joseph J. France Faces Depopulation (1938)
- Van de Walle, Etienne. The female population of France in the nineteenth century: a reconstruction of 82 départements (Princeton University Press, 1974)

== Religion ==
- Aston, Nigel. (2000) Religion and Revolution in France, 1780–1804
- Bowen, John Richard. (2007) Why the French don't like headscarves: Islam, the state, and public space (Princeton UP)
- Curtis, Sarah A. (2000) Educating the Faithful: Religion, Schooling, and Society in Nineteenth-Century France (Northern Illinois UP)
- Edelstein, D. (2009). The Terror of Natural Right: Republicanism, the Cult of Nature, and the French Revolution. Chicago: University of Chicago Press.
- Furet, F. (1981) Interpreting the French Revolution. Cambridge UP.
- Gibson, Ralph. (1989) A Social History of French Catholicism, 1789-1914 London: Routledge.
- Hunt, L. (1984). Politics, culture, and class in the French Revolution. Berkeley: University of California Press.
- Hussey, Andrew. (2014) The French Intifada: The Long War Between France and its Arabs London: Granta.
- Israel, J. (2014). Revolutionary Ideas: An Intellectual History of the French Revolution from The Rights of Man to Robespierre. Princeton University Press.
- Latourette, Kenneth Scott. (1969) Christianity in a Revolutionary Age: Volume I: The Nineteenth Century in Europe: Background and the Roman Catholic Phase online passim on Catholics in France.
- Latourette, Kenneth Scott. (1959) Christianity in a Revolutionary Age: Vol II: The Nineteenth Century in Europe: The Protestant and Eastern Churches; pp 224–34 on Protestants in France.
- Latourette, Kenneth Scott. (1959) Christianity in a Revolutionary Age: Vol IV: The Twentieth Century in Europe: The Roman Catholic, Protestant, and Eastern Churches pp 128–53 on Catholics in France; pp 375–79 on Protestants.
- McMillan, James. (2014) "Catholic Christianity in France from the Restoration to the separation of church and state, 1815-1905." in Sheridan Gilley and Brian Stanley, eds., The Cambridge history of Christianity (2014) 8: 217-232
- Misner, Paul. (1992) "Social catholicism in nineteenth-century Europe: A review of recent historiography." Catholic Historical Review 78.4 (1992): 581–600.
- Price, Roger, Religious Renewal in France, 1789-1870: The Roman Catholic Church between Catastrophe and Triumph (2018) online review
- Tallett, Frank, and Nicholas Atkin. Religion, society, and politics in France since 1789 (1991)
- Willaime, Jean-Paul. (2004) "The cultural turn in the sociology of religion in France." Sociology of Religion 65.4 (2004): 373–389.
- Zeldin, Theodore. (1977) France, 1848-1945: Intellect, taste, and anxiety. Vol. 2. (Oxford UP) pp 983–1039.

== Education ==
- Baker, Donald N. and Patrick J. Harrigan, eds. The Making of Frenchmen: current directions in the history of education in France, 1679-1979 (Waterloo, Ontario: Historical Reflections Press, 1980).
- Clark, Linda L. "Approaching the History of Modern French Education: Recent Surveys and Research Guides," French Historical Studies (1987) 15#1 pp. 157–165 in JSTOR
- Corbett, Anne, and Bob Moon, eds. Education in France: continuity and change in the Mitterrand years 1981-1995 (Routledge, 2002)
- Duru-Bellat, Marie. "France: permanence and change." in Yan Wang, ed. Education policy reform trends in G20 members (Springer, 2013) pp. 19–32.
- Duru-Bellat, Marie. "Recent Trends in Social Reproduction in France: Should the Political Promises of Education be Revisited?" Journal of Education Policy (2008) 23#1: 81–95. doi:10.1080/02680930701754104.
- Foght, H.W. ed. Comparative education (1918), compares United States, England, Germany, France, Canada, and Denmark online
- Harrigan, Patrick. "Women teachers and the schooling of girls in France: Recent historiographical trends." French Historical Studies (1998) 21#4: 593–610. online
- Langan, Elise. "The normative effects of higher education policy in France." International Journal of Educational Research 53 (2012): 32–43.
- Passow, A. Harry et al. The National Case Study: An Empirical Comparative Study of Twenty-One Educational Systems. (1976) online
- van Zanten, Agnès and Claire Maxwell. "Elite Education and the State in France: Durable Ties and New Challenges." British Journal of Sociology of Education (2015). 36#1: 71–94. doi:10.1080/01425692.2014.968245.
- Van Zanten, Agnès. "Widening participation in France and its effects on the field of élite higher education and on educational policy." Policy and Inequality in Education (Springer, 2017) pp. 73–89.

== Literature ==
- Brereton, Geoffrey. A Short History of French Literature (Penguin Books, 1976)
- Burgwinkle, William, Nicholas Hammond, and Emma Wilson, eds. The Cambridge History of French Literature (Cambridge University Press, 2011)
- Cobb, Richard, Promenades: A Historian's Appreciation of Modern French Literature (Oxford University Press, 1980)
- Harvey, Paul, and Janet E. Heseltine, eds. The Oxford Companion to French Literature (Clarendon Press, 1961)
- Hollier, Denis, ed. A New History of French Literature, Harvard University Press, 1989, 1150 pp.
- France, Peter. The New Oxford Companion to Literature in French, (Oxford University Press, 1995), 926 pp., ISBN 0-19-866125-8
- Kay, Sarah, Terence Cave, Malcolm Bowie. A Short History of French Literature (Oxford University Press, 2006), 356 pp., ISBN 0-19-929118-7
- Lemaitre, Georges. From Cubism to Surrealism in French Literature (Harvard University Press, 1941)
- Peyre, Henri. The Contemporary French Novel (Oxford University Press, 1955)
- Reid, Joyce M.H. The Concise Oxford Dictionary of French Literature (Oxford UP, 1976)
- Saintsbury, George (1911). "French Literature" . In Chisholm, Hugh (ed.). Encyclopædia Britannica. Vol. 11 (11th ed.). Cambridge University Press. pp. 110–154. an alternative point of view.
- Sapiro, Gisèle. The French Writers' War 1940-1953 (1999; English edition 2014); highly influential study of intellectuals in the French Resistance online review

== Sport ==
- Holt, R. "Women, men and sport in France, c. 1870–1914: An introductory survey," Journal of Sport History (1991)
- Krasnoff, Lindsay Sarah. The Making of "Les Bleus": Sport in France, 1958-2010 (Lexington Books; 2012) 214 pages; examines the politics of the French state's efforts to create elite athletes in football and basketball at the youth level.
- Terret, Thierry. "Is there a French sport history? Reflections on French sport historiography." International Journal of the History of Sport 28.14 (2011): 2061–2084.
- Weber, Eugen. "Gymnastics and sport in fin de siècle France", American Historical Review 76 (1971)
