= The Oxford History of the French Revolution =

1989 book by William Doyle

- Cover of the first edition
- Author: William Doyle
- Language: English
- Subject: The French Revolution
- Publisher: Oxford University Press
- Publication date: 1989
- Publication place: United Kingdom
- Media type: Print (Hardcover and Paperback)
- Pages: 496 (second edition)
- ISBN: 978-0199252985

The Oxford History of the French Revolution (1989; second edition 2002; third edition 2018) is a history of the French Revolution by the British historian William Doyle, in which the author analyzes the impact of the revolutionary events in France and in the rest of Europe.

The book received positive reviews, complimenting Doyle for the fairness with which he dealt with the Revolution. Its approach has been described as "revisionist", and the book has been compared to the historian Simon Schama's Citizens: A Chronicle of the French Revolution (1989) and J. F. Bosher's The French Revolution (1988). It has been used as a textbook.

== Summary ==
Running from the accession of Louis XVI in 1774, the Oxford History of the French Revolution traces the history of France through revolution, terror, and counter-revolution to the final triumph of Napoleon in 1802. It also analyses the impact of events in France upon the rest of Europe and the world beyond. The study shows how a movement which began with optimism and general enthusiasm soon became a tragedy, not only for the ruling orders, but also for the millions of ordinary people whose lives were disrupted by religious upheaval, economic chaos, and civil and international war.

== Publication history ==
The Oxford History of the French Revolution was first published by Oxford University Press in 1989. A second edition was published in 2002, and a third edition in 2018.

== Reception ==
The Oxford History of the French Revolution received positive reviews from the historian Colin Jones in The Times Literary Supplement, Michael Broers in History, the historian Malcolm Crook in the European Review of History, and the historian Norman Hampson in The English Historical Review, and a mixed review from Thomas J. Schaeper in Library Journal. The book was also discussed in History Today.

Jones compared the book to Schama's Citizens, describing them as "the most important histories of the French Revolution to appear in English in this bicentenary year" and finding it significant that they both viewed the Revolution "as essentially a tragedy". He considered both books "revisionist" in their approach. He described The Oxford History of the French Revolution as "sober, lucid and authoritative", adding that he expected it to "become the standard textbook for the period" and that Doyle approached the subject fairly. However, he considered Doyle "stronger on judicious description than on analysis and exegesis", believing that he offered "political chronology in its tactical and quotidian dimensions rather than an interpretation of the Revolution in terms of wider processes", and that his arguments were sometimes inconsistent.

Broers described the book's approach as "revisionist", comparing it to D. M. G. Sutherland's France, 1789-1815: Revolution and Counterrevolution (1985), as well as Bosher's The French Revolution and Schama's Citizens. He agreed with Doyle's view of the French Revolution as "an essentially political event" and his emphasis on "the importance of the patriot revolt in the United Provinces". He also credited Doyle with providing a "clear and comprehensive" discussion of the French Revolution, including a careful and fair critique of Marxist interpretations. He described the book as a "work of great integrity". Crook credited Doyle with providing an account of the French Revolution that was "sober and balanced", as well as comprehensive and clear. He wrote that the first edition of the book rightly received "plaudits from reviewers in both academic journals and the general press." He noted that many teachers had adopted it as a textbook. However, he noted that the second edition included "relatively few" improvements over the first edition.

Hampson described the book as a "splendid" that had "deservedly become a standard academic textbook". He credited Doyle with showing, "a remarkably encyclopaedic knowledge" of the era of the French Revolution, and discussing its events impartially.

Schaeper wrote that Doyle advanced a "revisionist approach to the French Revolution". He considered it familiar from Doyle's previous work, noting that the book repeated material from Origins of the French Revolution (2nd edition, 1988). Though he considered Doyle's "scholarship and logic" impressive, he considered the book inferior to Schama's Citizens and Bosher's The French Revolution. History Today noted that the book was one of a number of recent works on the French Revolution.

== See also ==
- Historiography of the French Revolution

== Bibliography ==
Books

- Doyle, William (2003). The Oxford History of the French Revolution. Oxford: Oxford University Press. ISBN 0-19-925298-X.

Journals

- Broers, Michael (1991). "Can We Stop the French Revolution?: Reflections on the Revisionist Revolution". History. 76 (246). doi:10.1111/j.1468-229X.1991.tb01534.x. – via EBSCO's Academic Search Complete (subscription required)
- Crook, Malcolm (2004). "The Oxford History of the French Revolution". European Review of History. 11 (3). doi:10.1080/1350748042000313737.
- Hampson, Norman (2005). "The Oxford History of the French Revolution". The English Historical Review. 120 (485). doi:10.1093/ehr/cei090.
- Jones, Colin (1989). "Down with the bourgeoisie". The Times Literary Supplement. 4503.
- Schaeper, Thomas J. (1989). "The Oxford History of the French Revolution/A Cultural History of the French Revolution (Book)". Library Journal. 114 (10). – via EBSCO's Academic Search Complete (subscription required)
- "Getting Ahead: Recent Books on the French Revolution". History Today. 39 (5). 1989. – via EBSCO's Academic Search Complete (subscription required)
