= French society =

French Society may refer to:

- the French people
- Société Honoraire de Français, The Society
- Pi Delta Phi, Honor Society
- The Western Society for French History
- The Society for French Historical Studies
- The French Society for Urban Studies

== See also ==
- France (disambiguation)
- French (disambiguation)
