= 1792 election =

1792 election may refer to:

- 1792 French National Convention election
- 1792 United States presidential election
- 1792–93 United States House of Representatives elections
