= Hervé Leuwers =

French historian (born 1963)

Hervé Leuwers (born 14 February 1963) is a French historian. He is a specialist on Maximilien Robespierre, the history of the French Revolution, and the history of justice and judicial professions.

== Biography ==
Hervé was born in Rosendaël. In 1994 he defended his thesis, devoted to Merlin de Douai (1754-1838). Since 2008 Leuwers teaches at the University of Artois, and then at Lille-III (now the University of Lille). His works are mainly devoted to the history of justice and legal professions, as well as to that of men and the political and judicial branches of the French Revolution. Leuwers was influenced by Gérard Walter, Henri Guillemin, and Norman Hampson.

There have been important recent French biographies in recent years by Hervé Leuwers and Jean-Clément Martin. He published a biography on Robespierre (2014), which offers new analyses, including the importance of the thought of Montesquieu on the deputies in the convention. He demystified some legends, such as that of the meeting of Louis XVI and the young Robespierre in front of Louis-le-Grand in 1775.

In 2018, he published a biography of Camille and Lucile Desmoulins.

Hervé Leuwers has been the director of the historical Record of the French Revolution from 2011 to 2018. Since this date, he is the president of the Society of studies robespierristes and secretary-general of the International Society for the history of the profession of lawyer.

== Publications ==
- Merlin de Douai: un juriste en politique. Arras, Artois presses Université, coll. « Histoire », 1996, ISBN 2-910663-05-1
- L’invention du barreau français (1660-1830). La construction nationale d’un groupe professionnel (2006)
- La justice dans la France moderne. Du roi de justice à la justice de la nation (1498-1792). Paris, Ellipses, 2010
- La Révolution française et l’Empire. Paris, Presses universitaires de France (PUF) 2011
- Defence in writing. The end of the printed legal brief (France, 1788-1792) », Quaderni storici, 3-2012, dicembre, p. 723-744.
- Robespierre. Paris, Fayard, 2014, ISBN 978-2-213-67156-7
- Robespierre. Paris, Pluriel, coll. « Pluriel », 2016 ISBN 978-2-8185-0509-0 Robespierre
- Camille et Lucile Desmoulins: un rêve de république. Paris, Fayard, coll. « Biographies historiques », 2018 ISBN 978-2-213-69373-6
- Maximilien Robespierre. L'homme derrière les légendes. Paris (PUF 2019) ISBN 978-2-13-080027-9
- La Révolution française. Paris (PUF 2020) ISBN 978-2-13-082509-8
