= William Doyle (historian) =

British historian

William Doyle FBA (born 1942) is a British historian, specialising in 18th-century France, who is most notable for his one-volume Oxford History of the French Revolution (1st edition, 1989; 2nd edition, 2002; 3rd edition, 2018).

He is one of the leading revisionist historians of the French Revolution, obtaining his doctorate from the University of Oxford with his thesis The parlementaires of Bordeaux at the end of the eighteenth century, 1775–1790.

He is also professor emeritus of history at Bristol University, a fellow of the British Academy and a trustee of The Society for the Study of French History.

== Published works ==
- Parlement of Bordeaux and the End of the Old Regime (St. Martin's Press, 1975)
- The Old European Order 1660–1800 (Oxford University Press, 1978)
- Origins of the French Revolution (Oxford University Press, 1980; 3rd edition, 1992)
- The Ancien Regime (Macmillan, 1986)
- The Oxford History of the French Revolution (Oxford University Press, 1989; second edition, 2002; third edition, 2018)
- Venality: the Sale of Offices in Eighteenth-Century France (Oxford University Press, 1996)
- Jansenism: Catholic Resistance to Authority from the Reformation to the French Revolution (Macmillan, 1999)
- The French Revolution: A Very Short Introduction (Oxford University Press, 2001)
- Aristocracy and Its Enemies in the Age of Revolution (Oxford University Press, 2009)
- Aristocracy: A Very Short Introduction (Oxford University Press, 2010)
- Napoleon at Peace (Reaktion Books, 2022)
