= Eugen Weber =

American historian

- Born: April 24, 1925; Bucharest, Kingdom of Romania
- Died: May 17, 2007 (aged 82); Los Angeles, California, United States
- Education: University of Paris; Emmanuel College, Cambridge
- Occupations: Scholar, author, educator
- Known for: Modernization, "The Western Tradition" (lecture series)
- Notable work: Peasants into Frenchmen, etc.
- Spouse: Jacqueline Brument-Roth (m. 1950)
- Website: EugenWeber.com

Eugen Joseph Weber (April 24, 1925 – May 17, 2007) was a Romanian-born American historian with a special focus on Western civilization.

Weber became a historian because of his interest in politics, an interest dating back to at least the age of 12. He described his political awakening as a realization of social injustices: "It was my vague dissatisfaction with social hierarchy, the subjection of servants and peasants, the diffuse violence of everyday life in relatively peaceful country amongst apparently gentle folk".

Weber's books and articles have been translated into several languages. He earned many accolades for his scholarship, including membership in the American Academy of Arts and Sciences, membership to the American Philosophical Society, and fellowships from the National Endowment for the Humanities, the Guggenheim Foundation, the American Council of Learned Societies and the Fulbright Program. His 1,300-page Modern History of Europe: Men, Cultures, and Societies from the Renaissance to the Present (1971) was described "a phenomenal job of synthesis and interpretation that reflects Eugen's wide and deep learning," by his UCLA history colleague Hans Rogger. In addition to his distinguished American Awards and honors, he was awarded the Ordre des Palmes Académiques in 1977 for his contribution to French culture.

== Career ==
Born in Bucharest, Kingdom of Romania, he was the son of Sonia and Emmanuel Weber, a well-to-do industrialist. When Weber was ten, his parents hired a private tutor, but the tutor did not stay long. At age ten, Weber was already reading The Three Musketeers by Alexandre Dumas, adventure novels by Karl May, poetry by Victor Hugo and Homer. Weber was also reading George Sand, Jules Verne, and "every cheap paperback I could afford". At age 12, he was sent to boarding school in Herne Bay, in south-eastern England, and later to Ashville College, Harrogate.

During World War II, he served with the British Army in Belgium, Germany, and India between 1943 and 1947, and rising to the rank of captain. Afterward, Weber studied history at the Sorbonne and Institut d'Etudes Politiques de Paris (Sciences Po) in Paris. While in France he met Jacqueline Brument-Roth, marrying her in 1950.

Returning to Britain, Weber entered Emmanuel College, Cambridge, studying French and European history under David Thomson and graduating with a BA in 1950. He remained at Cambridge to study for a PhD, but his dissertation thesis was rejected after the external examiner, Alfred Cobban of the University of London, gave a negative review, saying it lacked sufficient archival sources.

Weber briefly taught at Emmanuel College (1953–1954) and the University of Alberta (1954–1955) before settling in the United States, where he taught first at the University of Iowa (1955–1956) and then, until 1993 on his retirement, at the University of California, Los Angeles (UCLA).

Eugen Weber wrote a column titled "LA Confidential" for the Los Angeles Times. He also wrote for several French popular newspapers and, in 1989, presented an American public television series, The Western Tradition, which consisted of fifty-two lectures of 30 minutes each. He died in Brentwood, Los Angeles, California, aged 82.

== Methodology ==
Weber took a pragmatic approach to history. He once observed:

Nothing is more concrete than history, nothing less interested in theories or in abstract ideas. The great historians have fewer ideas about history than amateurs do; they merely have a way of ordering their facts to tell their story. It isn't theories they look for, but information, documents, and ideas about how to find and handle them.

== Impact ==
Weber is associated with several important academic arguments. His book Peasants into Frenchmen: The Modernization of Rural France 1870–1914 is seen as an important text on the history of nationalism. Weber outlines a top-down process whereby the central state brings rural communities into a national mainstream through institutions including the judiciary, schools and the military. Peasants into Frenchmen has also been linked to modernization theory. Although other historians such as Henri Mendras had put forward similar theories about the modernization of the French countryside, Weber's book was amongst the first to focus on changes in the period between 1870 and 1914. Weber emphasizes that well into the 19th century few French citizens regularly spoke French, but rather regional languages or dialects such as Breton, Gascon, Basque, Catalan, Flemish, Alsatian, and Corsican. Even in French-speaking areas provincial loyalties often transcended the putative bond of the nation. Between 1870 and 1914, Weber argued, a number of new forces penetrated the previously isolated countryside. These included the judicial and school systems, the army, the church, railways, roads, and a market economy. The result was the wholesale transformation of the population from "peasants," basically ignorant of the wider nation, to Frenchmen.

His book Apocalypses: Prophecies, Cults, and Millennial Beliefs through the Ages chronicles "apocalyptic visions and prophecies from Zarathustra to yesterday ... . beginning with the ancients of the West and the Orient and, especially ... the Jews and earliest Christians," finding that "an absolute belief in the end of time, when good would do final battle with evil, was omnipresent," inspiring "Crusades, scientific discoveries, works of art, voyages such as those of Columbus, rebellions" and reforms including American abolitionism.

== Works ==
- The Nationalist Revival in France, 1905–1914, 1959.
- Action Française: Royalism and Reaction in Twentieth Century France (1962).
- "Nationalism, Socialism and National-Socialism in France," French Historical Studies, Vol. 2, 1962. pp. 273–307 in JSTOR
- Satan Franc-Maçon: la mystification de Leo Taxil, 1964.
- Varieties of Fascism: Doctrines of Revolution in the Twentieth Century (1964).
- co-edited with Hans Rogger, The European Right: A Historical Profile, 1965.
- "Pierre de Coubertin and the Introduction of Organized Sports in France," pp. 3–26 from Journal of Contemporary History, Vol. 5, 1970.
- "Gymnastics and Sports in Fin-de-Siècle France: Opium of the Classes?", pp. 70–98 from American Historical Review, Vol. 76, 1971.
- A Modern History of Europe: Men, Cultures, and Societies from the Renaissance to the Present (1971).
- Peasants into Frenchmen: The Modernization of Rural France, 1870–1914 (1976).
- "The Second Republic, Politics, and the Peasant," French Historical Studies Vol. 11, No. 4 (Autumn, 1980), pp. 521–550 in JSTOR
- "Comment la politique vint aux paysans: A Second Look at Peasant Politicization," American Historical Review, Vol. 87, 1982 pp. 357–389 in JSTOR
- "Fascism(s) and Some Harbingers," Journal of Modern History, Vol. 54, No. 4, December 1982
- "Reflections on the Jews in France," from The Jews in Modern France, edited by Frances Malino and Bernard Wasserstein, 1985.
- France, Fin de Siècle (1986).
- My France: Politics, Culture, Myth, 1991.
- The Hollow Years: France in the 1930s (1994).
- Apocalypses: Prophecies, Cults, and Millennial Beliefs through the Ages (2000).
