= Malcolm Crook =

Malcolm Crook is Emeritus Professor of French history at Keele University and was editor of the journal French History.

He is also a trustee of the Historical Association and The Society for the Study of French History.

== Bibliography ==
- Elections in the French Revolution, 1789-1799 (Cambridge University Press, 1996)
- Napoleon Comes to Power, 1795-1804 (University of Wales Press, 1998)
- Revolutionary France 1788-1880 (Oxford University Press, 2002)
