= Glenn J. Ames =

American academic

Glenn Joseph Ames (born February 3, 1955, in Attleboro, Massachusetts) was an American academic. Ames earned a Bachelor of Arts degree from the University of Rhode Island (1977), and Master of Arts (1982) and Doctor of Philosophy (1987) degrees from the University of Minnesota. In 1988, Ames joined the University of Toledo History Department and taught courses for twenty years on an array of topics including the French Revolution, European expansion to the Indian Ocean basin, and the age of absolutism. Ames joined the UT faculty as an assistant professor of history, was named associate professor in 1993, and a professor of history in 1998.

Ames had a vast publication record of six books and over thirty academic articles. Among his book publications include: En Nome de Deus: The Journal of the First Voyage of Vasco da Gama to India, 1497-1499 (2009), Renascent Empire: The House of Braganza and the Quest for Stability in Portuguese Monsoon Asia, c. 1640-1683 (2000), and Colbert, Mercantilism and the French Quest for Asian Trade (1996).

Ames spent more than five academic years undertaking archival research in France, England, the Netherlands, Portugal, and India. Ames received many awards including a Fulbright Grant (1984), fellowships from the American Institute of Indian Studies (1985), the Portuguese Ministry of Education (1986), and the Calouste Gulbenkian Foundation of Lisbon (2002). Ames was a Leverhulme Trust Post Doctoral Fellow at the University of Bristol (1988) and in 2002 was a Union Pacific Visiting Professor at the Center for Early Modern Europe at the University of Minnesota. In 2004, Ames received the Outstanding Faculty Research Award at the University of Toledo.

At the University of Toledo, Ames served on the Faculty Senate Student Affairs Committee (1992–1996), the Provost's Advisory Committee on Distance Learning (2001–2010), the Faculty Senate (2002, 2007–2010), the Department Liaison for the Writing across the Curriculum Program (1989–2010), and the Arts & Science Council (1990–93, 2006–2010).

Ames was actively involved in professional organizations, such as the Society for Spanish and Portuguese Historical Studies, the Western Society for French History, and the French Colonial Historical Society. Ames worked on the "Slave Route Project," part of The African Diaspora in Asia (TADIA) associate project to UNESCO (2005–2010). In addition, Ames was editor of H-Portugal on the H-Net Web Network as well as General Editor of the European Expansion and Indigenous Response Series with Brill Academic Publishers.

As a professor of history at the University of Toledo, Ames was lauded by students for his multi-disciplinary methodology, engaging lecture style, and radiant sense of humor. Glenn Ames died of cancer on October 14, 2010, at the age of 55.
