= 1792 French National Convention election =

- August 1792 (primary elections); September 1792 (electoral colleges)

All 749 seats in the National Convention
- Turnout: 3,360,000
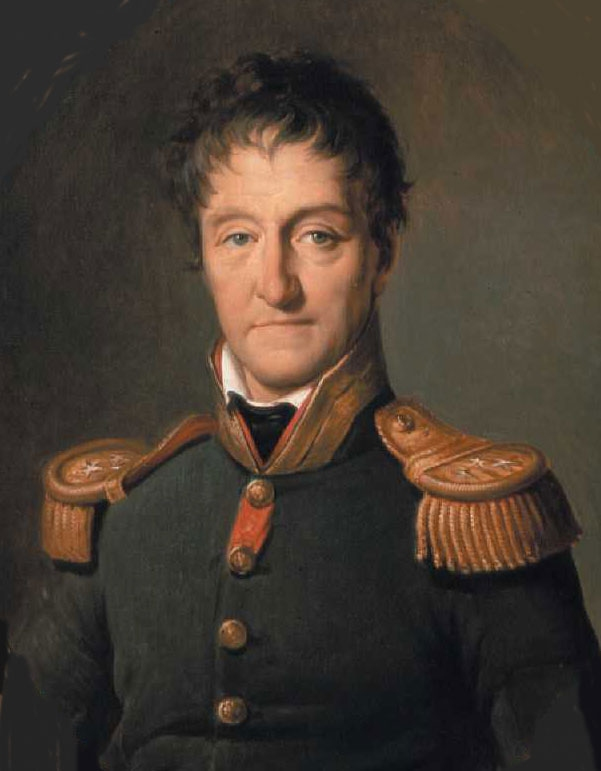

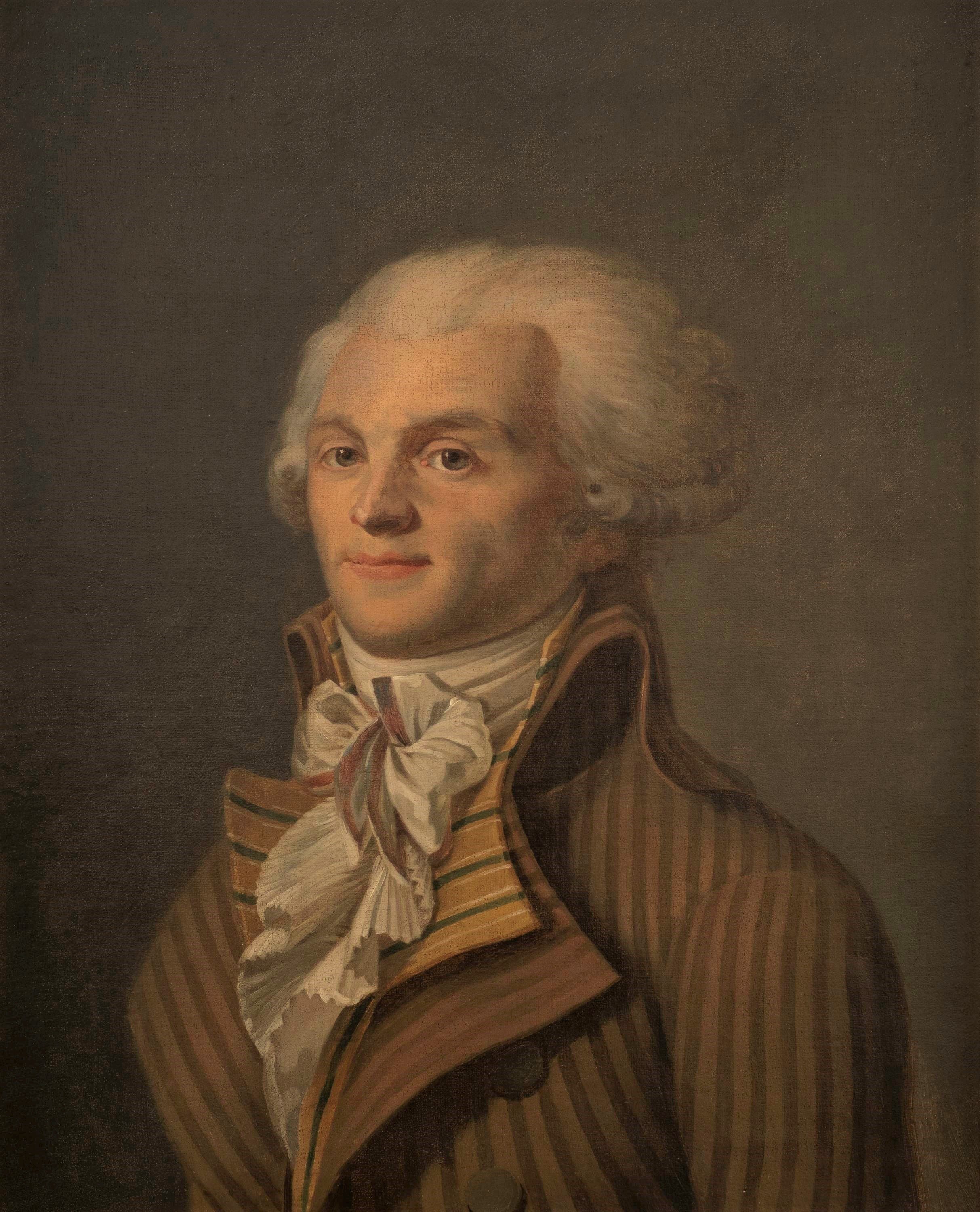

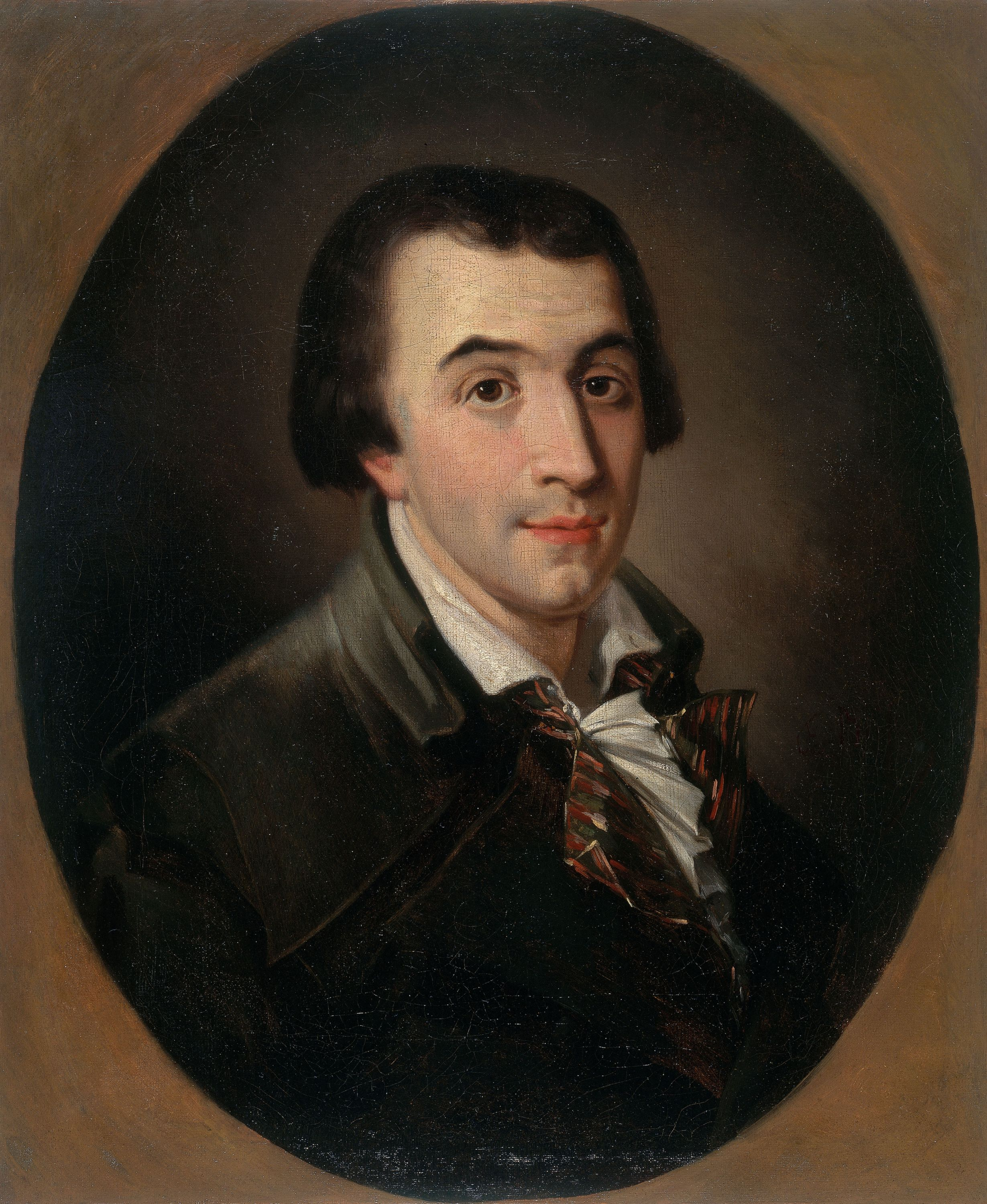
	First party	Second party	Third party
Leader	Lazare Carnot	Maximilien Robespierre	Jacques Pierre Brissot
Party	Marais	Montagnard	Girondins
President of the Assembly before election
Pierre-Joseph Cambon
Jacobin
Subsequent President of the Convention
Jérôme Pétion de Villeneuve
Girondins

Legislative elections were held in France in August and September 1792 to elect deputies to the National Convention. From 26 August, voters in primary assemblies chose electors. The electoral colleges began choosing deputies on 2 September.

== Electoral system ==
The decree of 11 August abolished the distinction between active and passive citizens. Men aged at least 21 could vote if they were French, had lived in the canton for at least one year, supported themselves from their income or labour, and were not domestic servants. The minimum age for election as a deputy was 25. A candidate could stand in any constituency. If no candidate received an absolute majority on the first ballot, only the two candidates with the most votes could compete in the second.

== Campaign ==
The Prussian advance on Longwy and Verdun caused alarm in Paris in late August. The September Massacres began on 2 September, the day the Paris electoral assembly opened.

Historian Malcolm Crook notes that there were organised attempts to intimidate electoral rivals. In Paris, the Paris Commune published lists of suspected royalist electors to be excluded, and electors voted aloud in public. On 27 August, the Place-Vendôme section, chaired by Maximilien Robespierre, proposed allowing the primary assemblies to review and reject the deputies chosen by the electoral assemblies. The Commune later warned the 48 sections against submitting the elected deputies to such a review.

== Results ==
Around 3,360,000 voters participated in the elections, according to historian Roger Dupuy. The largest group in the Convention was the relatively moderate Plain, also known as the Marais. Estimates put its strength at about 389 deputies, compared with about 200 Montagnards and 160 Girondins. These figures are approximate because political affiliations were fluid. About 136 elected deputies joined the Jacobin Club.

The Paris electoral assembly chose 24 deputies and eight substitutes. On 5 September, Robespierre was the first deputy elected, with 338 of the 525 votes cast for the first seat. Georges Danton was elected to the second seat with 638 votes, the highest total recorded in the Paris election, and Collot d'Herbois was elected third.

== Aftermath ==
The deputies held a preparatory meeting on 20 September and chose Jérôme Pétion de Villeneuve as president. The Girondins secured most of the posts in the secretariat. On 21 September, the Convention succeeded the Legislative Assembly and abolished the monarchy.
