= Michael Broers =

British historian and academic

Professor Michael Broers FRHistS
- Born: Michael George Broers; 1954 (age 71–72)
- Occupations: Historian and academic
- Title: Professor of Western European History
- Awards: Prix Napoleon (2006)

Academic background
- Education: University of St Andrews (MA); University of Oxford (DPhil)
- Thesis: The restoration of order in Napoleonic Piedmont, 1797-1814, with particular reference to the departments of Stura and Marengo (1986)
- Doctoral advisor: Richard Cobb

Academic work
- Institutions: University of Aberdeen; University of Leeds; Kalamazoo College; Lady Margaret Hall, Oxford

Michael George Broers FRHistS (born 1954) is a British historian. Broers is Professor of Western European History at the University of Oxford. He was Fellow and Tutor in History at Lady Margaret Hall from 2004 until his retirement in 2022.

Broers attended the University of St Andrews (MA, 1978) and the University of Oxford (DPhil, 1982). His doctoral supervisor was Richard Cobb. Prior to joining Lady Margaret Hall Broers taught at the University of Aberdeen, the University of Leeds and Kalamazoo College. At Lady Margaret Hall he served as the college's wine steward and tutor for admissions.

Broers is the author of several academic books about revolutionary and Napoleonic Europe. He won the Grand Prix Napoléon in 2006. Professor Saul David in The Daily Telegraph wrote that Napoleon: The Spirit of the Age is perhaps the "finest biography of Napoleon ever written". He served as a historical advisor for the 2023 film Napoleon directed by Ridley Scott.

Broers has contributed to academic journals such as War in History, The Historical Journal and Central European History. He is on the editorial boards of the international journal Napoleonica La Revue, "an online review which aims to promote research in the history of the First and Second French Empires". Napoleonica La Revue, "published by the Fondation Napoléon, is academic, multidisciplinary, international and peer-reviewed".

== Bibliography ==
- Europe Under Napoleon, 1799-1815 (1996)
- Europe After Napoleon: Revolution, Reaction, and Romanticism, 1814-1848 (Manchester University, 1996) ISBN 9780719047220
- Napoleonic Imperialism and the Savoyard Monarchy 1773-1821: State Building in Piedmont (Edwin Mellen Press, 1997) ISBN 9780773486096
- Politics and Religion in Napoleonic Italy: The War Against God, 1801-1814 (Routledge, 2001) ISBN 9780415266703
- The Napoleonic Empire in Italy, 1796-1814: Cultural Imperialism in a European Context? (2005) ISBN 9781403905659
- Napoleon's Other War: Bandits, Rebels and their Pursuers in the Age of Revolutions (Peter Lang, 2010) ISBN 9781906165116
- Napoleon
  - volume one: Napoleon: Soldier of Destiny (2014) ISBN 9781605988726
  - volume two: Napoleon: The Spirit of the Age: 1805-1810 (2018) ISBN 9780571301522
  - volume three: Napoleon: The Decline and Fall of an Empire: 1811-1821 (2022) ISBN 9781639364657
- The Napoleonic Mediterranean: Enlightenment, Revolution and Empire (IB Tauris, 2016) ISBN 9781784531447
- (editor) A History of the European Restorations
  - Governments, States and Monarchy (Bloomsbury Academic, 2019) ISBN 9781788318037
  - Culture, Society and Religion (Bloomsbury Academic, 2019) ISBN 9781788318051
- (editor) The Cambridge History of the Napoleonic Wars
  - volume one: Politics and Diplomacy (Cambridge University Press, 2022) ISBN 9781108424370
