= Norman Hampson =

English historian

- Born: 8 April 1922; Leyland, Lancashire
- Died: 8 July 2011 (aged 89)
- Known for: English historian, Professor of History at the University of York
- Parent(s): Frank Hampson & Jane Fazackerley

Norman Hampson (8 April 1922 – 8 July 2011) was an English historian, Professor of History at the University of York from 1974 to 1989. He was a leading authority on the history of the French Revolution, known for challenging the orthodoxies of the dominant "French school" of revolutionary studies. He wrote an authoritative work on the social history of the Revolution.

== Life ==
He was born in Leyland, Lancashire, the son of Frank Hampson, a clerk, and his wife Jane Fazackerley. He was educated at Manchester Grammar School, and matriculated at University College, Oxford in 1940, to read modern history.

Hampson volunteered in 1941, his pacifist inclinations outweighed by his conviction that fascism must be resisted, and his service to 1945 in the Royal Navy included two years as liaison officer with a corvette of the Free French Navy. His autobiographical account of these experiences, "Not Really What You'd Call a War", was published in 2001. After the war he returned as a history student to University College, graduating in 1947. He then submitted a doctorate at the Sorbonne, on the French navy in Year II.

From 1948 until 1967 Hampson was on the staff in departments of the University of Manchester. When his head of department urged him to drop the French Revolution and take up teaching of the Renaissance, he decided to leave and moved to the University of Newcastle. In 1974, he was persuaded by Gerald Aylmer to take up a position in York, where he became head of department in 1978.

Hampson was elected as a fellow of the British Academy in 1980. He was also made the first president of the Society for the Study of French History in 1987. He officially retired in 1989 but continued to teach at the university into his 70s.

== Works ==
Hampson's chief historical focus was upon the Enlightenment and the French Revolution. He was one of a group of British historians, with Alfred Cobban and Richard Cobb, who challenged previous scholarship regarding the Revolution.

- La marine de l’an II : mobilisation de la flotte de l’Ocean, 1793-1794, Paris: Librairie Narcel Rivière, 1959
- A Social History of the French Revolution, London: Routledge and Keegan, 1963
- The Enlightenment, Harmondsworth: Penguin, 1968
- The First European Revolution, 1776–1815, London: Thames & Hudson, 1969 (Library of European Civilization series)
- The Life and Opinions of Maximilien Robespierre, London: Duckworth, 1974
- The French Revolution: A Concise History, London: Thames & Hudson, 1975
- Danton, London: Duckworth, 1978
- Will and Circumstance : Montesquieu, Rousseau and the French Revolution, London: Duckworth, 1983
- Prelude to Terror: The Constituent Assembly and the Failure of Consensus, 1789–1791, Oxford; New York, N.Y.: B. Blackwell, 1988
- Saint-Just, Oxford, UK; Cambridge, Mass., USA : Blackwell, 1991
- The Perfidy of Albion : French Perceptions of England during the French Revolution, Houndmills: Macmillan Press, 1998
- Not Really What You'd Call a War, Whittles Publishing, 2001, a memoir of his wartime experiences. It describes dilemmas of a pacific undergraduate who felt it was his duty to serve in World War II. He wrote poems which featured in war poetry anthologies

Hampson wrote book reviews and articles for publications including the London Review of Books and The New York Review of Books.

== Family ==
In 1948 Hampson married Jacqueline Gardin, the sister of one of his shipmates from his period with the Free French Navy. They were married until her death in 2007. They had two children together, Michèle and Françoise.
