= Sintra National Palace =

Historic house museum in the Lisbon Region of Portugal

Coordinates: 38°47′52″N 9°23′27″W

Sintra Palace
- Palácio de Sintra
- Palace of Sintra, also known as the "Town Palace".

General information
- Location: Sintra, Portugal

UNESCO World Heritage Site
- Part of: Cultural Landscape of Sintra
- Criteria: Cultural: (ii), (iv), (v)
- Reference: 723
- Inscription: 1995 (19th Session)

Portuguese National Monument
- Type: Non-movable
- Criteria: National Monument
- Designated: 16 June 1910
- Reference no.: IPA.00006135

The Palace of Sintra (Portuguese: Palácio de Sintra), also called Town Palace (Palácio da Vila), is located in the town of Sintra, in the Lisbon District of Portugal. It is a present-day historic house museum.

It is the best-preserved medieval royal residence in Portugal, being inhabited more or less continuously from at least the early 15th century to the late 19th century. It is a significant tourist attraction, and is part of the Cultural Landscape of Sintra, a designated UNESCO World Heritage Site.

== History ==
=== Middle ages ===
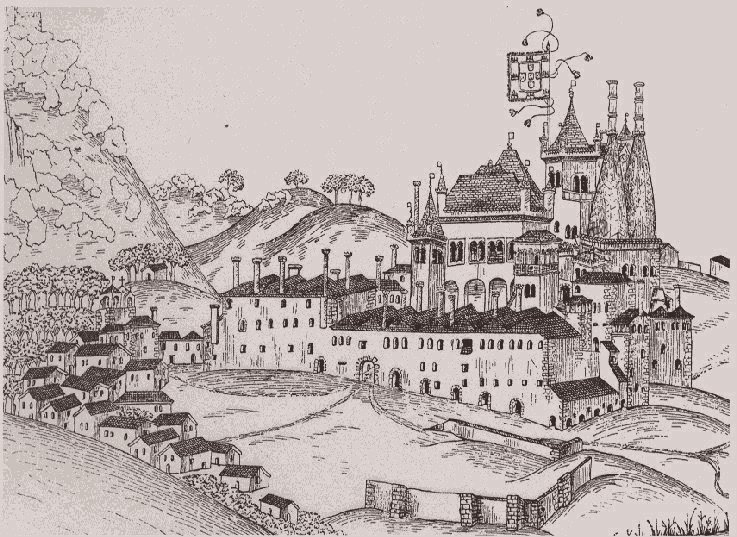
Palace of Sintra drawn by Duarte De Armas around 1509. The Manueline Wing was not yet built. Unlike today, the front courtyard of the palace was enclosed by a wall and several buildings. Clearly visible are the main façade of John's Wing with the entrance gallery as well as the conical kitchen chimneys

It was one of two castles at what is now Sintra in the Moorish Al-Andalus era that began with the Umayyad conquest of Hispania in the 8th century. The other, now known as the Castelo dos Mouros (Castle of the Moors), located atop a high hill overlooking modern Sintra, is now a romantic ruin.

The castle now known as Sintra National Palace, located downhill from the Castelo dos Mouros, was the residence of the Islamic Moorish Taifa of Lisbon rulers of the region. The earliest mention in a source is by Arab geographer Al-Bakri. In the 12th century the village was conquered by King Afonso Henriques, who took the 'Sintra Palace' castle for his use. The blend of Gothic, Manueline, Moorish, and Mudéjar styles in the present palace is, however, mainly the result of building campaigns in the 15th and early 16th centuries.

== Chapel ==
Sintra Palace chapel

Nothing built during Moorish rule or during the reign of the first Portuguese kings survives. The earliest surviving part of the palace is the Royal Chapel, possibly built during the reign of Dinis I in the early 14th century. The palace chapel has a tiled floor with tiles in the apse laid to resemble a carpet. The walls are painted in patterned squares that look like tiles and depict the Holy Ghost descending in the form of a dove. The wooden ceiling is decorated in geometrically patterned Moorish latticework.

== Early palace ==
Much of the palace dates from the times of João (John I), who sponsored a major building campaign starting around 1415.

Most buildings surround the central courtyard – called the Ala Joanina (John's Wing) – date from this campaign, including the main building of the façade with the entrance arches and the mullioned windows in Manueline and Moorish styles called biforas. The building contains terraces, a chapel, kitchens, quarters for the affairs of state, scribe, secretary and dispatches, along with this the palace had 26 rooms including:

Sala das Pegas

Sala das Pegas
- The Swan Room (Sala dos Cisnes) in Manueline style, named so because of the swans painted on the ceiling. The number of painted swans, the symbol of the house of the groom, Philip the Good of Burgundy, equals to the bride's, Infanta Isabel, age – 30.
- Magpie Room (Sala das Pegas); the magpies (pegas) painted on the ceiling and the frieze hold the emblem por bem (for honour) in their beaks. This relates to the story that the King John I was caught in the act of kissing a lady-in-waiting by his queen Philippa of Lancaster. To put a stop to all the gossip, he had the room decorated with as many magpies as there were women at the court.
- Patios: the early wing of the palace features courtyards embellished with tiles and featuring Islamic style water pools.

John I's son, Duarte I, was very fond of the palace and stayed long periods here. He left a written description of the palace that is very valuable in understanding the development and use of the building, and confirms that much of the palace built by his father has not changed much since its construction. Another sign of the preference for this palace is that Duarte's successor Afonso V was born (1432) and died (1481) in it. Afonso V's successor, John II, was acclaimed king of Portugal here.

== Medieval palace ==
=== 16th century ===
The Arab Room (Sala dos Árabes)

Circular marble fountain in the Arab Room

Interior of the Royal Kitchen with the Portuguese coat of arms

The Royal Kitchen

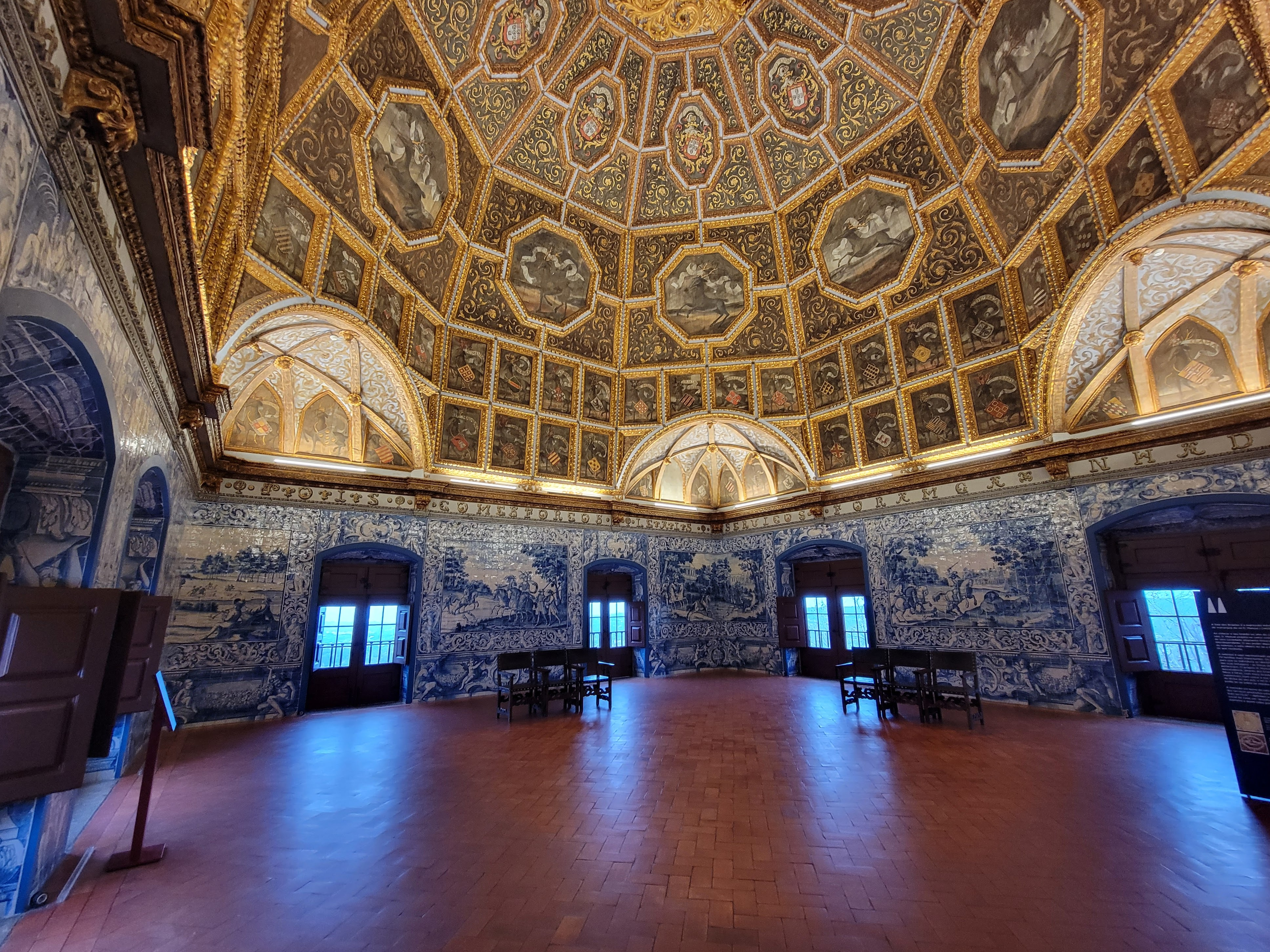
16th-century Sala dos Brasões. The azulejos are of 18th-century.
- Arab Room (Sala dos Árabes) is a tiled room with a Moorish style fountain in the center.
- Kitchens. The pair of extraordinary kitchens are large rooms each with a wall of ovens and cooking stoves above which, in place of a ceiling, rise an enormous pair of conical chimneys that taper as they reach skyward.
- The Coat of Arms Room (Sala dos Brasões), in Manueline style, the most magnificently decorated room in the palace, features the heraldic symbols of the Portuguese noble families, and is one of the most artistically significant heraldic rooms in Europe.

The other major building campaign that defined the structure and decoration of the palace was sponsored by Manuel I between 1497 and 1530, using the wealth engendered by the exploratory expeditions in this Age of Discoveries. The reign of this king saw the development of a transitional Gothic-Renaissance art style, named Manueline, as well as a kind of revival of Islamic artistic influence (Mudéjar) reflected in the choice of polychromed ceramic tiles (azulejos) as a preferred decorative art form.

King Manuel ordered the construction of the so-called Ala Manuelina (Manuel's Wing), to the right of the main façade, decorated with typical manueline windows. He also built the Coats-of-Arms Room (Sala dos Brasões) (1515–1518), with a magnificent wooden coffered domed ceiling decorated with 72 coats-of-arms of the King and the main Portuguese noble families. The coat-of-arms of the Távora family was however removed after their conspiracy against King Joseph I. According to one source, "this new confidant style encompassed Gothic, Renaissance and Mudéjar influences which was later named after the King – Manueline".

King Manuel also redecorated most rooms with polychromed tiles specially made for him in Seville. These multicoloured azulejo tile panels bear Mudéjar motifs.

=== Modern times ===
The Sintra National Palace dominates the view of Sintra; photo from the Castle of the Moors.

In the following centuries the palace continued to be inhabited by kings from time to time, gaining new decoration in the form of paintings, tile panels and furniture. A sad story associated with the palace is that of the mentally unstable Afonso VI, who was deposed by his brother Peter II and forced to live without leaving the residence from 1676 until his death in 1683.

The palace suffered damage after the 1755 Lisbon earthquake but was restored in the "old fashion", according to contemporary accounts. The biggest loss from the great earthquake was the tower over the Arab Room, which collapsed. At the end of the 18th century, Maria I redecorated and redivided the rooms of the Ala Manuelina.

During the 19th century, Sintra became again a favourite spot for the kings and the Palace of Sintra was frequently inhabited. Queen Amélie of Orléans, in particular, was very fond of the palace and made several drawings of it. With the foundation of the Republic, in 1910, it became a national monument. In the 1940s, it was restored by architect Raul Lino, who tried to return it to its former splendour by adding old furniture from other palaces and restoring the tile panels. It has been an important historical tourist attraction ever since.

== Gallery ==
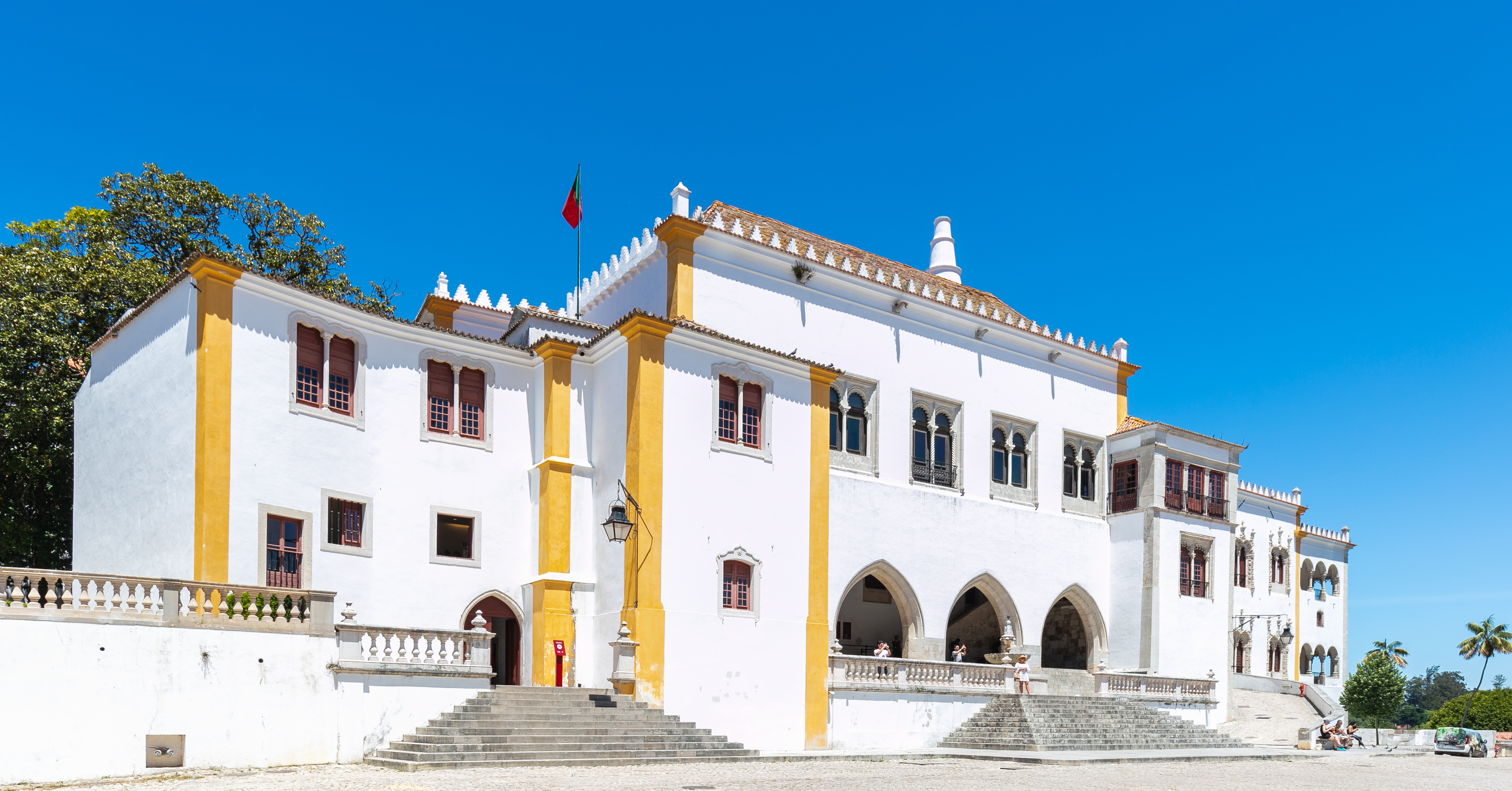
Façade of Sintra National Palace

The conical kitchen chimneys viewed from the central courtyard

The Hall of Swans and its painted ceiling

The domed ceiling of the Hall of Coats of Arms

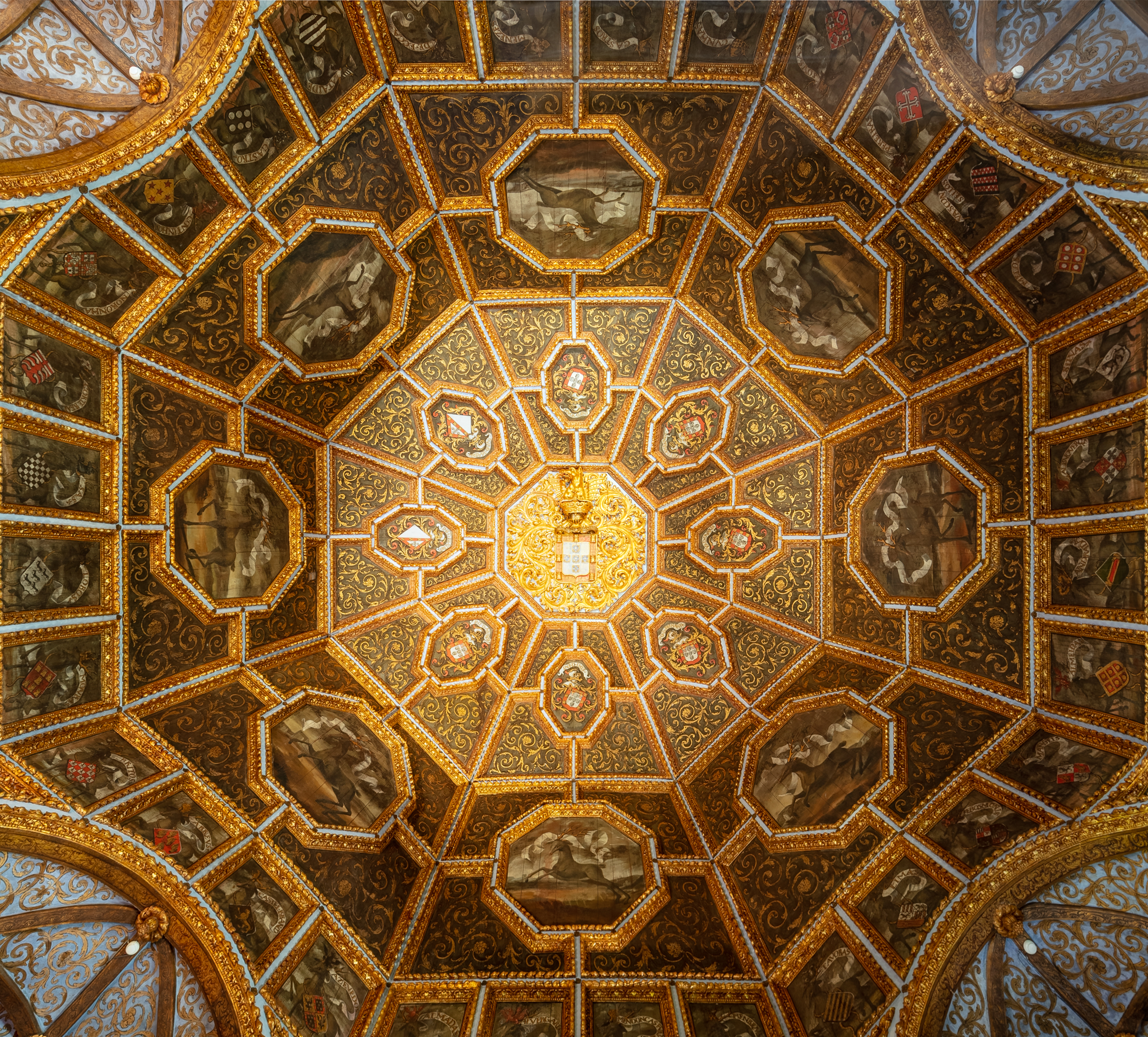
Panoramic view of the domed ceiling of the Hall of Coats of Arms

The fountain with a helical column in the central courtyard

The Water Grotto, decorated with blue-and-white tiles

The Lion's Patio (Pátio do Leão) featuring a cafeteria terrace, leading to the palace gardens and the newly restored Preta Garden

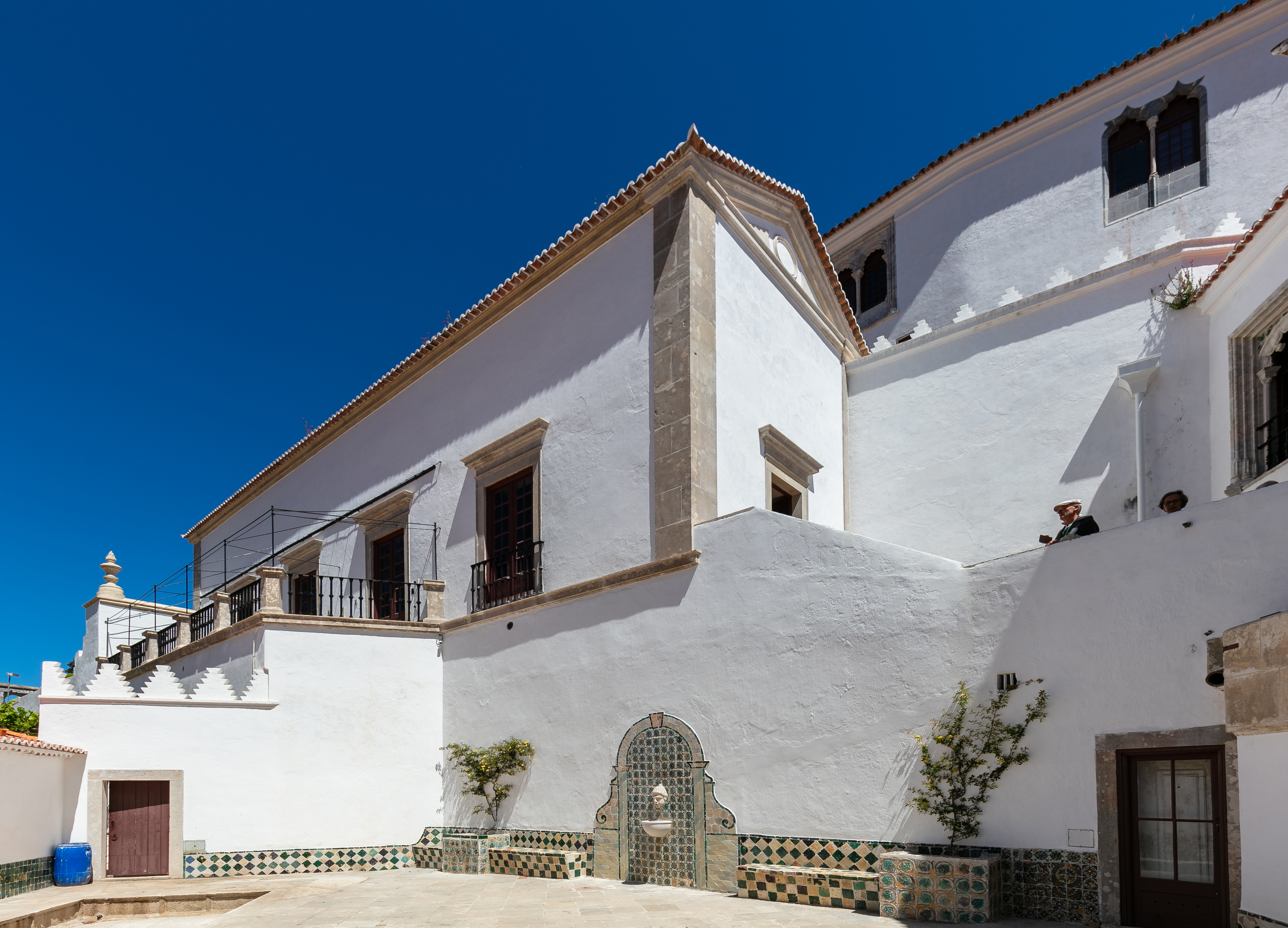
The Lion's Patio

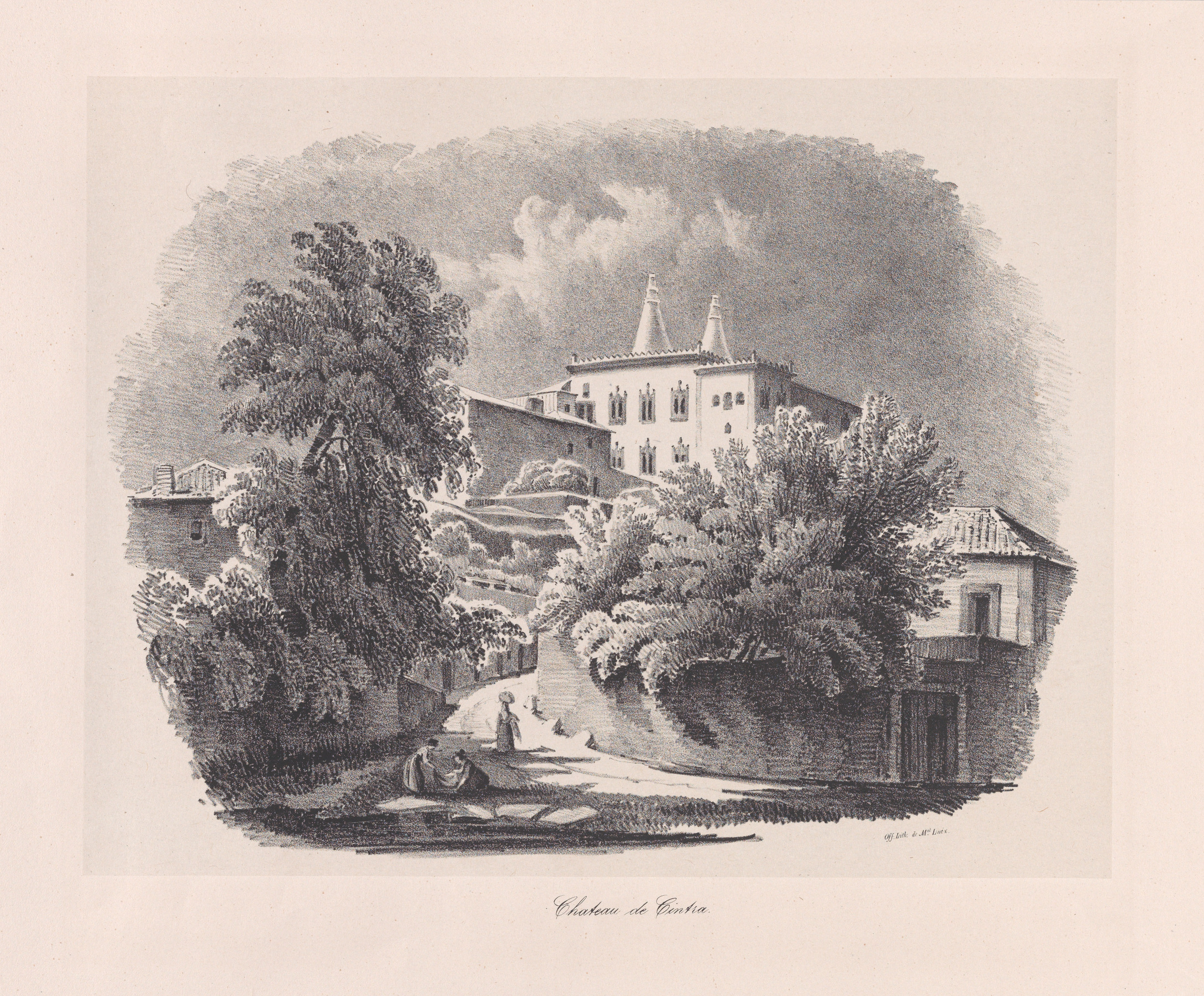
View of the palace from an 1840 print

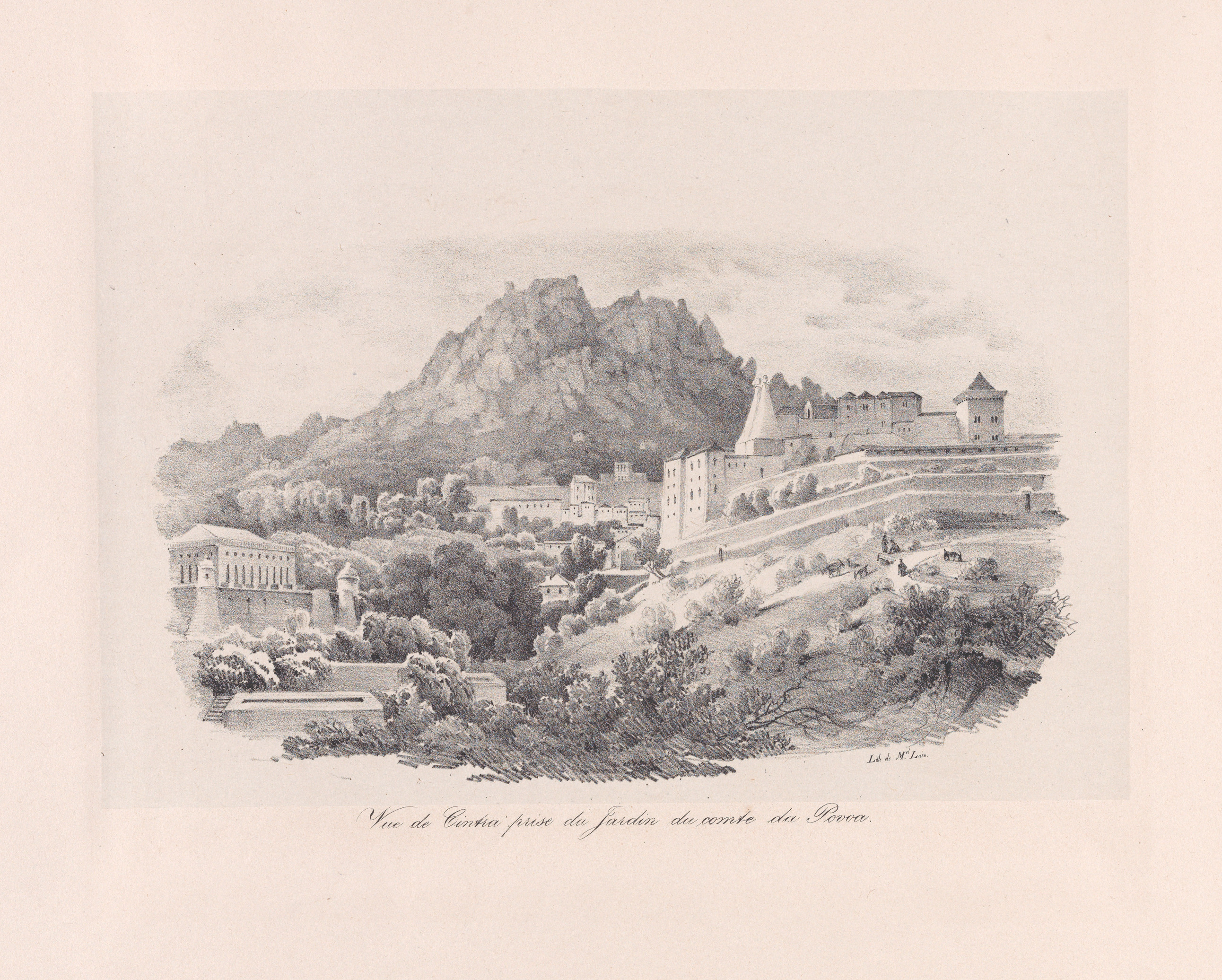
View of the Sintra from the garden of the Comte de Povoa, 1840

== See also ==
- Palaces in Portugal
- Azulejo

== Notes ==
=== References ===
- José Custodio Vieira da Silva. O Palácio Nacional de Sintra. IPPAR-Scala Publishers, 2002 (in Portuguese).
- Turner, J. Grove Dictionary of Art. Macmillan Publishers Ltd., 1996; ISBN 1-884446-00-0
- The Rough Guide to Portugal, 11th ed. March 2005; ISBN 1-84353-438-X
- Art & History : Lisbon. Casa Editrice Bonechi. 2000, p. 110. ISBN 88-8029-394-X
