= H-France =

H-France, founded in 1991, is the largest scholarly organization in the Anglophone world dedicated to the history and culture of the Francophone world. Operated by volunteer doctoral scholars, the organization promotes international academic discussion through three primary channels. It has about 4000 members in 2026. Michael Breen, Professor of History & Humanities at Reed College, is Editor-in-Chief. The Library Guide to "French and Francophone Studies" at the University of Illinois-Urbana Champaign gives H-France prominence as the recommended online resource. According to J.B. Shank, “H-France has quickly made itself into a powerful digital partner in the field-defining discussions.” In 2001 it formed a partnership with the Society for French Historical Studies that made the digital journal H-France Review one of the Society’s official journals. Historian Jeremy D. Popkin argued in 2001 that H-France was transforming how scholars disseminated their findings, with much faster turnaround than paper journals, as well as much longer articles and far more discussion. Furthermore it enabled professors at small schools to have far more interaction with other scholars and specialists.

== Digital publications ==
It publishes several open-access journals, including

- H-France Review (a massive archive of book reviews);
- H-France Forum (scholarly debates),
- H-France Salon (multimedia scholarship), and Imaginaries (media reviews). It also hosts peer-reviewed papers from the George Rudé Seminar.

== Global discussion list ==
It manages a daily email network of 4,000 members across 40 nations, facilitating research inquiries, conference announcements, and professional advice on archives and libraries.

== Web resources ==
Its website provides free access to all publications and specialized tools, including a Scholars Registry, a Digital Humanities Database, and a Research Repository for archival materials.

== See also ==
- History of France
- Society for French Historical Studies, for American scholars
- The Society for the Study of French History, the British counterpart
