= John Baptist Wolf =

American historian (1907–1996)

- Born: July 16, 1907; Ouray, Colorado, U.S.
- Died: April 22, 1996 (aged 88)
- Education: University of Colorado Boulder (BA, MA); Northwestern University; University of Minnesota
- Occupation: Historian

John Baptist Wolf (July 16, 1907 – April 22, 1996) was an American historian, specializing in modern European history.

== Life ==
Born in Ouray, Colorado, on July 16, 1907, Wolf was the son of a German immigrant.

Wolf received his B.A. and M.A. from the University of Colorado, then attended Northwestern University, before entering the doctoral program at the University of Minnesota. He received his doctorate in 1934 for a dissertation on the diplomatic history of the Baghdad Railway, published in 1936.

Wolf began his teaching career at the University of Missouri in 1934, remaining there until 1943, when he took a position at the University of Minnesota. In 1966 he moved to the University of Illinois, Chicago Circle, retiring in 1974 as professor emeritus. Wolf died of leukemia on April 22, 1996, while living in a retirement community located near Syracuse. Writing his obituary (AHA Perspectives Dec. 1996), two of his students, Joseph Klaits and John T. O'Connor, recalled "his wit, passion for history, and zest for life" that stimulated his classes.

== Work ==
Wolf published a number of important books, including France, 1815 to the Present (1940), The Emergence of the Great Powers (1685–1715) (1951), Toward a European Balance of Power (1640–1720) (1969). His most important study was the major biography, Louis XIV (1968).

In retirement Wolf published The Barbary Coast: Algiers under the Turks, 1500-1730 (1979), which was translated into Arabic. He was twice a fellow of the John Simon Guggenheim Memorial Foundation, first in Paris (1959–60), then in Madrid (1967–68). For his work in French history, Wolf was decorated as a Chevalier des Palmes Académiques by the French government in 1979. He was also president of the Society for French Historical Studies (1968–69).
