= The Life and Opinions of Maximilien Robespierre =

1974 book by Norman Hampson

- Author: Norman Hampson
- Language: English
- Subject: Maximillien Robespierre
- Genre: Non-fiction
- Publisher: Gerald Duckworth and Company
- Publication date: 1974

The Life and Opinions of Maximilien Robespierre is a 1974 book written by the historian Norman Hampson and published by Gerald Duckworth and Company.

== Content ==
The work is an unorthodox piece of historical writing since it explores the character and life of Maximilien Robespierre via a conversation between four imagined characters, all of whom represent facets of Hampson's own mind. The effect of this structure is to make it clear that it is difficult for Hampson to draw clear or firm conclusions about such a complex historical figure as Robespierre. This is a way of showing uncertainty and a multi-faceted perspective on such an enigmatic figure as Robespierre that is markedly different from the approach taken by most historians towards their subject-matter when writing biographies.

In contrast to his dismissal of figures such as Jean-Paul Marat or Louis Antoine de Saint-Just, whom he see as lacking humanity let alone reasonable political motivations, Hampson grants Robespierre the existence of a 'potential humanity'. In particular, Hampson's ambivalence towards Robespierre is the result of the conflict between the apparent purity and integrity of Robespierre's principles on the one hand and his espousal of violent political tactics on the other. This tension has been a hallmark of much of the subsequent historiography relating to him, with many biographers being emphatically 'for' or 'against' him in ways that have tended to limit nuanced and complex representations of the man, his aims, and his actions.
