= Prix Napoleon =

Academic awards

The Prix Napoleon is an academic award granted annually by the Fondation Napoléon to the best non-Francophone historical work on the First Napoleonic Empire. It is awarded by HIH the Princess Napoléon and the Prince d'Essling (the incumbent President of the Fondation Napoléon) and the prize usually includes around 10,000 Euros, a commemorative plaque, a case of champagne and six glasses.

The Prix Napoleon constitutes part of the Fondation Napoléon's Grand Prix, a series of history prizes and research grants for academics in the Napoleonic field. According to the Fondation Napoléon's website, the prizes are intended to encourage "the study of and interest in the history of the First and Second Empires and the preservation of Napoleonic heritage".
