= Society for French Historical Studies =

American society for the study of French history

The Society for French Historical Studies (SFHS) is, along with the Western Society for French History (WSFH), one of the two primary historical societies devoted to the study of French history headquartered in the United States.

The SFHS edits the journal French Historical Studies and holds an annual conference. SFHS is affiliated with the academic discussion forum H-France.

At its 1997 annual symposium convened in March in Lexington, Kentucky, SFHS hosted panels titled, "Gender, Work, and Politics in the Longue Durée: The Shifting Boundaries of Women's Work" and "Working Men, Women, and Children in the Streets of Paris: Class, Gender, and Age, 1830-1848." These panels and the paper presented represented a new interest in labor within the SFHS, compared to the previous focus on culture.

The SFHS was informally formed under the leadership of Evelyn Acomb in 1954, holding its first conference in April, 1955 in Ithaca, New York. The first issue of French Historical Studies was published in 1958 with Marvin L. Brown of the University of North Carolina at Chapel Hill serving as its first editor.

== See also ==
- H-France
- The Society for the Study of French History, the British counterpart
