= David Ogg (historian) =

Scottish historian

- Born: 19 June 1887; Glasgow
- Died: 28 March 1965 (aged 77); Oxford

Academic background
- Education: University of Glasgow; Lincoln College, Oxford

Academic work
- Discipline: History
- Institutions: New College, Oxford
- Main interests: Late seventeenth-century England

David Ogg (19 June 1887 - 28 March 1965) was a Scottish historian who specialised in the history of England during the reign of Charles II and of Europe dominated by Louis XIV of France.

== Early life ==
He was born in Glasgow, the son of a civil servant, Archibald Ogg. He was educated at Glasgow University and Lincoln College, Oxford, after he won a scholarship. Ogg won the Stanhope Prize (1910), the Lothian Prize (1911) and the Chancellor's Essay Prize (1912).

== Academic career ==
In 1912 he won an Open Fellowship at New College, Oxford, where he served as tutor and later as sub-warden and librarian. During the First World War, Ogg served in the Royal Navy as Paymaster.

His most popular work, Europe in the Seventeenth Century, was first published in 1923 and went through eight editions during Ogg's life and one last slightly-altered 9th edition after the author passed away. Ogg also wrote histories of the reigns of Charles II and James II.

He retired in 1956 and subsequently held visiting professorships at South Carolina University, Charleston College and the University of Texas. In 1959 he was elected to an Honorary Fellowship at New College.

== Personal life ==
Ogg married Emily Louise White in 1917 and they had one son, John.

== Assessment ==
In 1963, H. E. Bell and R. L. Ollard edited Ogg's festschrift and said of Ogg:

Those who have had the privilege of knowing David Ogg as a tutor or a colleague will not need to be reminded of those qualities of wit and intellectual elegance, of originality of thought and expression, of common sense applied in an uncommon way, that characterise his talk as unmistakenly as his writing. The deceptive ease with which his exact scholarship and wide erudition have been put at our disposal is no small part of the pleasant debt we all owe him.
The same holds true for, though in the nature of the case less personally, for those who know him only through his books. It would be an imperceptive reader who had failed to notice that in both the fields that Ogg has made his own, the England of Charles II and the Europe of Louis XIV, he has challenged both the accepted historiography of the period and the fashionable portrayal of the two eponymous figures of the age. It would be imperceptive, but it would not be impossible. The modulations of irony, the subtle effects of tone, the humility in which, above all, the style reveals the man, will be lost on such as prefer vulgar colours, familiar platitudes, and the techniques of self-advertisement in which modern scholarship can report such notable advances. But the continued and increasing success of Europe in the Seventeenth Century and England in the Reign of Charles II gives good ground for believing that the rare qualities of which his pupils at Oxford and in America have been the chief beneficiaries have been recognised and valued by a far wider public. Of the influence exerted by these books on students of the period there can be no doubt: of their example there cannot be too many imitators.

== Works ==
- Cardinal de Retz 1613-1679 (London: Macmillan, 1912).
- Ioannis Seldeni Ad Fletan Dissertatio (Cambridge: Cambridge University Press, 1925).
- Europe in the Seventeenth Century (London: A. & C. Black, 1923; revised eds. 1931, 1938, 1943, 1948, 1952, 1959, 1960, 1971 [bibliography posthumously revised by D. H. Pennington]). online 8th ed
- Louis XIV (London: Home University Library, 1933). online
- England in the Reign of Charles II (Oxford: Clarendon Press: 2 vols., 1934; 2nd edn., 1956). online
- New England and New College, Oxford, a Link in Anglo-American Relations (Oxford: Clarendon Press, 1937).
- Herbert Fisher 1865-1940 (London: Edward Arnold, 1947).
- England in the Reigns of James II and William III (Oxford: Clarendon Press, 1955; 2nd edn., 1957).
- William III (London: Collins, 1956).
- Europe of the Ancien Regime: 1715-1783 (London: Fontana, 1965). online free to borrow
