= French History (journal) =

- Discipline: History
- Language: English
- Edited by: Julian Wright

Publication details
- History: 1987-present
- Publisher: Oxford University Press (United Kingdom)
- Frequency: Quarterly
- Impact factor: 0.114 (2021)

Standard abbreviations
- ISO 4: Fr. Hist.

Indexing
- ISSN: 0269-1191 (print); 1477-4542 (web)
- LCCN: sf93093789
- OCLC no.: 50234538

Links
- Journal homepage

French History is a journal published by the Oxford University Press on behalf of The Society for the Study of French History.

== Overview ==
Richard Bonney is founding editor in 1987. Its current editors are Tom Hamilton and Claire Eldridge.

It is published four times a year and features articles covering the chronological range from Early Middle Ages to the Contemporary French history.

== See also ==
- List of history journals
