= Richard Bonney =

English historian and priest

Richard Bonney (1947 – 4 August 2017) was an English historian and priest. He was appointed Lecturer in European History at the University of Reading in 1971 and Professor of Modern History at the University of Leicester in 1984, a post from which he retired in 2006. He was the founder of the Society for the Study of French History in the UK and the founding Editor of its Journal, French History, between 1987 and 2001. He was Chevalier dans l'Ordre des Palmes Académiques for services to French culture.

== Early life and education ==
He was educated at Whitgift School in Croydon, Surrey. Bonney's first degree was at Oxford. He submitted his D.Phil. on the intendants of Cardinal Richelieu and Cardinal Mazarin (1624-1661) in 1973, which was subsequently revised and published as Political Change in France under Richelieu and Mazarin, 1624-1661 by Oxford in 1978.

== Academic career and works ==
Numerous other publications on French history and European fiscal history followed. He published: The King’s Debts. Finance and Politics in France, 1589-1661 (1981); Society and Government in France under Richelieu and Mazarin, 1624-61 (1988); L’absolutisme (1989); The European Dynastic States, 1494-1660 (1991); [with M. M. Bonney] Jean-Roland Malet: premier historien des finances de la monarchie française (1993); (ed.) Economic Systems and State finance (1995; French edn. 1996); The Limits of Absolutism in ancien régime France (1995); (ed.) The Rise of the Fiscal State in Europe, c.1200-1815 (1989); [with W.M. Ormrod and M.M. Bonney], Crises, Revolutions and Self-Sustained Growth. Essays in European fiscal history, 1130-1830 (1989); The Thirty Years’ War (2002); Harvest of Hatred. The Concerned Citizens' Tribunal Report on Gujarat (2002); Three Giants of South Asia: Gandhi, and Jinnah on Self-Determination (New Delhi, 2004).

== Religious career and works ==
In 1996 he was ordained as a priest in the Church of England, with other information suggesting this was in 1997. His work on religious pluralism, and particularly his study on Jihad from Qur'an to Bin Laden (2004), has been frequently cited. In 2008 he published False Prophets. The Clash of Civilizations and the Global War against Terrorism and in 2009 The Nazi War on Christianity: the Kulturkampf Newsletters, 1936-1939. Together with Tridivesh Singh Maini and Tahir Malik, he published Warriors after War. Indian and Pakistani Retired Military Leaders Reflect on Relations between the Two Countries, Past, Present and Future (2011).
