= Colin Jones (historian) =

British historian (born 1947)

Colin Jones CBE FRHistS FBA FLSW
- Born: Colin David Hugh Jones; 12 December 1947 (age 78)

Academic background
- Education: Hampton Grammar School
- Alma mater: Jesus College, Oxford; St Antony's College, Oxford
- Thesis: Poverty, vagrancy and society in the Montpellier region, 1740-1815 (1978)
- Doctoral advisor: Richard Cobb

Academic work
- Discipline: History
- Sub-discipline: French history
- Institutions: Newcastle University; University of Exeter; University of Warwick; Queen Mary University of London

Colin David Hugh Jones CBE FRHistS FBA FLSW (born 12 December 1947) is a British historian of France and emeritus professor of history at Queen Mary University of London.

Jones attended Hampton Grammar School. He then studied at Jesus College, Oxford, 1967–71, where he obtained a first-class honours degree in modern history and modern languages (French) and St Antony's College, Oxford, from where he obtained his Doctor of Philosophy degree in 1978. His doctoral thesis was supervised by Richard Cobb.

He began working as a temporary lecturer in history at Newcastle University, 1972–73 before moving on to the University of Exeter, where he remained until 1995. He was then appointed professor of history in the history department of the University of Warwick, where he stayed until 2006.

He is known especially for his Paris, Biography of a City, which won the Enid MacLeod Prize of the Franco-British Society as the book published in 2004 which contributed most to Anglo-French understanding.

Jones was appointed Commander of the Order of the British Empire (CBE) in the 2014 Birthday Honours for services to historical research and higher education. In 2015, Jones was elected a Fellow of the Learned Society of Wales.

== Main publications ==
- Charity and Bienfaisance: The Treatment of the Poor in the Montpellier Region 1740-1815, Cambridge: Cambridge University Press, 1982, xvi + 317 pp.
- The Longman Companion to the French Revolution, London: Longman, 1988, xiv + 473 pp.; Paperback edition, 1990 ISBN 9780582494176
- The Charitable Imperative: Hospitals and Nursing in Ancien Régime and Revolutionary France, London: Routledge, November 1989, xiii + 317 pp.
- (With John Ardagh), Cultural Atlas of France, New York and Oxford: Facts on File, 1991, 240 pp.; French, German, Dutch, Polish translations
- The Cambridge Illustrated History of France, Cambridge: Cambridge University Press, 1994, 352 pp. Paperback edition, 1999; German, Korean, Chinese translations
- (With Laurence Brockliss) The Medical World of Early Modern France, Oxford: Clarendon Press, 1997, xii + 960pp. ISBN 9780198227502
- The Great Nation: France from Louis XV to Napoleon 1715-99, London: Penguin, 2002, xxx + 651pp.; US hardback edition published by Columbia University Press, 2003
- Madame de Pompadour: Images of a Mistress, London: National Gallery Publications with Yale University Press, 2002), 176 pp. Associated with the international exhibition on the same topic held in Versailles, Munich and at the National Gallery, London, 2002
- Paris: Biography of a City, London: Allen Lane/Penguin, 2004, xxviii + 643 pp. US edition, 2005, Penguin/Viking; paperback, 2006; Russian and Chinese translations. Awarded the Enid McLeod Prize of the Franco-British Society as the book published in 2004 which contributed most to Anglo-French understanding.
- The Fall of Robespierre: 24 Hours in Revolutionary Paris. Oxford University Press, 2021. ISBN 9780198715955
- The Shortest History of France. Old Street, 2025. ISBN 9781913083304

Academic offices
Preceded by Martin Daunton	President of the Royal Historical Society; 2008–2012	Succeeded by Peter Mandler
