= French Historical Studies =

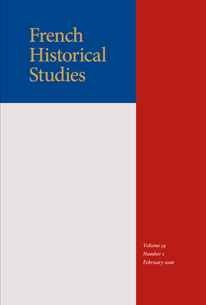
- Discipline: History
- Language: English, French
- Edited by: Christine Haynes, Jennifer Ngaire Heuer

Publication details
- History: 1958–present
- Publisher: Duke University Press (United States)
- Frequency: Quarterly
- Impact factor: 0.50 (2016)

Standard abbreviations
- ISO 4: Fr. Hist. Stud.

Indexing
- ISSN: 0016-1071 (print); 1527-5493 (web)
- LCCN: 59000610
- JSTOR: 00161071
- OCLC no.: 1570174

Links
- Journal homepage; Online access; Online archive

French Historical Studies is a quarterly peer-reviewed academic journal covering French history. It publishes articles in English and French. The journal is published by Duke University Press on behalf of the Society for French Historical Studies.

== History ==
Evelyn Acomb, a historian of French laïcité, found that France lay largely outside the scope of North American historians. In 1954, Acomb and several colleagues founded the Society for French historical Studies to be one of the leading journals in French history. The Society's journal was established in 1958 with Marvin L. Brown Jr., a diplomatic historian from North Carolina State College in Raleigh, was the first editor-in-chief. Brown remained as editor through 1966.

As of 2023, it is edited by Christine Haynes at the University of Carolina in Charlotte and Jennifer Ngaire Heuer at the University of Massachusetts in Amherst.
