= Western Society for French History =

The Western Society for French History (WSFH) is, along with the Society for French Historical Studies, one of the two primary historical societies devoted to the study of French history headquartered in the United States.

The WSFH was founded in 1974, and "seeks to promote the study of French and Francophone history."

From 1974 to 2015 the WSFH published an annual, peer-reviewed journal, Proceedings of the Western Society for French History. In 2015 the title of the journal was changed to The Journal of the Western Society for French History. The Journal is a peer-reviewed, scholarly journal published in an open-access, online format with the Scholarly Publishing Office at the University of Michigan Library.
