= Richard Cobb =

British historian and essayist (1917–1996)

Richard Cobb CBE FBA
- Born: 20 May 1917; Frinton-on-Sea, England
- Died: 15 January 1996 (aged 78); Abingdon, England
- Title: Professor of Modern History
- Children: 4

Academic background
- Education: Merton College, Oxford

Academic work
- Discipline: History
- Sub-discipline: History of France; French Revolution; Social history
- Institutions: Aberystwyth University; University of Leeds; Balliol College, Oxford; Worcester College, Oxford
- Doctoral students: Michael Broers; Martin Conway; Martyn Lyons
- Notable works: The People's Armies

Richard Charles Cobb CBE FBA (20 May 1917 – 15 January 1996) was a British historian and essayist, and professor at the University of Oxford. He was the author of numerous influential works about the history of France, particularly the French Revolution. Cobb meticulously researched the Revolutionary era from a ground-level view sometimes described as "history from below".

Cobb is best known for his multi-volume work The People's Armies (1961), a massive study of the composition and mentality of the Revolution's civilian armed forces. He was a prolific writer of essays from which he fashioned numerous book-length collections about France and its people. Cobb also found much inspiration from his own life, and he composed a multitude of autobiographical writings and personal reflections. Much of his writing went unpublished in his lifetime, and several anthologies were assembled from it by other scholars after his death.

== Education and career ==
Richard Cobb was born in London, England, during World War One, the son of Francis Hills Cobb, who worked in the Sudan Civil Service, and his wife, Dora, daughter of Dr J. P. Swindale. After being educated at Shrewsbury School, he visited France for the first time. He stayed for a year and developed a passion for the country, its people and their history. Returning to England, he matriculated at Merton College, Oxford in 1935, and was awarded a second class degree in History in 1938. During the Second World War he was an instructor to the Polish Air Force, made BBC broadcasts in French, and served in the British Army.

After his military discharge, Cobb returned to France and stayed for another nine years. During this time, Cobb honed his style of historical analysis. He worked closely with the French Marxist-school historians Albert Soboul and George Rudé, frequently sharing research at the National Archives.

Unable to obtain French citizenship, Cobb went back to England in 1955 for a succession of academic jobs. He taught at Aberystwyth University and the University of Leeds, before ultimately returning to Oxford, where he was elected as a tutorial fellow of Balliol College in 1962. Eleven years later, he was made Professor of Modern History of Oxford University, a post with a fellowship at Worcester College. He gave the 1974 Raleigh Lecture on History.

Cobb returned to France repeatedly, sometimes to give courses of lectures at the Collège de France. Throughout his life, Cobb displayed an understanding of the country and its people that seemed almost uncanny for a non-native: in the words of fellow historian Guy Chapman, "Few can enjoy the felicity of Mr. Richard Cobb, of becoming so soaked in a society not his by birth that he moves without needing to look where he is placing his feet among its nuances, its customs, its silences."

== Writing and "history from below" ==
Cobb's published work mostly consists of collections of historical essays, of which the most celebrated is The Police and the People: French popular protest, 1789–1820, first published in 1970. Almost all his early historical works were written in French.

Like Soboul and Rudé (and another friend, the older historian Georges Lefebvre), Cobb is counted among the progenitors of the "history from below" school of historical analysis. He wrote with a general sense of agreement toward their Marxist historiography, but Cobb's personal approach always avoided the doctrinaire presumptions common to his French colleagues. Cobb himself fully rejected any identification with Marxist ideology.

While the Marxist writers were more focused on historical movements and trends, Cobb's own vision was more tightly framed on individuals and their unique contributions. Even more importantly, those individuals who captured his attention were not the usual famous names – his favoured subjects were either Everyman figures or obscure persons of unique depth. Cobb had "an intense identification with the people who experience rather than make history." In his books and essays, Cobb wove compelling stories from raw data: "His approach is that of the novelist or Impressionist painter, communicating, always with compassion and a total absence of solemnity, what history did to ordinary people and how they managed to survive it."

=== The People's Armies ===
Though his published works are mostly essay collections, Cobb's most renowned work is a unified multi-volume analysis – the massive and intricate Les Armées Révolutionnaires, first published in France in 1961. Released in English as The People's Armies in 1987, the book offers a social and political examination of the armed civilian révolutionnaires, including the sans-culottes, the fédérés and numerous other paramilitaries and irregulars. In particular, it chronicles their experiences under the Reign of Terror in what is widely regarded as a "masterly account".

Part of what separates Cobb from Soboul, Rudé, and other traditional Marxists is his view that the popular movement behind the Revolution was lukewarm and thinly spread. In The People's Armies he explains most thoroughly his view that the actions and ultimate course of the Revolution were not necessarily representative of "the people's will", but rather were inserted in history by a relatively small pageant of militant factions and outsized personalities. Cobb's approach has been described as a combination of "mistrust of facile generalization and an enthusiastic appreciation for the colorful tapestry of individual actions that make up past events."

=== Other writing ===
A 1969 collection of Cobb's essays on France and French life, A Second Identity, brought his writing to a popular audience for the first time. In its wide-angle view, the book poignantly intertwines many of Cobb's own personal experiences with those of forgotten participants in historic events. This was followed by more academic works in the 1970s, including Death in Paris (1978), which examines the Revolutionary experience through data mined from hundreds of official death records. This scholarly work earned the Wolfson History Prize for Cobb in 1979.

In later years, Cobb published several volumes of memoirs and observational essays, including a fond account of his childhood in 1920s-era Tunbridge Wells, Still Life (1983), which won the J. R. Ackerley Prize for Autobiography. This was followed by People and Places and A Classical Education, both published in 1985; and Something To Hold on To (1988), in which Cobb recalls his grandparents and other relatives in a highly personalised form of "history from below".

Cobb made his closest venture to a strict linear narrative in A Classical Education. Drawn from memories of his school years, the book tells the story of classmate Edward Ball who, at the age of twenty, was convicted of murdering his own mother. After serving fourteen years in the Central Criminal Lunatic Asylum in Dublin, Ball went to Paris to seek out Cobb. He confessed his guilt to his old friend, but explained his actions with deeper detail than he felt he gave in court. Sympathetically, Cobb recounts the "severe provocation" which drove Ball into "uncontrollable rage".

Cobb's final book was the memoir End of the Line. He completed the manuscript only two days before he died, and friends and family made the arrangements for its publication. New compilations of his various writing have been published since his death, including a collection of personal correspondence, My Dear Hugh: Letters from Richard Cobb to Hugh Trevor-Roper and others (2011).

== Personal life ==
Cobb was married three times and fathered three sons and one daughter. He was known as a wit, a prankster, and a generally irreverent character. He frequently spent long nights in spirited carousing, particularly during his stays in Paris, and throughout his life he retained a reputation for being "iconoclastic" and even "eccentric".

The wry tone that Cobb so frequently employed in his scholarly writing was in regular service in his daily life. An inveterate joker, he would even deflate his own greatest passion with a pointed jab – a quote often attributed to him is, "Wonderful country, France ... pity about the French." His sardonic humour dovetailed with the traits of many of those minor characters in his histories for whom he had a clear admiration. After a fellow historian told him that he "wrote, spoke and thought like a Parisian Street urchin", Cobb called it the greatest compliment he had ever received.

== Death and legacy ==
For academic and literary achievement, Cobb was named as a commander (CBE) of the Order of the British Empire in 1978. Seven years later, he was similarly celebrated in France by the award of membership in the Legion d'Honneur. Cobb died at his home in Abingdon, Oxfordshire, on 15 January 1996 at the age of 78. He had four children and, at the time of his death, was married to his third wife, Margaret.

In addition to Soboul and Rudé, Cobb influenced many other scholars including his Oxford successor Robert Gildea and the historians Colin Lucas, Paul Jankowski, and Simon Schama. He is not, however, without detractors. Cobb's works have been derided by some scholars as misanthropic, an application of Modern Age cynicism to eighteenth-century events. David A. Bell wrote of Cobb: "Because his sympathetic insight did not extend from the monsters and opportunists to the true believers, he ended up, for all the richness of his work, presenting only one side of the Revolution. He even made it somewhat difficult to understand why a revolution happened in the first place."

Though controversial, Cobb is generally considered to be a writer of "formidable historical erudition", and his works offer a similar appeal to students of other disciplines such as psychology, sociology, and literature. As historian Robert Darnton explains, Cobb's lushly detailed works are suffused with "a vision of the human condition that transcends the conventional limits of history writing."

== Works ==
Historical works

- The People's Armies (1961; first English edition, 1987)
- Terreur et subsistances, 1783–1795 (1965) (in French)
- A Second Identity: Essays on France and French History (1969)
- The Police and the People: French Popular Protest, 1789–1820 (1970)
- Reactions to the French Revolution (1972)
- Paris and its Provinces, 1792–1802 (1975)
- A Sense of Place (1975)
- Raymond Queneau (1976)
- Tour De France (1976)
- Death in Paris: The Records of the Basse-Geole de la Seine, October 1795 – September 1801 (1978)
- The Streets of Paris (1979)
- Promenades: A Historian's Appreciation of Modern French Literature (1980)
- French and Germans, Germans and French. A Personal Interpretation of France Under Two Occupations, 1914–1918/1940–1944 (1983)
- The French Revolution: Voices From a Momentous Epoch, 1789–1795 (with Colin Jones; 1988)

Autobiographical works

- Still Life: Sketches from a Tunbridge Wells Childhood (1983)
- People and Places (1985)
- A Classical Education (1985)
- Something To Hold On To: Autobiographical Sketches (1988)

Posthumous publications

- The End of the Line: A Memoir (1997)
- Paris and Elsewhere: Selected Writings (1998)
- The French and Their Revolution: Selected Writings (1999)
- Marseille (2001)
- My Dear Hugh: Letters from Richard Cobb to Hugh Trevor-Roper and others (2011)

A trove of Cobb's extant papers and correspondence (1941–1997) is maintained at the Merton College Library in Oxford.
