= The Society for the Study of French History =

The Society for the Study of French History (SSFH) is a society in the United Kingdom established to promote research in French history.

The society was founded in 1986 by Richard Bonney and granted charitable status in 1992.

It publishes the journal French History and holds an annual conference.

The society's trustees are Daniel Power, Penny Roberts, David Andress, Munro Price, and Jackie Clarke.

== See also ==
- H-FRANCE, the American counterpart
