= List of French historians =

This is a list of French historians limited to those with a biographical entry in either English or French Wikipedia. (Note: All entries in the list are linked, and most are available in English Wikipedia. Entries which are only available in French Wikipedia may be accessed from the superscript '[fr]' attached to the name.) Other major French chroniclers, annalists, philosophers, or other writers are included if they have important historical output.

== Introduction ==
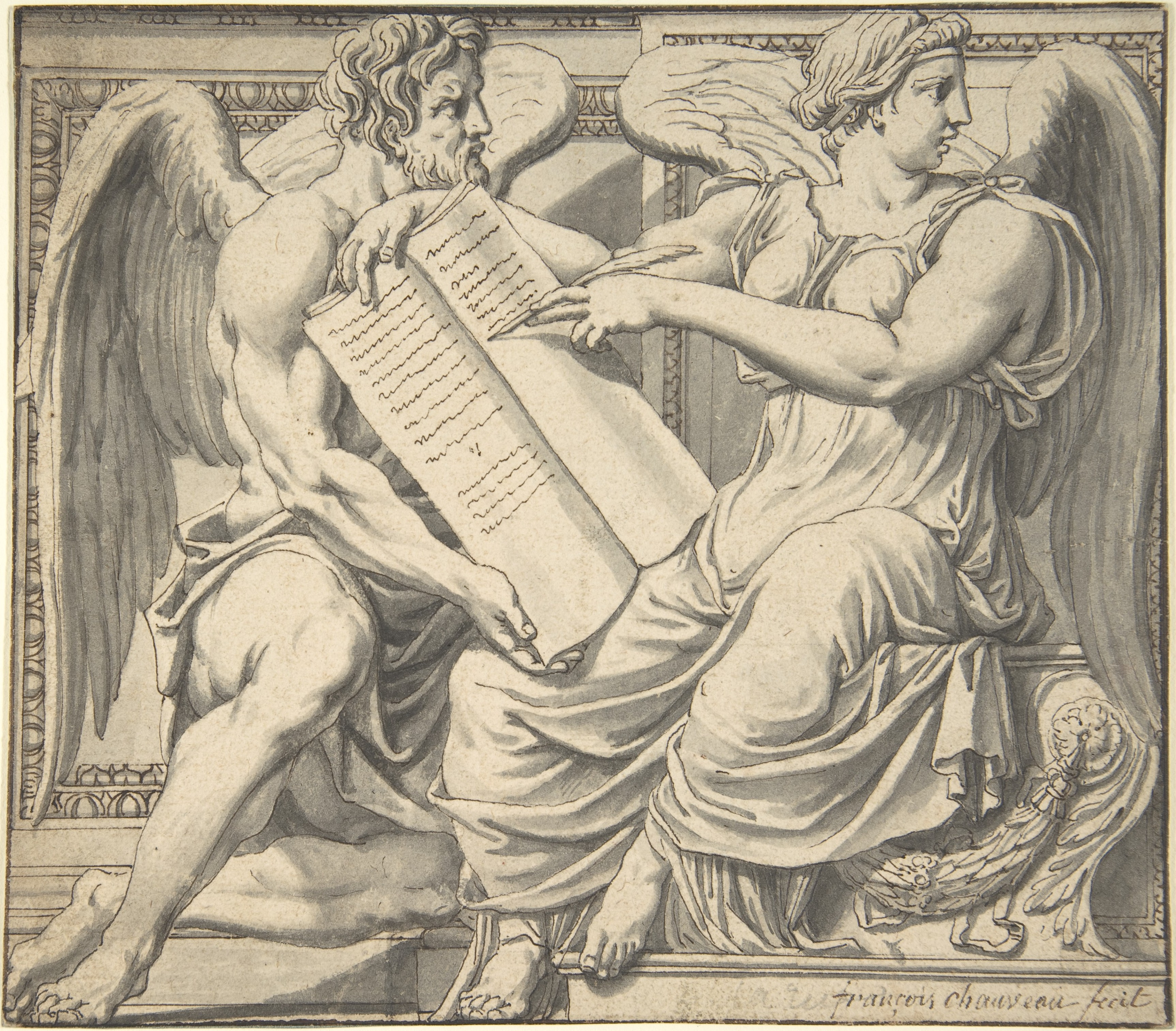
Allegory of History, by François Chauveau

=== Scope and style ===
This article includes French historians and other writers from France making important contributions to history, and having an article in either English or French Wikipedia.

The list is organized chronologically, with sections devoted to time periods. Within a section, authors are listed alphabetically by last name, except for the brief § Middle Ages section, where they are ordered by date of birth.

=== Background ===
History only matured as a serious academic profession in the 19th century. Before that, it was exercised as a literary pursuit by amateurs such as Voltaire, Jules Michelet, and François Guizot. The transition to an academic discipline first occurred in Germany under historian Leopold von Ranke who began offering his university seminar in history in 1833. Similar introduction of the discipline into academia in France took place in the 1860s. Historians active in France at the time such as Henri Sée inherited the principles of a new academic discipline from Ranke and earlier mentors including Numa Denis Fustel de Coulanges.

== Middle Ages ==
listed by date of birth:

- Gregory of Tours (538–594), a Gallo-Roman historian and Bishop of Tours during the Merovingian period. His ten-volume Historia Francorum (History of the Franks) is a primary source for the period. Gregory is recognized as the "father of French history".
- Richerus (fl. 10th century), monk and historian
- Geoffrey of Villehardouin (1150–1210), chronicler of the Fourth Crusade; his account of the Conquest of Constantinople is the oldest surviving historical writing in French.
- Enguerrand de Monstrelet (c. 1400–1453), chronicler
- Thomas Basin (1412–1491)
- Mathieu d'Escouchy (1420–1482), chronicler
- Jean Molinet (1435–1507), chronicler
- Philippe de Commines (1447–1511)

== 16th and 17th centuries ==
listed alphabetically by last name (this, and all subsequent sections):

- Jacques-Bénigne Bossuet (1627-1704)
- Pierre Gassendi (1592-1655)
- François Hotman (1524-1590)
- Montesquieu (1689-1755)
- Philippe de Mornay (1549-1623)
- Honoratus a Sancta Maria (1651-1729)
- Joseph Justus Scaliger (1540-1609)
- Louis-Sébastien Le Nain de Tillemont (1637-1698)
- Voltaire (1694-1778)

== 18th century ==
- François Bruys (1708-1738), historian of the papacy
- Charles Dezobry (1798–1871), historian and historical novelist
- François Guizot (1787–1874), historian of general French, English history
- Pauline de Lézardière (1754–1835), law historian
- Louis Gabriel Michaud (1773–1858)
- Jules Michelet (1798–1874), with a passion for his subjects and le peuple, he has been called "the historian" of France, including his 17-volume Histoire de France
- François Mignet (1796–1884), historian of the Revolution, Middle Ages
- Adolphe Thiers (1797–1877), historian of the Revolution, Empire

== 19th century ==
- Robert Aron (1898–1975), politics; European history, Vichy; his views were upset by the Paxtonian revolution
- François Victor Alphonse Aulard (1849–1928), French Revolution and Napoleon I
- Henri Berr (1863–1954), founder of the journal Revue de synthèse; anticipated the Annales school
- Marc Bloch (1886–1944), medievalist and co-founder of the Annales school
- Pierre Caron (1875–1952), French revolution
- Augustin Cochin (1876–1916), French Revolution
- Léopold Delisle (1826–1910), historian and librarian
- Bernard Faÿ (1893–1978), unique in straddling the divide in transatlantic historiography in the heritage of the Enlightenment, but also a supporter of the Catholic authoritarian right and a virulent agent of Vichy oppression
- Lucien Febvre (1878–1956), early modern Europe; co-founder of Annales school
- Numa Denis Fustel de Coulanges (1830 – 1889) antiquity; political institutions of Roman Gaul; originator of history as a rigorous academic discipline in France, after the techniques first established in Germany by Ranke in the 1830s
- Étienne Gilson (1884–1978), history of philosophy; a traditionalist, with his study of history rooted in religious faith
- Élie Halévy (1870–1937), 19th c. British history; European socialism, with a distinctive, philosophical style
- Henri Hauser (1866–1946), historian, economist, geographer
- Paul Hazard (1878–1944), polymath, traveler, a founder of comparative literature, intellectual historian, his views of early modern Europe are highly influential
- Auguste Himly (1823–1906), historian and geographer
- François Christophe Edmond de Kellermann (1802–1868), political historian
- Ernest Labrousse (1895–1988), influential economic historian of 18th c. France
- Ernest Lavisse (1842–1922), French history
- Georges Lefebvre (1874–1959), proponent of the orthodox, social interpretation of the causes of the French Revolution in the Jaurès tradition, plus its impact on the peasantry; controversial for his leftist politics
- Ferdinand Lot (1866–1952), medievalist, focusing on transition from late antiquity to the Middle Ages
- Albert Mathiez (1874–1932), preeminent authority on the French Revolution
- Ernest Renan (1823–1892), religion, including a 5-volume history of Christianity including a history of Jesus on historical principles
- Pierre Renouvin (1893–1974), international relations, specializing in the origins of World War I and demonstrating Germany's responsibility for the war.
- Gaston Roupnel (1871–1946), a pioneer in early 20th c. French rural historical studies, working in a transitional period where 19th c. historical and philosophical traditions were giving way to new social sciences of the 1920s and 30s
- Gustave Schlumberger (1844–1929)
- Henri Sée (1864–1936), rural society, economics, Middle Ages
- François Simiand (1873–1935), an economist by training and a sociologist, he sought to reform and unify the methodology and practice of all social/human sciences to follow sociological practice and encourage the use of empirical rather than deductive methods
- Hippolyte Taine (1828–1893), French Revolution

== 20th century ==
- Maurice Agulhon (1926–2014), French history of the 19th and 20th centuries
- Henri Amouroux (1920–2007), Nazi occupation of France
- Philippe Ariès (1914–1984), cultural history, with focus on the changing nature of childhood, and attitudes toward death
- Jacques Berque (1910–1995), Arab world; European colonization and decolonization in the modern era
- Fernand Braudel (1902–1985), early modern Europe and the Mediterranean
- Charles-Olivier Carbonell (1930–2013); contemporary history; one of the first to consider French historiography
- Michel de Certeau (1925–1986), multidisciplinary Jesuit scholar of philosophy, religion, psychoanalysis, and history
- Véronique Chankowski (born 1971), economic and social history of the ancient Greek world
- Roger Chartier (born 1945), books, publishing, reading; print culture and reading practices
- Pierre Chaunu (1923–2009), Latin American religious and demographic history; legacy of the French Revolution; contemporary national debates
- Louis Chevalier (1911–2001), population changes in 19th c. Paris
- Alain Corbin (born 1936) Limousin; daily life, emotions, and sensory experience
- Suzanne Débarbat (1928–2024), science and technology
- Jean Delumeau (1923–2020), early modern Europe (esp. France, Italy); Christianity as lived by the masses
- Jacques Droz (1909–1998), German world, political philosophies, diplomacy
- Georges Duby (1919–1996), social and economy of medieval France and Europe
- Jean-Baptiste Duroselle (1917–1994), French diplomacy
- Marc Ferro (1924–2021), his magnum opus Histoire de France is a rare, 20th century account of all of French history written by a single historian, and not entirely in accord with his Annales school beliefs
- Michel Foucault (1926–1984), theories of the structure of power in societies; enormously innovative and influential in a wide range of studies, esp. in the area of cultural history, penology, and sexuality
- Bruno Fuligni (born 1968), French history
- François Furet (1927–1997), key in leading the "exodus of French intellectuals from Marxism", his works went beyond academics to the educated public
- Jacques Godechot (1907–1989), prolific writer about links between the French Revolution and other revolutions, but also counter-revolution, espionage, the press, the Army, and the south of France
- Pierre Goubert (1915–2012), 17th c. peasant life; Beauvais; demographic, economic, and social history
- Michel Kaplan (born 1946), French Byzantinist
- Jacques Le Goff (1924–2014), a leader of the Annales school, and world-renowned medievalist and "mass media star" for his accessible publications and TV appearances, and a founder of historical anthropology
- Emmanuel Le Roy Ladurie (1929–2023), French peasantry of the early modern period; long-term continuities and demographic equilibrium (histoire immobile) of the 14th–17th c.
- Hélène Miard-Delacroix (born 1959), Franco-German relations
- Roland Mousnier (1907–1993), prolific and influential conservative and traditionalist (against the prevailing Annalistes) interpreter of institutions, the venality of nobles, and society
- Gérard Noiriel, immigration in France, social and labor history.
- Pierre Nora (1931–2025), Algeria, "national memory", and a dual career in academia and publishing, reaching a wider audience through new collections issued through Gallimard; French historiography
- Mona Ozouf (born 1931), along with § François Furet, known for their revisionist approach to the French Revolution, contrary to the accepted social interpretation (of Mathiez, Lefebvre, Soboul)
- Michelle Perrot (born 1928), prisons, labor, and women's history
- Antoine Prost (born 1933), 20th-century French history, in particular the First World War.
- René Rémond (1918–2007), politics and religion in modern France
- Daniel Roche (1935–2023), did long-series archival work in social phenomena, and was the outstanding exponent of the Annales school approach to cultural history, esp. regarding the last century leading up to the Revolution.
- Henry Rousso (born 1954), a leading contemporary historian specializing in the Vichy regime
- George Rudé (1910–1993), French revolution
- Pierre de Saint Jacob(1905–1960), medieval rural history, especially of Bourgogne
- Albert Soboul (1914–1982), prolific author on the French revolution based on formidable erudition and meticulous archival work, from a controversial, Marxist point of view
- Jean-Pierre Vernant (1914–2007), French, ancient Greece
- Paul Veyne (1930–2022), French, ancient Greece and Rome
- Pierre Vidal-Naquet (1930–2006), French, ancient Greece, civil rights activist
- Michel Vovelle (1933–2018), social and cultural history of 18th and 19th c. France; key in the historiographical turn away from the Annales paradigm of the longue durée towards history of mentalités and microhistory
- Eugen Weber (1925–2007), modern French

== See also ==
- Historiography of the French Revolution
- List of historians

== Notes and references ==
Notes

Citations

== Works cited ==
- Boyd, Kelly, ed. (1999). "Chronological list of historians". Encyclopedia of Historians and Historical Writing. Taylor and Francis. pp. xxvii–xxxii. ISBN 9781884964336.
- Leclercq, Henri (1910). "St. Gregory of Tours". The Catholic Encyclopedia. New York: Robert Appleton Company.
- Clark, Stuart (1999). The Annales School: Critical Assessments.
- Daileader, Philip; Whalen, Philip, eds. (16 March 2010). French Historians 1900-2000: New Historical Writing in Twentieth-Century France. John Wiley & Sons. ISBN 978-1-4443-2366-5. OCLC 1039171649.
  - Bowman, Jeffrey. "26. Emmanuel Le Roy Ladurie (1929– )". In Daileader & Whalen (2010), pp. 394–416.
  - Callahan, Kevin J. "16. Marc Ferro (1924– )". In Daileader & Whalen (2010), pp. 239–251.
  - Chisick, Harvey. "31. Mona Ozouf (1931– )". In Daileader & Whalen (2010), pp. 462–474.
  - Chisick, Harvey (2010b). "35. Daniel Roche (1935– )". In Daileader & Whalen (2010), pp. 513–526.
  - Collins, James B. "21. Pierre Goubert (1915–2012)". In Daileader & Whalen (2010), pp. 317–327.
  - Collins, James B. (2010b). "38. Pierre de Saint Jacob (1905–1960)". In Daileader & Whalen (2010), pp. 317–327.
  - Cox, Marvin R. "18. François Furet (1927–1997)". In Daileader & Whalen (2010), pp. 271–284.
  - Daileader, Philip (2010b). "19. Étienne Gilson (1884–1978)". In Daileader & Whalen (2010), pp. 285–305.
  - Daileader, Philip (2010c). "22. Elie Halévy (1870–1937)". In Daileader & Whalen (2010), pp. 285–305.
  - Davidson, Denise Z. "32. Michelle Perrot (1928– )". In Daileader & Whalen (2010), pp. 417–427.
  - Davis, Lawrence Harvard. "27. Georges Lefebvre (1902–1985)". In Daileader & Whalen (2010), pp. 417–427.
  - Dursteler, Eric R. "5. Fernand Braudel (1902–1985)". In Daileader & Whalen (2010), pp. 62–76.
  - Frey, Hugo; Flood, Christopher. "37. Henry Rousso (1954– )". In Daileader & Whalen (2010), pp. 545–555.
  - Friguglietti, James. "28. Albert Mathiez (1874–1932)". In Daileader & Whalen (2010), pp. 428–436.
  - Frijhoff, Willem. "6. Michel de Certeau (1925–1986)". In Daileader & Whalen (2010), pp. 76–92.
  - Harvey, John L. "14. Bernard Faÿ (1893–1978)". In Daileader & Whalen (2010), pp. 202–217.
  - Holbrook, Richard C. "30. Pierre Nora (1931– )". In Daileader & Whalen (2010), pp. 445–460.
  - Hutton, Patrick H. "2. Philippe Ariès (1914–1984)". In Daileader & Whalen (2010), pp. 11–22.
  - Kalman, Samuel. "34. René Rémond (1918–2007)". In Daileader & Whalen (2010), pp. 501–512.
  - Kennedy, Emmet. "20. Jacques Godechot (1907–1989)". In Daileader & Whalen (2010), pp. 306–316.
  - Kettering, Sharon. "29. Roland Mousnier (1907–1993)". In Daileader & Whalen (2010), pp. 437–443.
  - Kirsop, Wallace. "15. Lucien Febvre (1878–1956)". In Daileader & Whalen (2010), pp. 218–238.
  - Loft, Leonore. "23. Paul Hazard (1878–1944)". In Daileader & Whalen (2010), pp. 344–349.
  - Mason, Laura. "7. Roger Chartier (1945– )". In Daileader & Whalen (2010), pp. 93–104.
  - McPhee, Peter (2010a). "1. Maurice Agulhon (1926–2014)". In Daileader & Whalen (2010), pp. 1–10.
  - McPhee, Peter (2010b). "10. Alain Corbin (1936– )". In Daileader & Whalen (2010), pp. 136–143.
  - McPhee, Peter (2010c). "41. Albert Soboul (1914–1982)". In Daileader & Whalen (2010), pp. 589–598.
  - McPhee, Peter (2010d). "42. Michel Vovelle (1933–2018)". In Daileader & Whalen (2010), pp. 599–610.
  - Michaud, Francine. "4. Marc Bloch (1886–1944)". In Daileader & Whalen (2010), pp. 38–39.
  - Potter, Mark. "24. Ernest Labrousse (1895–1988)". In Daileader & Whalen (2010), pp. 361–370.
  - Potter, Mark (2010b). "39. Henri Sée (1864–1936)". In Daileader & Whalen (2010), pp. 564–572.
  - Prevenier, Walter. "33. Henri Pirenne (1862–1935)". In Daileader & Whalen (2010), pp. 486–500.
  - Ratcliffe, Barrie M. "9. Louis Chevalier (1911–2001)". In Daileader & Whalen (2010), pp. 112–135.
  - Rollo-Koster, Joëlle. "25. Jacques Le Goff (1924– )". In Daileader & Whalen (2010), pp. 371–393.
  - Shopkow, Leah. "13. Georges Duby (1919–1996)". In Daileader & Whalen (2010), pp. 180–201.
  - Stewart, David. "8. Pierre Chaunu (1923–2009)". In Daileader & Whalen (2010), pp. 105–111.
  - Tendler, Joseph. "12. Jacques Droz (1909–1998)". In Daileader & Whalen (2010), pp. 164–179.
  - Whalen, Philip (2010a). "36. Gaston Roupnel (1871–1946)". In Daileader & Whalen (2010), pp. 164–179.
  - Whalen, Philip (2010b). "40. François Simiand (1873–1935)". In Daileader & Whalen (2010), pp. 573–588.
  - Whidden, James. "3. Jacques Berque (1910–1995)". In Daileader & Whalen (2010), pp. 23–37.
  - Winders, James A. "17. Michel Foucault (1926–1984)". In Daileader & Whalen (2010), pp. 252–270.
  - Worcester, Thomas. "11. Jean Delumeau (1923–2020)". In Daileader & Whalen (2010), pp. 136–143.
- Britannica, The Editors of Encyclopaedia (8 September 2022). "Numa Denis Fustel de Coulanges". Encyclopedia Britannica.
- Britannica, The Editors of Encyclopaedia, ed. (2 May 2020). "Ernest Renan summary". Encyclopedia Britannica.
- Lukacs, John (1977). "Professional History As Myth [Review of Histoire et historiens. Une mutation idéologique des historiens français 1865-1885, by C.-O. Carbonell]". Salmagundi. 37: 155–160. JSTOR 40547080.
- Noronha-DiVanna, Isabel (19 February 2010). Writing History in the Third Republic. Cambridge Scholars Publishing. ISBN 978-1-4438-2010-3. OCLC 1162437900.
- Prag, Eva-Marie; Tendler, Joseph (21 February 2018). "People mentioned in the text". An Analysis of Philippe Aries's Centuries of Childhood. CRC Press. ISBN 978-0-429-93981-5. OCLC 1124498221.
- Rousso, Henry (1991). The Vichy Syndrome. History and Memory in France since 1944. Harvard University Press.
- Smalley, Beryl (1974). Historians in the Middle Ages. London: Thames and Hudson. ISBN 0-684-14121-3. OCLC 1057439.
- "Le Prix international Reimar Lüst décerné à Hélène Miard-Delacroix". Sorbonne Université (in French). 23 November 2022.
- Watson, David Robin (1999). "Renouvin, Pierre". In Boyd, Kelly (ed.). Encyclopedia of Historians and Historical Writers (1st ed.). Routledge. ISBN 978-1884964336. OCLC 905438885.
