= Demonstration of 20 June 1792 =

Bloodless French Revolution Demonstration

The Demonstration of 20 June 1792
- Part of the French Revolution
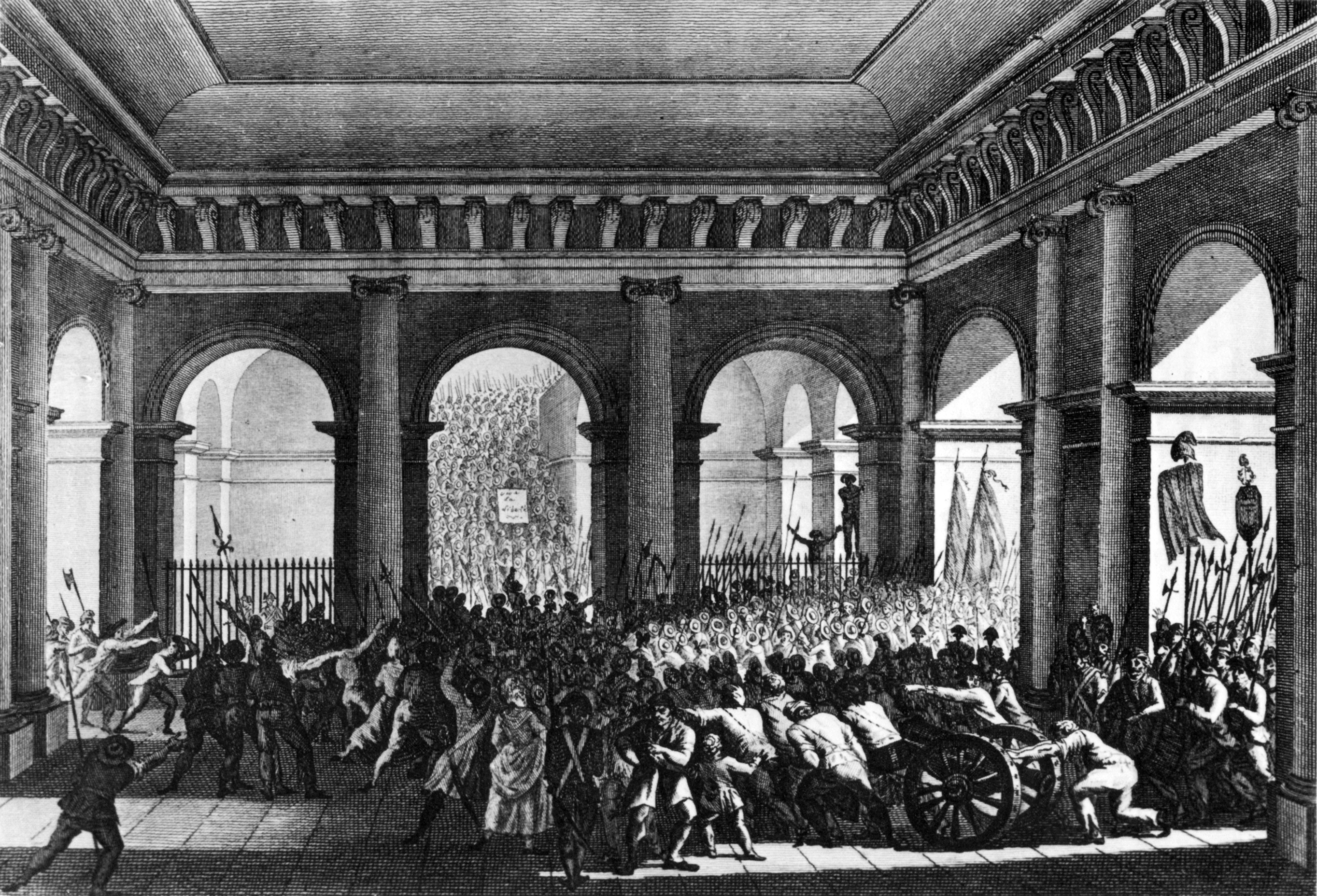
- Le Peuple pénètre dans le Château des Tuileries, Jan Bulthuis, 1800, Musée de la Révolution française.
Date	20 June 1792
Location	Paris, France

The Demonstration of 20 June 1792 (French: Journée du 20 juin 1792) was the last bloodless attempt made by the revolutionaries of Paris to persuade King Louis XVI of France to abandon his current policy and adopt a more compliant role in the escalating frenzy of the French Revolution. The demonstrators' stated aims were to persuade the king to enforce the Legislative Assembly's rulings, defend France against foreign invasion, and conform to the French Constitution of 1791. In particular, the demonstrators, mainly armed sans-culottes and National Guardsmen from the working-class districts of Paris, hoped that the king would withdraw his veto and recall the Girondin ministers.

The demonstrators, numbering 20,000 to 30,000, marched through the National Assembly singing revolutionary songs and shouting slogans. Then the demonstrators marched to the Tuileries Palace where they forced their way into the King's private chambers. The King placated them by donning the Phrygian cap, a revolutionary symbol, and they dispersed peacefully the King did not accept their demands.

The Demonstration was the last phase of the unsuccessful attempt to establish a constitutional monarchy in France. After the Insurrection of 10 August 1792, the monarchy was deposed. Soon after, Louis XVI was beheaded by guillotine.

== See also ==
- Girondins
- Sans-culottes
- Louis XVI and the Legislative Assembly
- Jacobin Club
- Lafayette
- The insurrection of 10 August 1792

== Sources ==
- Aulard, François-Alphonse (1910). The French Revolution, a Political History, 1789-1804, in 4 vols. Vol. I. New York: Charles Scribner's Sons.
- Hampson, Norman (1988). A Social History of the French Revolution. Routledge: University of Toronto Press. ISBN 0-710-06525-6.
- Lefebvre, Georges (1962). The French Revolution: from its Origins to 1793. Vol. I. New York: Columbia University Press. ISBN 0-231-08599-0.
- Madelin, Louis (1926). The French Revolution. London: William Heinemann Ltd.
- Mathiez, Albert (1929). The French Revolution. New York: Alfred a Knopf.
- Mignet, François (1824). History of the French Revolution from 1789 to 1814. Project Gutenberg EBook.
- Pfeiffer, L. B. (1913). The Uprising of June 20, 1792. Lincoln: New Era Printing Company.
- Rude, George (1972). The Crowd in the French Revolution. Oxford: Oxford University Press.
- Soboul, Albert (1974). The French Revolution: 1787-1799. New York: Random House. ISBN 0-394-47392-2.
- Taine, Hippolyte (2011). The Origins of Contemporary France, Volume 3. Project Gutenberg EBook.
- Thompson, J. M. (1959). The French Revolution. Oxford: Basil Blackwell.
- Vovelle, Michel (1984). The Fall of the French monarchy 1787-1792. Cambridge: Cambridge University Press. ISBN 0-521-28916-5.
