= Hippolyte Taine =

French critic, historian, and philosopher (1828–1893)

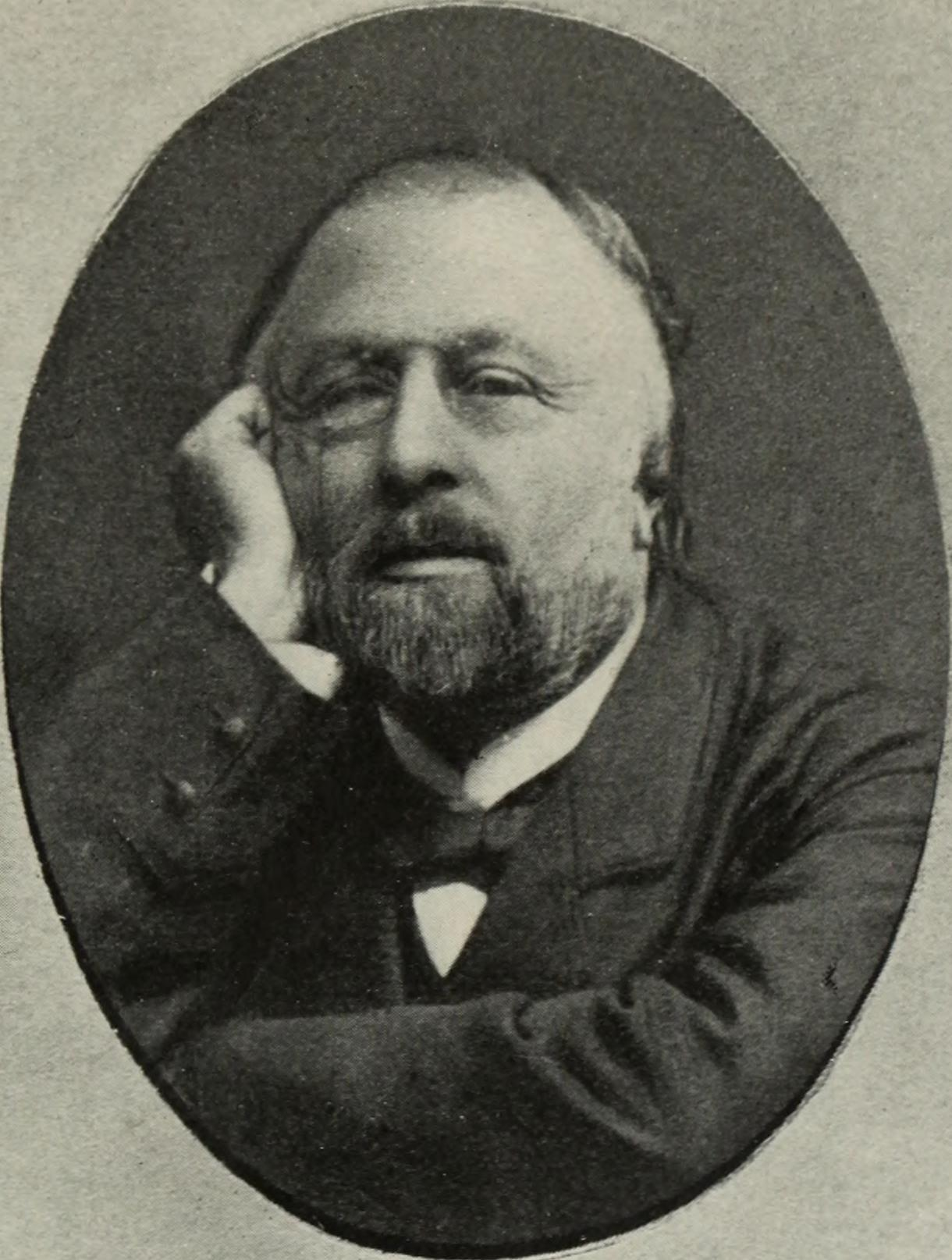
- Born: Hippolyte Adolphe Taine; 21 April 1828; Vouziers, France
- Died: 5 March 1893 (aged 64); Paris, France

Academic background
- Education: École Normale Supérieure

Academic work
- School or tradition: Conservatism; Naturalism; Positivism
- Main interests: Philosophy of art History of France; Political philosophy

Signature
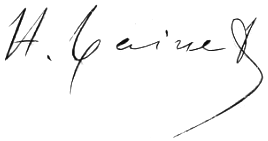

Hippolyte Adolphe Taine (Note: /teɪn/; French: [ipɔlit adɔlf tɛn]) (21 April 1828 – 5 March 1893) was a French historian, critic and philosopher. He was the chief theoretical influence on French naturalism, a major proponent of sociological positivism and one of the first practitioners of historicist criticism. Literary historicism as a critical movement has been said to originate with him. Taine is also remembered for his attempts to provide a scientific account of literature.

Taine had a profound effect on French literature; Maurice Baring wrote in the 1911 Encyclopædia Britannica that "the tone which pervades the works of Zola, Bourget and Maupassant can be immediately attributed to the influence we call Taine's." Out of the trauma of 1871, Taine has been said by one scholar to have "forged the architectural structure of modern French right-wing historiography."

== Early years ==
Taine was born in Vouziers into a fairly prosperous Ardennes family. His father, a lawyer, his uncle, and his grandfather encouraged him to read eclectically and offered him art and music lessons.

In 1841, Taine, then aged 13, lost his father and was sent to a boarding school in Paris, in the Institution Mathé, whose classes were conducted in the Collège Bourbon, located in the Batignolles district. He excelled in his studies and in 1847 obtained two Baccalauréat degrees (Science and Philosophy) and received the honorary prize of the concours. He was awarded a first in the entrance examination of the letters section of the École Normale Supérieure, to which he was admitted in November 1848. Among the 24 students in the letters section, he is the classmate of Francisque Sarcey (who, in his Souvenirs de jeunesse ("Memories of Youth") painted a portrait of young Hippolyte at the Rue d'Ulm campus) and Edmond About. But his attitude—he had a reputation for stubbornness—and his intellectual independence from then fashionable ideas— embodied by Victor Cousin—caused him to fail the examination for the national Concours d'Agrégation in philosophy in 1851. After his essay on sensation was rejected, he abandoned the social sciences and turned to literature. Having relocated outside Paris, he took up teaching positions in Nevers and Poitiers, during which time he continued his intellectual development. In 1853, he obtained a doctorate at the Sorbonne. His thesis, Essai sur les fables de La Fontaine, would later be published in revised form in 1861. His subsequent "Essay on Livy" won a prize from the Académie Française in 1854.

Taine adopted the positivist and scientist ideas that emerged around this time.

After defending his doctorate, he was automatically transferred to Besançon, but he refused this assignment. He settled first in Paris, where he enrolled in the medical school. From there, he went on a medical cure in the Pyrénées in 1855, after which he wrote his famous Voyage aux Pyrénées, and began contributing numerous philosophical, literary, and historical articles to the Revue des deux Mondes and the Journal des débats, two major newspapers at the time.

He then took leave and travelled to England, where he spent six weeks. In 1863 he published his History of English Literature in five volumes. Bishop Félix Dupanloup, who had made it his career to oppose the election of agnostic intellectuals to the Académie Française, opposed the latter's awarding Taine a prize for this work. In 1868, he married Thérèse Denuelle, daughter of Alexandre-Dominique Denuelle. They had two children: Geneviève, wife of Louis Paul-Dubois, and Émile.

The immense success of his work allowed him, not only to live by his pen, but also to be named professor of the History of Art and Aesthetics at the Ecole des Beaux Arts and professor of history and German at the École spéciale militaire de Saint-Cyr. He also taught at Oxford (1871), where he was a Doctor in Law. In 1878, he was elected member of the Académie Française by 20 out of the 26 voters. Taine was interested in many subjects, including art, literature, but especially history. Deeply shaken by the defeat of 1870, as well as by the insurrection (and violent repression) of the Paris Commune, Taine became fully devoted to his major historical work, The Origins of Contemporary France (1875–1893), on which he worked until his death, and which had a significant impact. Conceived by Taine with the aim of understanding the France of his day, the six-volume work analysed the causes of the French Revolution from an original, long-term perspective. In particular, Taine denounced the artificiality of the revolution's political constructions (the excessively abstract and rational ideas of Robespierre, for example), which, in his mind, violently contradicted the natural and slow growth of the institutions of a State.

In 1885, while visiting the Hospital de la Salpêtrière, Taine and Joseph Delboeuf attended a session of hypnotism in which Jean-Martin Charcot induced vesications (blistering) by suggestion.

Taine died on 5 March 1893. He was buried in the Roc de Chère National Nature Reserve, Talloires, on the shores of Lake Annecy. Taine had bought the Boringes property in Menthon-Saint-Bernard (in Haute-Savoie), in order to work there every summer, and had served as councillor of the commune.

== Assessment ==
Taine's writing on the Revolution has remained popular in France. While admired by liberals like Anatole France, it has served to inform the conservative view of the Revolution, since Taine rejected its principles as well as the French Constitution of 1793, on account of their being dishonestly presented to the people. He argued that the Jacobins had responded to the centralisation of the ancien régime with even greater centralisation and favoured the individualism of his concepts of regionalism and nation. Taine's alternative to rationalist liberalism influenced the social policies of the Third Republic.

On the other hand, Taine has likewise received criticism from across the political spectrum, his politics being idiosyncratic, complex, and difficult to define. Among others, attacks came from the Marxist historian George Rudé, a specialist in the French Revolution and in 'history from below', on account of Taine's view of the crowd; and from the Freudian Peter Gay who described Taine's reaction to the Jacobins as stigmatisation. Yet, Alfred Cobban, who advocated a revisionist view of the French Revolution in opposition to the orthodox Marxist school, considered Taine's account of the French Revolution "a brilliant polemic". Taine's vision of the Revolution stands in contrast to the Marxist interpretations that gained prominence in the 20th century, as in the works of Albert Mathiez, Georges Lefebvre, and Albert Soboul, before the revisionist accounts of Alfred Cobban and François Furet.

Notwithstanding academic politics, when Alphonse Aulard, a historian of the French Revolution, analysed Taine's text, he showed that the numerous facts and examples presented by Taine to support his account proved substantially correct; few errors were found by Aulard—fewer than in his own texts, as reported by Augustin Cochin.

In his other writings Taine is known for his attempt to provide a scientific account of literature, a project that has linked him to sociological positivists, although there were important differences. In his view, the work of literature was the product of the author's environment, and an analysis of that environment could yield a perfect understanding of that work; this stands in contrast with the view that the work of literature is the spontaneous creation of genius. Taine based his analysis on categories such as "nation", "environment" or "situation", and "time". Armin Koller has written that in this Taine drew heavily from the philosopher Johann Gottfried Herder, although this has been insufficiently recognised, while the Spanish writer Emilia Pardo Bazán has suggested that a crucial predecessor to Taine's idea was Germaine de Staël's work on the relationship between art and society. Nationalist literary movements and post-modern critics alike have made use of Taine's concepts, the former to argue for their unique and distinct place in literature and the latter to deconstruct the texts with regards to the relationship between literature and social history.

Taine was criticised, including by Émile Zola who owed a great deal to him, for not taking sufficiently into account the individuality of the artist. Zola argued that an artist's temperament could lead him to make unique artistic choices distinct from the environment that shaped him, and gave Édouard Manet as a principal example. Gustave Lanson argued that Taine's environmental determinism could not account for his genius.

== Influence ==
Taine's influence on French intellectual culture and literature was significant. He had a special relationship, in particular, with Émile Zola. As critic Philip Walker says of Zola, "In page after page, including many of his most memorable writings, we are presented with what amounts to a mimesis of the interplay between sensation and imagination which Taine studied at great length and out of which, he believed, emerges the world of the mind." The Spanish philosopher Miguel de Unamuno was fascinated with both Zola and Taine early on (although he eventually concluded that Taine's influence on literature had been negative). French fiction writers Paul Bourget and Guy de Maupassant were also heavily influenced by Taine.

Taine shared a correspondence with the philosopher Friedrich Nietzsche, who later referred to him in Beyond Good and Evil as "the first of living historians". He was also the subject of Stefan Zweig's doctoral thesis, "The Philosophy of Hippolyte Taine." Taine was also read by Peter Kropotkin, who described him as truly understanding the French Revolution, because he "studied the movements preceding the revolution of July 14," or as he quoted Taine himself, "I know of three hundred outbreaks before July 14."

== Works ==
- De Personis Platonicis (1853).
- La Fontaine et ses Fables (1853–1861, Taine's doctoral thesis).
- Voyage aux Pyrénées (1855–1860).
- Essai sur Tite-Live (1856).
- Les Philosophes classiques du XIXe Siècle en France (1857–1868).
- Essais de critique et d'histoire (1858–1882).
- Vie et Opinions politiques d'un chat (1858).
- Histoire de la littérature anglaise (1864).
- Philosophie de l'Art (1865–1882).
- Nouveaux Essais de critique et d'histoire (1865–1901).
- Voyage en Italie (1866).
- Notes sur Paris. Vie et Opinions de M. Frédéric-Thomas Graindorge (1867).
- De l'Intelligence (1870).
- Du Suffrage universel et de la manière de voter (1872).
- Notes sur l'Angleterre (1872).
- Les Origines de la France Contemporaine:
  - L'Ancien Régime (1875).
  - La Révolution: I – l'Anarchie (1878).
  - La Révolution: II – La Conquête jacobine (1881).
  - La Révolution: III – Le Gouvernement révolutionnaire (1883).
  - Le Régime moderne (1890–1893).
- Derniers Essais de critique et d'histoire (1894).
- Carnets de voyage : notes sur la province (1863–1897).
- Étienne Mayran (1910).
- H. Taine, sa vie et sa correspondance (1903–1907).

Works in English translation

- The Philosophy of Art (1865).
- Italy, Rome and Naples (1868).
- Art in Greece (1871).
- Art in the Netherlands (1871).
- English Positivism: A Study on John Stuart Mill (1870).
- On Intelligence (1871, translated by T.D. Haye).
- History of English Literature (1872, translated by Henry Van Laun, and revised 1906–07).
- Notes on England (1872, translated by William Fraser Rae; Edward Hyams, 1957).
- The Ideal in Art (1874, translated by John Durand).
- A Tour Through the Pyrenees (1874, translated by John Safford Fiske).
- Lectures on Art (1875).
- The Origins of Contemporary France (1876, translated by John Durand).
- Notes on Paris (1879, translated by John Austin Stevens).
- Journeys Through France (1896).
- Life and Letters of H. Taine (1902, translated by R.L. Devonshire).

Selected articles

- "Socialism as Government," The Contemporary Review, Vol. XLVI, October 1884.
- "Napoleon's Views of Religion," The North American Review, Vol. 152, No. 414, 1891.
- "On Style," Scribner's Magazine, Vol. 334, No. 4329, 1928.

== See also ==
- Thomas Carlyle and his The French Revolution: A History (1837)
- Jacques Bainville
- Ernest Renan
- Bolesław Prus
- Piotr Chmielowski
- Thomas Blackwell
- Bertrand de Jouvenel
