= Himly =

Himly may refer to:

- Auguste Himly (1823–1906), French historian and geographer
- Edgar Himly (1839–1905), German jurist and civil servant
- Ernst August Wilhelm Himly (1800–1881), German physicist
- Johann Friedrich Wilhelm Himly (1769–1831), German civil servant
- Karl Gustav Himly (1772–1837), German surgeon and ophthalmologist

== See also ==
- Himley, a village in Staffordshire, England
