= Dale K. Van Kley =

American historian

Dale K. Van Kley (July 31, 1941 – March 14, 2023) was an American historian and professor of history at the Ohio State University.

Van Kley wrote numerous books and articles, and taught and conducted research throughout North America and Europe. He is best known for his prize-winning book The Religious Origins of the French Revolution: From Calvin to the Civil Constitution, 1560-1791 (1996). While extensive and diverse, his life's work focused on the contributions that Augustinian theology made to the concepts of liberty that underlay the Enlightenment and the French Revolution.

== Selected articles ==
- "Church, State, and the Ideological Origins of the French Revolution: The Debate over the General Assembly of the Gallican Clergy in 1765," The Journal of Modern History Vol. 51, No. 4, December 1979.
- "The Estates General as Ecumenical Council: The Constitutionalism of Corporate Consensus and the 'Parlement's' Ruling of September 25, 1788," The Journal of Modern History Vol. 61, No. 1, March 1989.
- "Pure Politics in Absolute Space: The English Angle on the Political History of Prerevolutionary France," The Journal of Modern History Vol. 69, No. 4, December 1997.
- "Christianity as Casualty and Chrysalis of Modernity: The Problem of Dechristianization in the French Revolution," The American Historical Review 108 (4) (October 2003): 1081–1104.
- "Religion and the Age of 'Patriot' Reform," The Journal of Modern History Vol. 80, No. 2, June 2008.

== Selected bibliography ==
- The French Idea of Freedom: The Old Regime and the French Declaration of Rights of 1789. Stanford University Press, 1994. (editor)
- The Religious Origins of the French Revolution: From Calvin to the Civil Constitution, 1560-1791. New Haven: Yale University Press, 1996.
- Reform Catholicism and the International Suppression of the Jesuits in Enlightenment Europe. New Haven: Yale University Press, 2018.

== See also ==
- Historiography of the French Revolution
