= Alfred Cobban =

English historian (1901–1968)

- Born: Alfred Bert Carter Cobban; 24 May 1901; Chelsea
- Died: 1 April 1968 (aged 66); Kensington

Academic background
- Education: Gonville and Caius College, Cambridge
- Influences: Hippolyte Taine

Academic work
- School or tradition: Classical liberalism

Alfred Bert Carter Cobban (24 May 1901 – 1 April 1968) was an English historian and Professor of French History at University College, London, who along with prominent French historian François Furet advocated a classical liberal view of the French Revolution.

== Biography ==
Born in London, Cobban was educated at Latymer Upper School and Gonville and Caius College, Cambridge. Before his professorship at University College London, he was a lecturer in history at King's College in Newcastle-on-Tyne (now part of Newcastle University). He held a Rockefeller Fellowship for research in France and was a visiting professor at the University of Chicago and Harvard University.

An editor of History magazine, Cobban also published articles in the English Historical Review, the Political Science Quarterly, International Affairs and other historical and political journals.

A photograph of Alfred Cobban, a complete list of his publications, and an essay on his life and work by C.V. Wedgwood, may be found in 'French Government and Society 1500–1850: Essays in Memory of Alfred Cobban', ed. J.F. Bosher (London, The Athlone Press of the University of London, 1973), 336 pp. The essays in this volume were all written by his students, except one by his friend, George Rudé.

Cobban died in London on 1 April 1968.

== Classical liberal view ==
In 1954 Cobban used his inaugural lecture as professor of French history at University College London to attack what he called the "social interpretation" of the French Revolution. The lecture was later published as "The Myth of the French Revolution" (1955).

Cobban and Furet believed that the Revolution did little to change French society, in direct opposition to the orthodox Marxist school, which saw the Revolution as the rise of the bourgeoisie and proletariat against the nobility and the transition from feudalism to capitalism, making it a symbol of progress.

He believed traditional landowners and the middle class wanted access to political power. He had a predominantly negative view on the incumbent system. Cobban claimed that the quality of daily life after the Revolution remained basically unchanged, identifying that:

1. France was still a rural society with small farms. "Probably some 95 per cent of France's 26 millions lived in isolated farms, hamlets, villages, and small country towns. Mountain and forest still covered, as they do today, large tracts of country, though under pressure of rural over-population farming had pushed into marginal land on moor and hill-top that has since been abandoned. Agriculture, little influenced by the new methods developed in eighteenth-century England, followed its routine of the Middle Ages. Industry was still largely domestic. In all these fundamental respects it matters little whether we are writing of 1789 or 1799. The Revolution did not materially add to or subtract from the basic resources of France, though it altered the use that was, or could be, made of them."
2. The French Industrial Revolution came later in the nineteenth century as most cities retained a majority of small workshops and artisans' small enterprises (often employing around four people) rather than large-scale production facilities (factories), although the latter were found in Anzin, for example. This was a town of iron foundries and coal mining and employed 4000 in these trades.

Cobban claimed that the urban poor fared worse than before as they lost the charity supplied by the Roman Catholic Church. This occurred in 1791 when the National Constituent Assembly abolished the tithe and sold Church properties. Cobban also notes that French society still had a significant amount of social inequality, as many nobles still retained political and economic leadership and dominance under the collective title with the bourgeois as 'Notables'. Sex equality did not advance far, with women still considered the 'lesser' sex as they lost the rights gained during the Revolution under the reign of Napoleon I.

Cobban's views and works in the macrocosm were to be the inspiration and birthplace of the historical school now known as "Revisionism" or "Liberalism". Along with George V. Taylor, Cobban vehemently attacked the traditional Marxist conception of the past within Marx's dialectic, particularly in his work The Social Interpretation of the French Revolution. His resultant argument was that the Revolution could not be seen as a social revolution exacerbated by economic changes (specifically the development of capitalism and by corollary, class conflict between the bourgeoisie and the nobility). Rather, argued Cobban, the French Revolution should be seen as a political revolution with social consequences.

== Publications ==
- 1929 — Burke and the Revolt Against the Eighteenth Century. London: George Allen & Unwin, Ltd.
- 1934 — Rousseau and the Modern State. London: George Allen & Unwin, Ltd.
- 1939 — Dictatorship, its History and Theory. London: Jonathan Cape.
- 1945 — National Self-Determination. Oxford University Press.
  - The Nation State and National Self-Determination. London: Fontana/Collins, 1969.
- 1946 — Historians and the Causes of the French Revolution. London: Routledge & Kegan Paul.
- 1950 — The Debate on the French Revolution, 1789–1800. London: Nicholas Kaye.
- 1954 — Ambassadors and Secret Agents: The Diplomacy of the First Earl of Malmesbury at the Hague. London: Jonathan Cape.
- 1954 — "The history of Vichy France," in Arnold Toynbee, ed., Hitler's Europe. Oxford University Press.
- 1955 —The Myth of the French Revolution. Folcroft Library Editions.
- 1957–1965 — A History of Modern France
  - Penguin edition
    - Volume 1: Old Regime and Revolution, 1715–1799. Harmondsworth: Penguin, 1957.
    - Volume 2: From the First Empire to the Second Empire, 1799–1871. Harmondsworth: Penguin, 1957.
  - Jonathan Cape edition (George Braziller in the United States)
    - Volume 1: The Old Regime and the Revolution, 1715–1799. London: Jonathan Cape, 1962.
    - Volume 2: From the First Empire to the Second Empire, 1799–1871. London: Jonathan Cape, 1963.
    - Volume 3: France of the Republics, 1871–1958. London: Jonathan Cape, 1965.
- 1960 — In Search of Humanity: The Role of the Enlightenment in Modern History. London: Jonathan Cape.
- 1964 — The Social Interpretation of the French Revolution. Cambridge University Press.
- 1967 — The Correspondence of Edmund Burke. Cambridge University Press (with Robert Arthur Smith).
- 1968 — Aspects of the French Revolution. New York: George Braziller.
- 1969 — The Eighteenth Century: Europe in the Age of Enlightenment. London: Thames and Hudson.
