= People's history =

Type of historical narrative

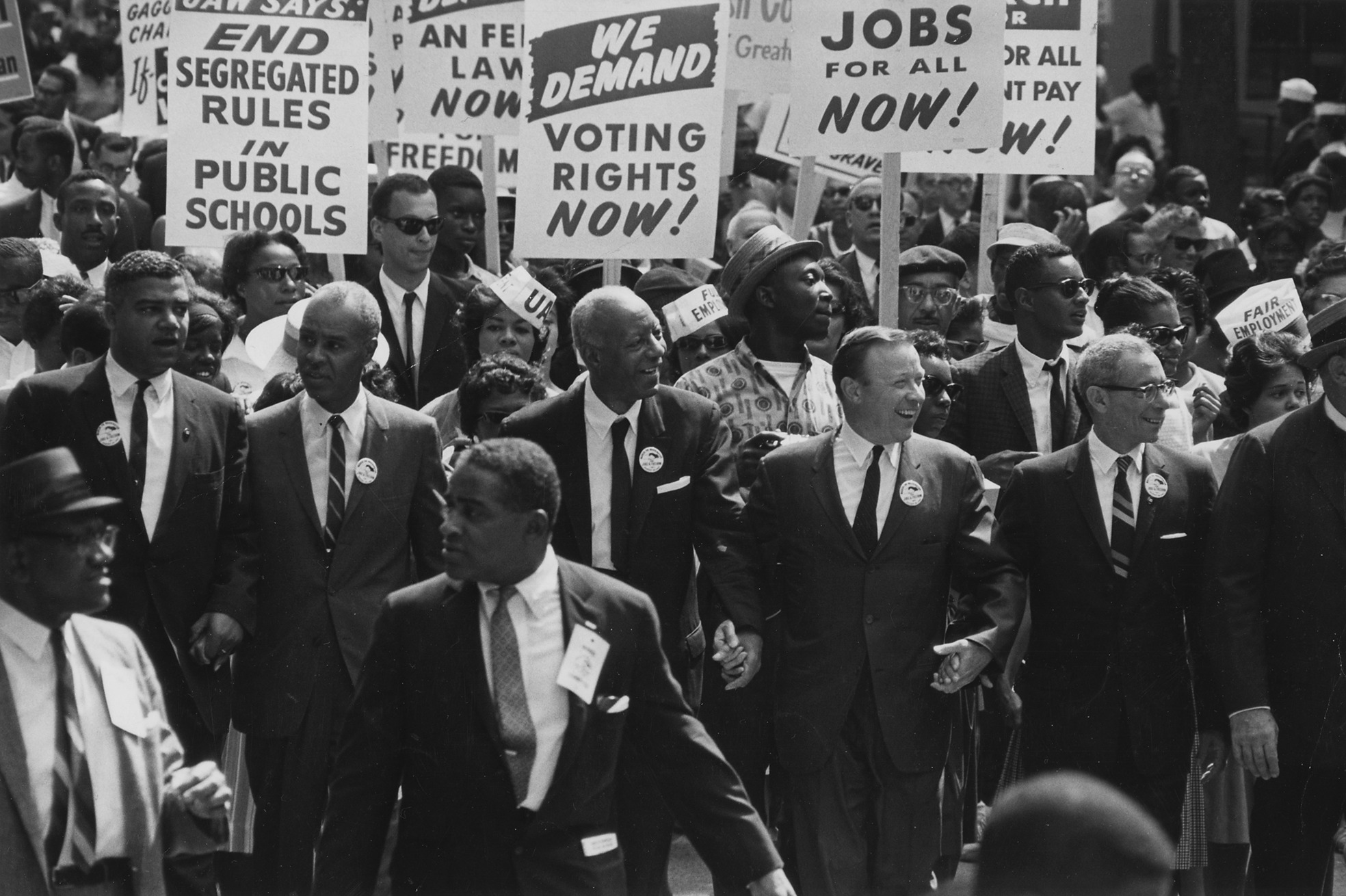
The Civil Rights movement in the United States

A people's history, or history from below, is a type of historical narrative which attempts to account for historical events from the perspective of common people rather than leaders. There is an emphasis on disenfranchised, the oppressed, the poor, the nonconformists, and otherwise marginal groups. Arising in America in response to the development of social history in Europe, authors typically have a Marxist model in mind.

== Origins ==
Georges Lefebvre first used the phrase "histoire vue d'en bas et non d'en haut" (history seen from below and not from above) in 1932 when praising Albert Mathiez for seeking to tell the "histoire des masses et non de vedettes" (history of the masses and not of celebrities). "People's history" was first used in a title in A. L. Morton's 1938 book, A People's History of England. Yet it was E. P. Thompson's 1966 essay, "History from Below", in The Times Literary Supplement that brought the concept to the forefront of historiography. The concept was popularized among non-historians in the U.S. by Howard Zinn's 1980 book, A People's History of the United States. Zinn's People's History marked the rise of the application of social history in scholarship about the U.S.

== Description ==
A people's history is the story of mass movements and outsiders. Individuals absent from previous history writing become a primary focus, including the disenfranchised, the oppressed, the poor, the nonconformists, the subaltern and the otherwise forgotten people. History from below looks at events occurring in the fullness of time, or when an overwhelming wave of smaller events cause certain developments to occur. In contrast to methods that emphasize single great figures in history (referred to as the Great Man theory), history-from-below theory argues that the driving force behind historical change is the daily life of ordinary people, their social status and professions. These are the factors that "push and pull" on opinions and allow for trends to develop, as opposed to extraordinary individuals introducing ideas or initiating events.

In A People's History of the United States, Howard Zinn wrote: "The history of any country, presented as the history of a family, conceals fierce conflicts of interest (sometimes exploding, most often repressed) between conquerors and conquered, masters and slaves, capitalists and workers, dominators and dominated in race and sex. And in such a world of conflict, a world of victims and executioners, it is the job of thinking people, as Albert Camus suggested, not to be on the side of the executioners."

== Criticism ==
Historian Guy Beiner wrote that "the Neo-Marxist flag-bearers of history from below have at times resorted to idealized and insufficiently sophisticated notions of 'the people', unduly ascribing to them innate progressive values. In practice, democratic history is by no means egalitarian".

== See also ==
- Social history
- Canada: A People's History (television documentary series)
- The Assassination of Julius Caesar: A People's History of Ancient Rome
- Montaillou (book)
- George Rudé
- Chris Harman
- Marxist historiography
- New labor history
- Subaltern (postcolonialism)
