= Lynn Hunt =

American historian

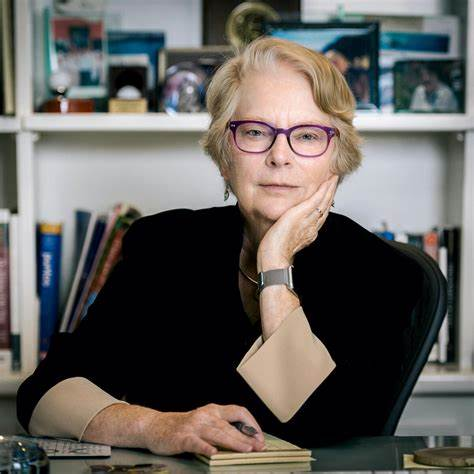
- Born: November 16, 1945 (age 80); Panama
- Education: Carleton College; Stanford University
- Occupation: Historian
- Employer: University of California, Los Angeles
- Notable work: Inventing Human Rights: A History (2007)

Lynn Avery Hunt (born November 16, 1945) is the Eugen Weber Professor of Modern European History at the University of California, Los Angeles (UCLA).

Her area of expertise is the French Revolution, but she is also well known for her work in European cultural history on such topics as gender. Her 2007 work, Inventing Human Rights, has been heralded as the most comprehensive analysis of the history of human rights.

In 2002 she served as president of the American Historical Association.

== Biography ==
Born in Panama and raised in St. Paul, Minnesota, she earned her B.A. degree from Carleton College (1967) and her M.A. (1968) and Ph.D. (1973) from Stanford University. Before coming to UCLA, she taught at the University of California, Berkeley (1974–1987), and the University of Pennsylvania (1987–1998).

Prof. Hunt teaches French and European history and the history of history as an academic discipline. Her specialties include the French Revolution, gender history, cultural history and historiography. Her current research projects include a collaborative study of an early 18th-century work on comparative religion that appeared in seven volumes with 275 engravings by the artist Bernard Picart.

In 1982, Hunt received a Guggenheim Fellowship to study French History.

Hunt was elected to the American Philosophical Society in 2003. In 2014 she was elected a Corresponding Fellow of the British Academy.

== Bibliography ==
=== Books ===
- Revolution and urban politics in provincial France. 1978.
- Politics, Culture, and Class in the French Revolution (1984)
- The New Cultural History: Essays (1989)
- Eroticism and the Body Politic (1991)
- The Family Romance of the French Revolution (1992)
- The Invention of Pornography: Obscenity and the Origins of Modernity, 1500–1800 (1993)
- Telling the Truth about History (1994)
- Histories: French Constructions of the Past (1995)
- The Challenge of the West: Peoples and Cultures from the Stone Age to the Global Age (1995)
- The French Revolution and Human Rights: A Brief Documentary History (1996)
- Beyond the Cultural Turn: New Directions in the Study of Society and Culture (1999)
- Human Rights and Revolutions (2000)
- Liberty, equality, fraternity: exploring the French Revolution [book, CD, and website] (2001)
- The Making of the West: Peoples and Cultures: A Concise History (2005)
- Inventing Human Rights: A History (2007)
- La storia culturale nell'età globale, Pisa: Edizioni ETS, 2010
- Writing History in the Global Era (2014)
- History: Why it Matters (2018)

=== Journal Articles ===
- The Failure of the Liberal Republic in France, 1795–1799: The Road to Brumaire, co-authored with David Lansky and Paul Hanson in The Journal of Modern History, Vol. 51, No. 4, December 1979.
- "Counting Heads" (review of Keith Michael Baker, Jean-Paul Marat: Prophet of Terror, University of Chicago Press, 930 pp.; and Thomas Crow, Murder in the Rue Marat: A Case of Art in Revolution, Princeton University Press, 166 pp.), The New York Review of Books, vol. LXXIII, no. 9 (28 May 2026), pp. 19–20.

=== Book reviews ===
| Year | Review article | Work(s) reviewed |
|---|---|---|
| 2019 | Hunt, Lynn (March 7–20, 2019). "The man who questioned everything". The New York Review of Books. 66 (4): 17–19. | Curran, Andrew S. Diderot and the art of thinking freely.; Zaretsky, Robert. Catherine and Diderot : the Empress, the philosopher, and the Fate of the Enlightenment. |
