= François Bruys =

French writer (1708–1738)

François Bruys (February 7, 1708 – May 20, 1738) was a French writer.

He was born into a Roman Catholic family in Serrières, Province of Burgundy; he later became a Protestant. His Histoire des papes was sometimes printed anonymously. Imperial librarian A. A. Barbier wrote of it: "this wretched book, the fruit of a young man's enthusiasm and anger, is an indigestible collection of all the most satirical things ever written against the leaders of the Roman Church. The incorrect, disjointed and grovelling style is only enhanced by coarse language that could only have pleased the Protestant rabble."

After converting, François Bruys moved to the Netherlands and developed a literary career. He published critiques of Jacques Saurin, another convert who had been a priest and then became a pastor of the Reformed Church of France. He died in Dijon.

In his book on The Art of Knowing Women, "Francois Bruys triumphantly skewers the glaring failure of makeup to mask age and ugliness in women."

== Works ==
- Histoire des papes, La Haye 1732–1734. Five volumes.
- Mémoires Historiques, Critiques et Littéraires; Avec la Vie de L'Auteur et un Catalogue Raisonné de ses Ouvrages.
- L'art de connoitre les femmes, avec une dissertation sur l'adultere. La Haye: Jaques van den Kieboom, 1730.
- The Art of Knowing Women, second English edition, E. Curll and T. Payne, 1732.
