= George Rudé =

British historian

George Frederick Elliot Rudé (8 February 1910 – 8 January 1993) was a British Marxist historian, specializing in the French Revolution and "history from below", especially the importance of crowds in history.

== Early life ==
Born in Oslo, the son of Jens Essendrop Rudé, a Norwegian engineer, and Amy Geraldine Elliot, an English woman educated in Germany, Rudé spent his early years in Norway. After World War I, his family moved to England, where he was educated at Shrewsbury School and Trinity College, Cambridge. A specialist in modern languages, he taught at Stowe and St. Paul's schools. After completing university, Rudé took a trip to the Soviet Union with friends. When he returned he was a "committed Communist and anti-Fascist", despite his family's fairly conservative political views.

== Career ==
In 1935 Rudé joined the British Communist Party. Communism awoke in Rudé an interest in history which he pursued during the 1930s and 1940s attending London University part-time. During this time he taught at the preparatory schools of Stowe and St Paul's. When the war broke out he joined the London Fire Service where he extinguished fires caused by German bombs.

He received his doctorate at the University of London in 1950 for a thesis on crowd action during the French Revolution. He taught modern languages in English secondary schools while publishing. His first book, The Crowd in the French Revolution, soon became a classic.

Rudé was actively involved with the Communist party, an affiliation which caused him many hardships during his life. In 1949, he was relieved of his duties at St Paul's for his communist leanings. He accepted teaching positions at Sir Walter St John's Grammar School for Boys and later at Holloway Comprehensive School. Rudé, making his new academic focus history, and with very little to back his research in Paris of revolutionary France, became a leading British historian of the French Revolution. Rudé contributed to the "history from below" view of history, which is history from the view of the oppressed. He focused especially on those who participated in the riots and rebellions.

He is credited by Eric Hobsbawm as having been the only member of the Communist Party Historians Group to write 18th century history, exploring the chronological "no-man's land between the Group's two most flourishing sections". After writing an article about rioters during the French Revolution, Rudé was awarded the Alexander Prize by the Royal Historical Society in 1956. Rudé wrote and was featured in a number of journals and created a scholarly name for himself under the wing of his mentor, Georges Lefebvre.

Hobsbawm alleged that Rudé's thesis advisor, (Alfred Cobban, a political conservative), blocked any chances Rudé may have had at getting an appointment at a university, but Friguglietti says there is no evidence for that. Shunned in Britain, Rudé looked for opportunities abroad.

In 1959, he was appointed senior lecturer at the University of Adelaide, in the home town of his wife Doreen. He took the opportunity of his time in Australia to research 19th century British and Irish political prisoners transported to Australia as convicts. This later resulted in his book Protest and Punishment: The Story of Social and Political Protesters Transported to Australia, 1788–1868. He was a Foundation Fellow of the Australian Academy of the Humanities in 1969.

Rudé, like most prominent communists in Australia, was put under surveillance by the government's domestic security agency, ASIO. They found little of interest to record. One agent noted: "history books of which he is the author and reports of his class work at schools in England all show that he is objective in his approach to his teaching subject and has not let his own personal politics intrude in any way".

Rudé accepted an offer of a foundation chair of history, at the new University of Stirling, in Scotland, during 1967. However, he fell out with the university administration and returned to Adelaide in 1969, this time as professor of history at Flinders University. In 1970, Rudé moved to Montreal, where he taught at Sir George Williams University, later Concordia University, until he retired in 1987. While at Concordia, he founded the Inter-University Center for European Studies and also taught in the Graduate Programme of Social and Political Thought at York University, Toronto. Rudé was also a visiting professor at the University of Tokyo, Columbia University in New York, and the college of William and Mary in Virginia.

Rudé suffered deteriorating health after the early 1970s and had a brain tumour removed in 1983. After retiring, he returned to England, eventually dying in hospital at Battle on 8 January 1993. His widow Doreen placed his ashes in the garden behind their home in Rye. A tall, handsome and athletic man, he always retained the manners of an English gentleman as well as his left-wing sympathies.

== Influence ==
George Rudé's influence was his emphasis and development of "history from below". Following the new Annales school of thought, Rudé strove to cast off the idea that history was only about nation-states and the men who ruled them. Accompanying Rudé in this shift was the 'new left', liberal historians who, according to Mark Gilderhus, "showed the feasibility of doing history while incorporating attitudes and viewpoints other than those associated with white male elites". Though Rudé was not part of this movement directly, he was firmly allied with their ideas and helped to promote them. He believed, along with the 'new left' that it was the neglected people who could be used to reshape the face of history. The historian James Friguglietti comments that Rudé's work, "displayed sympathy for the lower classes, whether laborers or convicted criminals". By focusing on lower classes Rudé hoped to create a new understanding of history's major events.

Rudé's communist ties shaped his way of perceiving history and opened him up to the idea of looking at the history of protesters. Revolutions were transforming events, and Rudé sought to bring light to why someone would join in such an endeavor. Marxist theory believes that everyone's primary motives for acting are always linked with their material need. Using this frame of reference Rudé places it on the people of the French Revolution and created specific faces in the crowds. He sought to dismantle the myth that the crowd in the revolution is seen as a great evil mass of people bent on destruction of order. As Rudé paints it, "those who took to the streets were ordinary, sober citizens, not half-crazed animals, not criminals". By taking such a view the history of the French revolution was transformed. Common people were suddenly being taken as important historical actors in their own context.

In the decades that Rudé was writing, his new way of looking at history fit well into the social scene. It was the age of liberation, as the oppressive systems that segregated classes, genders, and races were being torn down. People were in need of a new history that included all aspects of society. Writing "history from below", brought in those forgotten yet not unimportant members of history into the narrative. Rudé did this by showing the common people in the revolutions and protests as key players who actively sought to change history. By focusing on such groups, historians have, "inspired new debates over the roles of class, gender, and race in accounting for human divisions and inequalities." In helping bring a voice to prisoners and protesters, George Rudé contributed significantly to the study of history.

Rudé is not without his detractors. From the start, his Marxist view of history made teaching in Great Britain very difficult at the height of Cold War fervour and brought him severe criticism. The main criticism that continues on after his death was that after developing his initial thesis of the crowd in history, he continued using that model in every case to prove his point. Some of Rudé's work became less highly regarded after the collapse of the USSR, but, overall, his contributions to social history and the understanding of protests greatly enhanced how historians look at the past and its actors.

== Works ==
- Revolutionary Europe, 1783-1815, John Wiley & Sons, 2000, ISBN 0-631-22190-5
- The French Revolution, Weidenfeld & Nicolson, 1994, ISBN 1-85799-126-5
- The Crowd in History. A Study of Popular Disturbances in France and England, 1730–1848, New York: Wiley & Sons, 1964. New edition London: Serif, 2005, ISBN 978-1897959473
- The Crowd in the French Revolution. Oxford University Press. 1967. ISBN 978-0195003703.
- Protest and Punishment: Story of the Social and Political Protesters Transported to Australia, 1788-1868, ISBN 0-19-822430-3
- Crime and Victim: Crime and Society in Early Nineteenth-century England, Oxford University Press, 1985, ISBN 0-19-822646-2
- Ideology and Popular Protest, Lawrence & Wishart, 1980, ISBN 0-85315-514-3
- Hanoverian London, 1714-1808, Sutton Publishing, new edition2003, ISBN 0-7509-3333-X
- Europe in the 18th Century: Aristocracy and the Bourgeois Challenge, Orion, 2002, ISBN 1-84212-092-1
- Captain Swing: A Social History of the great English Agricultural Uprising of 1830 (with E. J. Hobsbawm), Penguin Books, 1985, ISBN 0-14-055153-0
- Wilkes and Liberty, London: Lawrence & Wishart, 1983, ISBN 0-85315-579-8
- Foreword to Does Education Matter? by Brian Simon, Lawrence & Wishart, 1985, ISBN 0-85315-635-2
- Robespierre: Portrait of a Revolutionary Democrat, London: Collins, 1975, ISBN 0-00-216708-5
- Debate on Europe, 1815-1850, Harper & Row, 1972, ISBN 0-06-131702-0
- Interpretations of the French Revolution, published for the Historical Association by Routledge and Kegan Paul, 1961
- The French Revolution: Its Causes, Its History and Its Legacy After 200 Years, Grove Press, 1994, ISBN 0-8021-3272-3 / 0-8021-3272-3

George Rudé's historical work focused primarily on the French Revolution and crowd behaviour in France and Great Britain, during the 18th and 19th centuries. Rudé utilizes the method of reporting and analyzing history from the "bottom up," focusing on the people, not the leaders and elites. Rudé's most notable works include The Crowd in the French Revolution; The Crowd in History; Revolutionary Europe: 1783–1815; Ideology and Popular Protest; Paris and London in the Eighteenth Century; Debate on Europe: 1815–1850; and Captain Swing: A Social History of the great English Agricultural Uprising of 1830 (co-authored with Eric Hobsbawm).

One of Rudé's most influential works is The Crowd in History, focusing on 18th and 19th century dissidents and revolutionaries in France and Great Britain. Rudé analyzes the impact and importance of various uprisings between 1730 and 1848. He identifies grain shortages in France and industrialisation in Britain as two recurring catalysts for disturbance. In this work Rudé employs a clear and precise prose style, beginning with specific examples of disturbances in Part 1, and moving on in Part 2 to "a critical analysis of the crowd in its various manifestations". In his introduction Rudé expresses a hope that other historians will be inspired by his new bottoms-up approach to write crowd-centric histories of other eras. He made no secret of his sympathy for the underdog, and this history offers a robust defence of popular uprisings in this period.

In The Crowd in the French Revolution, Rudé examines the historically neglected crowd of the French Revolution. He explains that the Revolution was not only political but more importantly a social upheaval in which the common Frenchmen played a pivotal role in the course and outcome of the Revolution. Most significantly, Rudé analyzes the French crowds in great depth to understand their composition and force on history.

Rudé wrote a broad survey Revolutionary Europe: 1783-1815 in traditional fashion. In it, he portrays France and Europe before, during, and after the French Revolution. He examines the significance of the Revolution in context to the rest of the European world. The broader focus of this work was a shift from his crowd studies, which would resume in his later works.

Rudé's Paris and London in the 18th Century explains the popular protests and revolts of Paris and London during the 18th century. Rudé compares and contrasts the time, place, social, political and economic factors of Paris and London. He examines the pre-industrial stages and the turbulent events that occurred in both European capitals. While this work is not predominately a history from the "bottom up", Rudé does incorporate the impact of each class in Paris and London during the 18th century events.

In Ideology and Popular Protest, Rudé defines the theory behind the ideology of protest beginning with its origins in Marx and Engels. He explains his theory of ideology through various situations in pre-industrial Europe. Rudé also utilizes his explained ideology in the event of the English protests of the 18th and early 19th century and the development of English industrial society, and closing with the possible implications of industry on society.

Rudé, in Debate on Europe: 1815-1850, employs the views and interpretations of other historians to argue the significance of the first half of the 19th century. He examines the rise of national powers, the impacts of the Industrial Revolution, differences of political opinions and the various revolutions throughout Europe during this period. In addition, Rudé inserts his own argument based on the impressive and extraordinary change in Europe during this era as well as inferring at what point this change began.

Captain Swing: A Social History of the great English Agricultural Uprising of 1830 is an example of George Rudé's focus on history "from below" and his study of common folk. In Captain Swing, Rudé examines the people of the 1830 agricultural uprising and the impacts of these events. The focus of this work is on the crowd and its history, revealing a historical interpretation of history from the "bottom up."

== See also ==
- Historiography of the French Revolution
