= Auguste Himly =

French historian and geographer

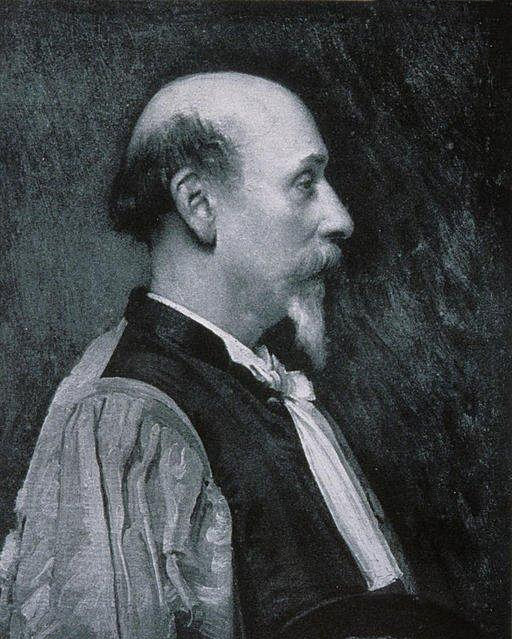
Himly in 1906

Auguste Louis Himly (28 March 1823, Strasbourg, France – 6 October 1906, Sèvres, France) was a French historian and geographer.

After studying in his native town and taking the university course in Berlin (1842-1843), Himly went to Paris and passed first in the examination for fellowship (agrégation) of the lycées (1845), first in the examinations on leaving the École des Chartes, and first in the examination for fellowship of the faculties (1849). In 1849 he took the degree of doctor of letters with two theses, one of which, Wala et Louis le Débonnaire (published in Paris in 1849), placed him in the front rank of French scholars in the province of Carolingian history.

Soon, however, Himly turned his attention to the study of geography. In 1858 he obtained an appointment at the Sorbonne as a teacher of geography, henceforth devoting himself to that subject. It was not until 1876 that he published, in two volumes, his remarkable Histoire de la formation territoriale des États de l'Europe centrale, in which he showed with a firm touch the reciprocal influence exerted by geography and history. While the work gives evidence throughout of wide and well-directed research, he preferred to write it in the form of a student's manual, but it was a manual so original that it gained him admission to the Institute in 1881. In that year he was appointed dean of the faculty of letters, and for ten years he directed the intellectual life of that great educational centre during its development into a great scientific body.
