= Augustin Cochin (historian) =

French historian (1876–1916)

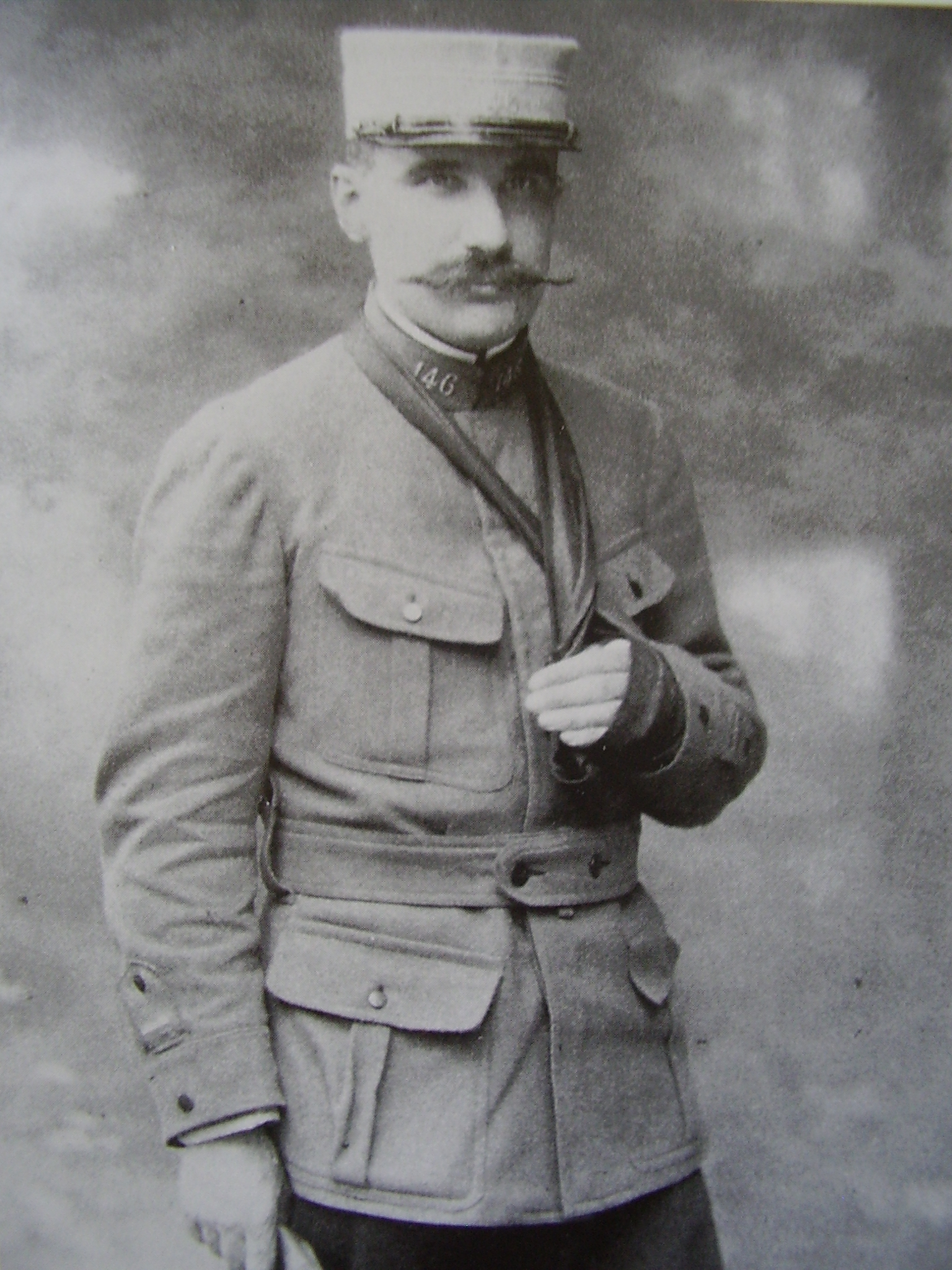
- Born: Augustin Denis Marie Cochin; 22 December 1876; Paris, France
- Died: 8 July 1916 (aged 39); Maricourt, Somme, France
- Cause of death: Killed in action
- Occupation: Historian

Augustin Denis Marie Cochin (22 December 1876 – 8 July 1916) was a French historian of the French Revolution. Much of his work was posthumously published in an incomplete state after he was killed in action in World War I.

== Career overview ==
Born in Paris, Cochin was the son of Denys Cochin, a Parisian deputy in the National Assembly with ties to the Vatican, and the grandson of Augustin Cochin, a French politician and writer. His Catholic upbringing helped him to remain detached from the French Revolution and study it historically in a new light.

Cochin studied the Revolution from a sociological perspective, cultivated from his interest in the work of Émile Durkheim, and he sought to look at the revolution from a social perspective. François Furet believed that Cochin's work worked towards an analysis of two objectives: “a sociology of the production and role of democratic ideology, and a sociology of political manipulation and machines.”

Cochin was drafted into service in World War I in 1914, and he was wounded four times in service before being killed on 8 July 1916 at Maricourt, Somme.

His sometime collaborator, Charles Charpentier, worked with Cochin's family towards posthumous publication of his works.

== See also ==
- Hippolyte Taine
- Jacques Godechot
- Pierre Gaxotte

== Major works ==
- La Crise de l’Histoire Révolutionnaire: Taine et M. Aulard, Honoré Champion, 1909.
- Le Capitaine Augustin Cochin. Quelques Lettres de Guerre, (Préface de Paul Bourget), Bloud & Gay, 1917.
- Les Sociétés de Pensée et la Démocratie: Études d’Histoire Révolutionnaire, Plon-Nourrit et Cie., 1921.
- La Révolution et la Libre Pensée: la Socialisation de la Pensée (1759-1789); la Socialisation de la Personne (1789-1792); la Socialisation des Biens (1793-1794), Plon, 1924.
- Les Sociétés de Pensée et la Révolution en Bretagne (1788-1789), Champion, 1925.
- Les Actes du Gouvernement Révolutionnaire (23 août 1793 – 27 juillet 1794), 3 Vol., A. Picard et Fils, 1920-1935.
- Abstraction Révolutionnaire et Réalisme Catholique, Desclée, de Brouwer & Cie., 1936.
- L'Esprit du Jacobinisme: une Interprétation Sociologique de la Révolution Française, Presses Universitaires de France, 1979.

=== Works in English translation ===
- "The Subversive Influence of the Philosophes and the Sociétés de Pensée." In: William F. Church (ed.), The Influence of the Enlightenment on the French Revolution. Boston: D. C. Heath and Company, 1964, pp. 61–67.
- Organizing the Revolution: Selections from Augustin Cochin, Chronicles Press/The Rockford Institute, 2007.

== External ==
- Works by or about Augustin Cochin at the Internet Archive
- Works by Augustin Cochin, at HathiTrust
- La Révolution et la Libre-Pensée (pdf).
- Les Sociétés de Pensée et la Démocratie Moderne (pdf).
