= François Furet =

French historian

- Born: 27 March 1927; Paris, France
- Died: 12 July 1997 (aged 70); Figeac, France
- Known for: Historian of the French Revolution

Academic background
- Education: University of Paris

François Furet (French: [fʁɑ̃swa fyʁɛ]; 27 March 1927 – 12 July 1997) was a French historian and president of the Saint-Simon Foundation, best known for his books on the French Revolution. From 1985 to 1997, Furet was a professor of French history at the University of Chicago.

Furet was elected to the Académie française in March 1997, just three months before he died in July.

== Biography ==
Born in Paris on 27 March 1927 into a wealthy family, Furet was a bright student who graduated from the Sorbonne with the highest honors and soon decided on a life of research, teaching and writing. He received his education at the Lycée Janson de Sailly and at the faculty of art and law of Paris. In 1949, Furet entered the French Communist Party, but he left the party in 1956 following the Soviet invasion of Hungary. After beginning his studies at the University of Letters and Law in his native Paris, Furet was forced to leave university in 1950 due to a case of tuberculosis. After recovering, he sat for the agrégation and passed the highly competitive exams with a focus in History in 1954. After a stint teaching in high schools, he began work on the French Revolution at the National Center of Scientific Research (CNRS) in France, supporting himself with a journalist job at the France Observateur between 1956 and 1964 and Nouvel Observateur between 1964 and 1966. In 1966, Furet began work at the École des hautes études en sciences sociales (EHESS) in Paris, where he would later be president (from 1977 to 1985). Furet served as Director of Studies at the EHESS in Paris and as a professor in the Committee on Social Thought at the University of Chicago. In March 1997, he was elected to the Académie française. He died in July 1997 in a Toulouse hospital while being treated for head injuries he incurred in an accident on a tennis court. He was survived by his wife Deborah, daughter Charlotte and son Antoine from a previous marriage to Jacqueline Nora. There is now a François Furet school in the suburbs of Paris as well as a François Furet prize given out every year.

Furet's major interest was the French Revolution. Furet's early work was a social history of the 18th century bourgeoisie, but after 1961 his focus shifted to the Revolution. While initially a Marxist and supporter of the Annales School, he later separated himself from the Annales and undertook a critical re-evaluation of the way the French Revolution is interpreted by Marxist historians. He became the leader of the revisionist school of historians who challenged the Marxist account of the French Revolution as a form of class struggle. As other French historians of his generation like Jacques Godechot or Emmanuel Le Roy Ladurie, Furet was open to ideas of English language historians, especially Alfred Cobban. Likewise, Furet frequently lectured at American universities and from 1985 onwards taught at the University of Chicago. In his first work on the Revolution, 1966's La Révolution, Furet argued that the early years of the Revolution had a benign character, but after 1792 the Revolution had skidded off into the blood lust and cruelty of the Reign of Terror. The cause of the Revolution going off course was the outbreak of war in 1792 which Furet controversially argued was intrinsic to the Revolution itself, rather than being an unrelated event as most French historians had argued until then.

The other major theme of Furet's writings was its focus on the political history of the Revolution and its relative lack of interest in the Revolution's social and economic history. Other than a study of Lire et écrire (1977), a study co-edited with Jacques Ozouf concerning the growth of literacy in 18th century France, Furet's writings on the Revolution tended to focus on its historiography. In a 1970 article in Annales, Furet attacked "the revolutionary catechism" of Marxist historians. Furet was especially critical of the "Marxist line" of Albert Soboul which Furet maintained was actually more Jacobin than Marxist. Furet argued that Karl Marx was not especially interested in the Revolution and that most of the views credited to him were really the recycling of Jacobinism.

Furet considered Bolshevism and fascism totalitarian twins in terms of violence and repression.

From 1995 until his death on 12 July 1997 in Figeac, Furet's views about totalitarianism led to a debate via a series of letters with the German philosopher Ernst Nolte. The debate had been started by a footnote in Furet's Le passé d'une illusion criticising Nolte's views over the relationship between Bolshevism and fascism, leading Nolte to write a letter of protest. Furet defended his view about totalitarian twins sharing the same origins while Nolte argued that fascism was a response to Bolshevism.

The Parisian newspaper Le Figaro called him "a revolutionary of the Revolution". According to the newspaper, "One could even say that there is a Furetian school (of the Revolution)," with a "galaxy" of professors and writers, influenced by Furet, living in France, the United States and the United Kingdom.

Furet was a member of both the American Academy of Arts and Sciences and the American Philosophical Society.

== French Revolution ==
Furet was the leading figure in the rejection of the classic or Marxist interpretation. Desan (2000) concluded he "seemed to emerge the victor from the bicentennial, both in the media and in historiographic debates".

Furet, an ex-French Communist Party member, published his classic La Révolution Française in 1965–1966. It marked his transition from revolutionary left-wing politics to moderate centre-left position and reflected his ties to the social-science-oriented Annales School.

Furet then re-examined the Revolution from the perspective of 20th-century totalitarianism as exemplified by Adolf Hitler and Joseph Stalin. His Penser la Révolution Française (1978), translated as Interpreting the French Revolution (1981), was a breakthrough book that led many intellectuals to reevaluate Bolshevism and the Revolution as inherently totalitarian and anti-democratic. Looking at modern French communism, he stressed the close resemblance between the 1960s and 1790s, with both favoring the inflexible and rote ideological discourse in party cells where decisions were made unanimously in a manipulated direct democracy. Furet further suggested that popularity of the far left to many French intellectuals was itself a result of their commitment to the ideals of the Revolution. Furet set about to imagine the Revolution less as the result of social and class conflict and more a conflict over the meaning and application of egalitarian and democratic ideas. He saw Revolutionary France as located ideologically between two revolutions, namely the first egalitarian one that began in 1789 and the second the authoritarian coup that brought about Napoleon's empire in 1799. The egalitarian origins of the Revolution were not undone by the Empire and were resurrected in the July Revolution of 1830, the 1848 Revolution and the Commune of Paris in 1871.

Working much of the year at the University of Chicago after 1979, Furet also rejected the Annales School with its emphasis on very long-term structural factors and emphasized intellectual history. Influenced by Alexis de Tocqueville and Augustin Cochin, Furet argues that Frenchmen must stop seeing the Revolution as the key to all aspects of modern French history. His works include Interpreting the French Revolution (1981), a historiographical overview of what has preceded him and A Critical Dictionary of the French Revolution (1989).

For his influence in history and historiography, Furet was awarded:

- Tocqueville Award, 1990
- The European Award for Social Sciences, 1996
- The Hannah Arendt Award for Political Thought, 1996
- An honorary diploma (Honoris Causa) from Harvard University

== Methodology ==
Furet's concerns were not only historical, but historiographical as well. He attempted particularly to address distinctions between history as grand narrative and history as a set of problems that must be dealt with in a purely chronological manner.

== Bibliography ==
- La Révolution française, en collaboration avec Denis Richet (The French Revolution, 2 volumes, 1965)
- Penser la Révolution française (Interpreting the French Revolution, 1978)
- L'atelier de l'histoire (In the Workshop of History, 1982)
- "Beyond the Annales", The Journal of Modern History Vol. 55, No. 3, September 1983 in JSTOR
- "Terrorism and Democracy". Telos 65 (Fall 1985). New York: Telos Press
- Marx and the French Revolution with Lucien Calvié, (University of Chicago Press, 1988)
- "The Monarchy and the Procedures for the Elections of 1789", The Journal of Modern History Vol. 60, No. 3, September 1988 in JSTOR
- "The French Revolution Revisited" Government and Opposition (1989) 24#3 pp: 264–282. online
- Dictionnaire critique de la Révolution française (coedited with Mona Ozouf, 1992, 2 vol.)
  - A Critical Dictionary of the French Revolution (Harvard U.P. 1989)
- Le Siècle de l'avènement républicain (with Mona Ozouf, 1993)
- Le Passé d'une illusion, essai sur l'idée communiste au XXe siècle (1995)
  - The Passing of an Illusion: The Idea of Communism in the Twentieth Century, (translated by Deborah Furet, University of Chicago Press, 1999). ISBN 0-226-27341-5
- co-written with Ernst Nolte Fascisme et Communisme: échange épistolaire avec l'historien allemand Ernst Nolte prolongeant la Historikerstreit, translated into English by Katherine Golsan as Fascism and Communism, with a preface by Tzvetan Todorov, Lincoln, Nebraska: University of Nebraska Press, 2001, ISBN 0-8032-1995-4.
- La Révolution, Histoire de France
  - Revolutionary France, 1770–1880 (translated by Antonia Nevill) (Oxford U.P., 1995).
- Reading and Writing: Literacy in France from Calvin to Jules Ferry
- Lies, Passions, and Illusions: The Democratic Imagination in the Twentieth Century, (translated by Deborah Furet, University of Chicago Press, 2014). ISBN 978-0-226-11449-1
