= Albert Mathiez =

French historian

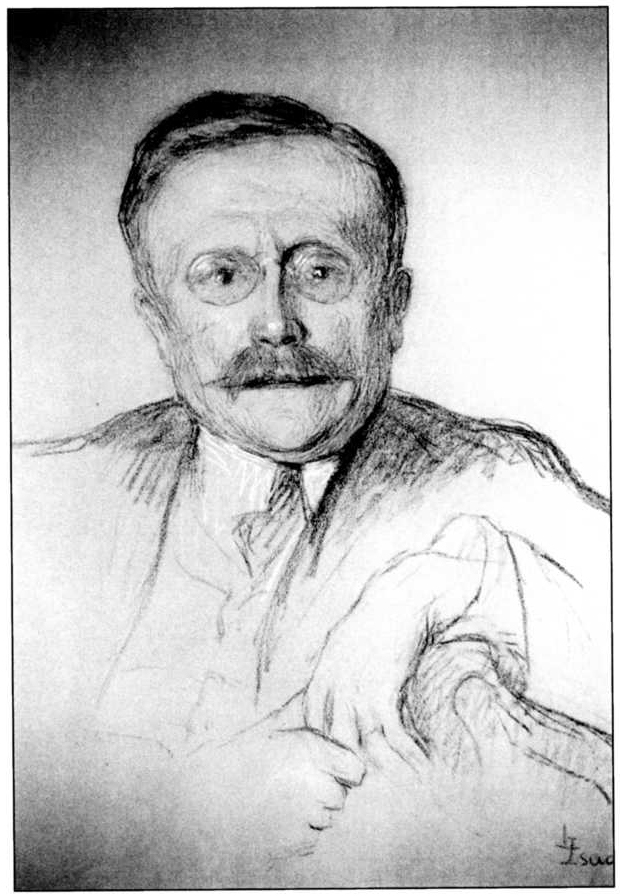
- Born: Albert-Xavier-Émile Mathiez; 10 January 1874; La Bruyère, Haute-Saône, France
- Died: 25 February 1932 (aged 58); Paris, France
- Occupation: Historian

Albert-Xavier-Émile Mathiez (French pronunciation: [albɛʁ ɡzavje emil matje]; 10 January 1874 – 26 February 1932) was a French historian, best known for his Marxist interpretation of the French Revolution. Mathiez emphasized class conflict. He argued that 1789 pitted the bourgeoisie against the aristocracy and then the Revolution pitted the bourgeoisie against the sans-culottes, who were a proletariat-in-the-making. Mathiez greatly influenced Georges Lefebvre and Albert Soboul in forming what came to be known as the orthodox Marxist interpretation of the Revolution. Mathiez admired Maximilien Robespierre, praised the Reign of Terror and did not extend complete sympathy to the struggle of the proletariat.

== Career ==
Mathiez came from a peasant family in Eastern France, being born in La Bruyère, Haute-Saône. He showed high intelligence as a young student, with a strong interest in history. He entered the École Normale Supérieure in 1894, by which time he had already displayed a strong anti-clerical bias. After graduation, he passed the aggregation in history and after doing his military service entered the teaching profession. He taught at a variety of local lycèes until he completed his doctorate which he wrote under the direction of François Victor Alphonse Aulard, then the leading historian of the Revolution, who admired Georges Danton. Mathiez was greatly influenced by Jean Jaurès, who propounded a more radical economic and social interpretation. At first a good friend of Aulard, he broke with his mentor in 1907, founding his own society, the Société des études robespierristes, with its journal, the Annales révolutionnaires. He also moved up from the lycée to the university level, teaching at Besançon and Dijon.

Earlier a pacifist, Mathiez developed into a nationalistic Jacobin after the World War I erupted in 1914. He used his scholarship on the Revolution to demonstrate that just as Revolutionary France had defeated the allied coalition in the 1790s, so too the Third Republic would triumph over Imperial Germany. With its serious economic and social stresses such as shortages of food and rationing, the war prompted him to study similar conditions during the Revolution. The eventual result was one of his most original works, La Vie chère et le movement social sous la Terreur (1927).

In his masterwork La Révolution française (3 vol. 1922–1924), Mathiez boldly made Maximilien Robespierre the hero. Émile Durkheim's work in the sociology of religion influenced his interpretation of the 1790s.

Mathiez saw the French Revolution as the critical first stage in a proletarian advance that would gather strength in the revolutions of 1848, the Paris Commune of 1871 and the Russian revolts of 1905 and reached its highest point during the 1917 Bolshevik Revolution in Russia which created a dictatorship in the name of the proletariat.

Mathiez rejected the common view of Robespierre as demagogic, dictatorial and fanatical. Mathiez argued he was an eloquent spokesman for the poor and oppressed, an enemy of royalist intrigues, a vigilant adversary of dishonest and corrupt politicians, a guardian of the French Republic, an intrepid leader of the French Revolutionary government and a prophet of a socially responsible state.

Mathiez held the highly prestigious Sorbonne chair in French Revolutionary Studies and was the founder of the Societe des Etudes Robespierristes which led to the creation in 1908 of the highly regarded journal Annales révolutionnaries that became Annales historiques de la Révolution française in 1924.

Mathiez was active in the French Communist Party from 1920 but resigned in 1922. He joined the Socialist Communist Union but left it shortly after, becoming closer to the SFIO and supporting the Cartel des Gauches. By 1930, he was attacked by Stalinist historians, who condemned Mathiez and his Jacobinism as adversaries of the proletarian revolution. He was a vigorous polemicist. In his own defense after 1930, he mounted a sharp critique of his detractors.

On February 26, 1932, he suffered a cerebral hemorrhage in the presence of his students, in the Michelet amphitheater of the Sorbonne; quickly hospitalized, he died in the evening without having regained consciousness.

A commemorative plaque in his likeness is still to this day in the amphitheater of the Sorbonne.
