= François Victor Alphonse Aulard =

French historian (1849–1928)

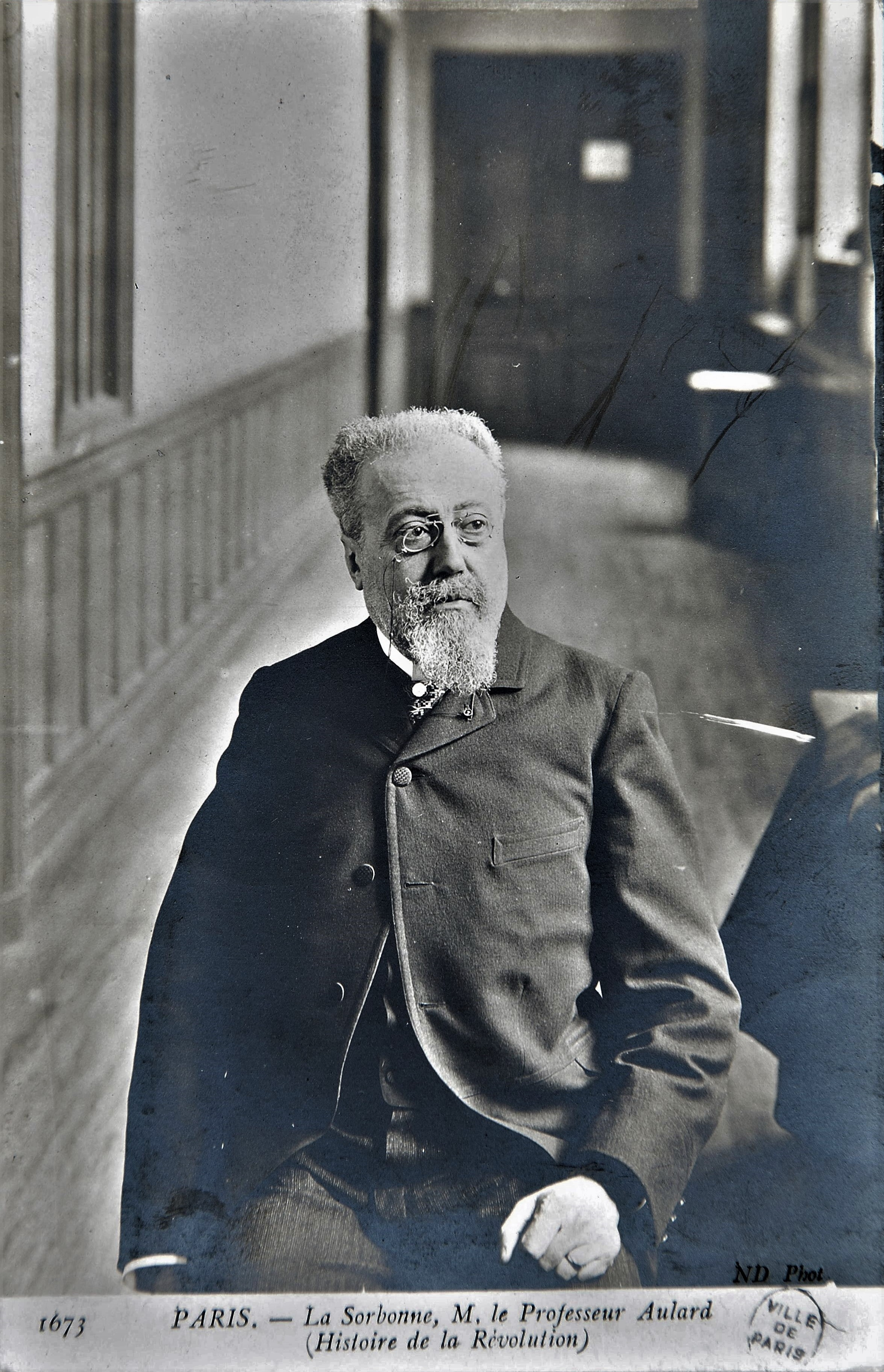
- Born: 19 July 1849; Montbron, Charente, France
- Died: 23 October 1928 (aged 79); Paris, France
- Education: École Normale Supérieure
- Occupation: Historian
- Known for: Historiography of French Revolution and Napoleon
- Notable work: Les orateurs de la Constituante (1882), Les orateurs de la Législative et de la Convention (1885)

François Victor Alphonse Aulard (19 July 1849 – 23 October 1928) was the first professional French historian of the French Revolution and of Napoleon. His major achievement was to institutionalise and professionalise the practice of history in France.

== Career ==
Aulard was born at Montbron in Charente. He entered the École Normale Supérieure in 1867 and obtained the degree of doctor of letters in 1877 with a thesis in Latin on Gaius Asinius Pollio and a French one on Giacomo Leopardi (whose works he subsequently translated into French). Moving from literature to history, he made a study of parliamentary oratory during the French Revolution and published two volumes on Les orateurs de la Constituante (1882) and on Les orateurs de la Legislative et de la Convention (1885). With these works, he established a reputation as a careful scholar well versed in the primary sources of the French Revolution.

Appointed professor of the history of the French Revolution at the Sorbonne in 1885, he formed the minds of students who in their turn did valuable work. Nonetheless his views were seen as controversial and "advanced" in a society still under the long influence of the French Revolution. During his course on the Revolution at the Sorbonne in May 1893 violent fist fights broke out. At the exit rival gangs yelled at each other "Down with Aulard" and, in opposition to a Roman Catholic clergy identified with the Ancien Régime, "Down with the skullcap".

Peter Kropotkin, the Russian Anarchist, wrote in 1909 that Aulard and the Société de la Revolution française "have shed a flood of light upon the acts of the Revolution, on its political aspects, and on the struggles for supremacy that took place between the various parties. But the study of the economic side of the Revolution is still before us..."

== Work ==
For the French Revolution, Aulard concentrated on archival research, and published on the political and administrative history of the period. His major work was the Histoire politique de la Revolution française (4 vol, 3rd ed. 1901). He championed Georges Danton as opposed to Maximilien Robespierre, seeing in Danton the spirit of the embattled Revolution and the national defense against foreign enemies.

He was known to have argued:

"From the social point of view, the Revolution consisted in the suppression of what was called the feudal system, in the emancipation of the individual, in greater division of landed property, the abolition of the privileges of noble birth, the establishment of equality, the simplification of life. [...] The French Revolution differed from other revolutions in being not merely national, for it aimed at benefiting all humanity."

Aulard divided the French Revolution into "four epochs: 1789- 1792, during which democratic and republican parties were formed under a constitutional monarchy; 1792-1795, during which a democratic republic existed; 1795-1799, the period of the bourgeois republic; and 1799-1804, that of the plebiscitary republic."

== Editor ==
To him, we owe the Recueil des actes du Comité de salut public (27 vols. 1889–1923); La Société des Jacobins: Recueil de documents sur l'histoire des club des Jacobins de Paris (6 vols., 1889–1897); and Paris pendant la reaction thermidorienne et sous le directoire: Recueil de documents pour l'histoire de l'esprit public a Paris (5 vols., 1898–1902) which was followed by a collection on Paris sous le consulat (2 vols., 1903–1904).

For the Société de l'Histoire de la Revolution Française which brought under his editorship the important periodical entitled La Revolution française, he produced the Registre des libérations du consulat provisoire (1894) and L'Etat de la France en l'an VIII et en l'an IX, with the reports of the effects (1897), besides editing various works or memoirs written by men of the Revolution such as Jacques-Charles Bailleul, Pierre Gaspard Chaumette, Claude Fournier (called the American), Hérault de Séchelles and Louvet de Couvrai.

These large collections of documents were a fraction of his output. He wrote a number of articles which were collected in volumes under the title Etudes et leçons sur la Révolution française (9 vols., 1893–1924). In a volume entitled Taine, historien de la Révolution française (1908), Aulard attacked the method of the eminent philosopher in criticism that was severe, perhaps unjust, but certainly well-informed. This was, as it were, the manifesto of the new school of criticism applied to the political and social history of the Revolution (see Les Annales révolutionnaires, June 1908).

== Positivism ==
Aulard's historiography was based on positivism. The assumption was that methodology was all-important and the historian's duty was to present in chronological order the duly verified facts to analyze relations between facts and provide the most likely interpretation. Full documentation based on research in the primary sources was essential. He took the lead in the publication very important documents and in training advanced students in the proper use and analysis of primary sources. Aulard's famous four volume history of the Revolution focused on parliamentary debates, not action in the street; and in institutions, not insurrections. He emphasized public opinion, elections, parties, parliamentary majorities and legislation. He recognized the complications that prevented the Revolution from fulfilling all its ideal promises as when the legislators of 1793 made a suffrage universal for all men, but also established the dictatorship of the Reign of Terror.

== Criticism ==
Aulard remains controversial because of his political positions. His place in historiography remains contested. His history was a series of narrow studies of constitutional, institutional and political developments in stark contrast with the wide-ranging imagination of his leading student Albert Mathiez. Conservatives argue that Aulard's anti-clerical and radical-republican position skewed his research findings. On the other hand, his professionalism and fidelity to sources inspired a generation of scholars. He built a neo-Jacobin legacy with attention more to raison d'état than to party division. He championed international liberal democracy and human rights.

== Bibliography ==
- Aulard, François-Alphonse. The French Revolution, a Political History, 1789–1804 (4 vol. 1910); volume 1 1789–1792 online; Volume 2 1792–95 online
