= Georges Lefebvre =

French historian (1874 – 1959)

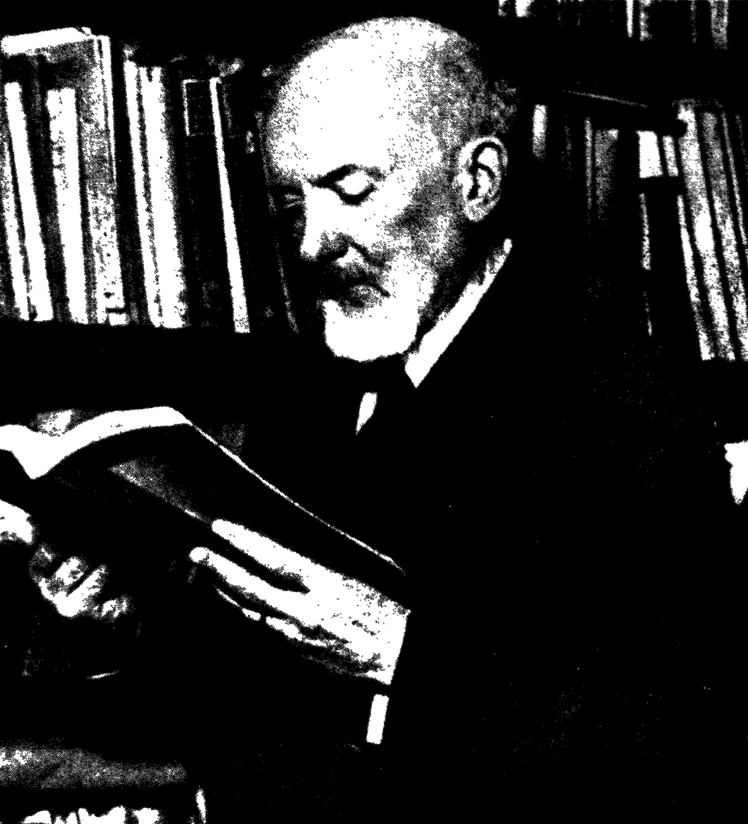
Georges Lefebvre

Georges Lefebvre (French: [ʒɔʁʒ ləfɛvʁ]; 6 August 1874 – 28 August 1959) was a French historian, best known for his work on the French Revolution and peasant life. He is considered one of the pioneers of "history from below". He coined the phrase the "death certificate of the old order" to describe the Great Fear of 1789. Among his most significant works was the 1924 book Les Paysans du Nord pendant la Révolution française ("The Peasants of the North During the French Revolution"), which was the result of 20 years of research into the role of the peasantry during the revolutionary period.

== Personal background ==
Lefebvre was born in Lille to a family of modest means. He attended public school, obtaining his secondary and university training with the help of scholarships. Lefebvre attended the University of Lille, and it was here that he followed the "special curriculum", which emphasized modern languages, mathematics, and economics instead of the classical languages. It was as a result of his schooling that Georges Lefebvre was able to teach in a series of secondary schools for more than twenty years after his graduation in 1898. After his career in teaching secondary school students, Lefebvre began teaching at the university level.

He became more and more influenced by Marxism around the time of the Second World War, especially by the Marxist idea that history should be concerned with economic structures and class relations.

He was married twice.

He died in Paris in 1959.

== The French Revolution ==
Lefebvre began writing in 1904, but it was not until 1924, at the age of fifty, that he was finally at the point in his career - no longer preoccupied with supporting his family - that he was able to finish his doctoral thesis: Les Paysans du Nord pendant la Révolution française. This work was a detailed and thorough examination of the effects of the French Revolution on the countryside. Lefebvre's work on this thesis was "based on a thorough analysis of thousands of tax rolls, notarial records, and the registers of rural municipalities, whose materials he used to trace the effects of the abolition of feudalism and ecclesiastical tithes, the consequences of property transfers, the movement of the bourgeoisie into the countryside, and the destruction of collective rights in the peasants villages".

He often wrote from a viewpoint which he felt the peasant of the time would have held. His "the Coming of the French Revolution" identified four key champions: the aristocracy (which prevented monarchical reform), the bourgeoisie, the urban revolution (storming the Bastille), and the peasant revolution.

Fellow historians tend to examine the last 35 years of Lefebvre's writings (1924–1959). This period is chosen because it is when he wrote his most influential and "much more complex interpretation of the Revolution than had hitherto prevailed amongst historians". Peter Jones elaborates that Lefebvre's take on the Revolution has three major emphases: the idea that the countryside peasantry actively participated in the Revolution, the idea that this participation was not significantly influenced by the bourgeoisie, and the idea that the peasants largely agreed on an anticapitalist way of thinking in the 1790s.

== Accomplishments ==
Lefebvre's account of the origins of the French Revolution was written in his book, Quatre-Vingt-Neuf (translated as The Coming of the French Revolution), which was published in 1939 to mark the sesquicentennial of the events of 1789. However, the Vichy government that took over the following year wanted no left-wing history or sympathetic understanding of the Revolution, as they drew their support from the anti-republican right. The Vichy régime suppressed the book, ordering 8,000 copies to be burned; as a result, the work was virtually unknown in its native land until it was reprinted in 1970. Its reputation was already secure in the English-speaking world, however, since the English translation, The Coming of the French Revolution (1939), had established it as a clear, yet subtle, classic. It remains the definitive explanation of the Marxist interpretation of the causes of the Revolution. Crane Brinton, in The Nation, wrote of it, "...simply the best introduction to the study of the French Revolution available anywhere." His seminal work, La Révolution Française (revised edition, 1951) was translated into English as two volumes: The French Revolution From Its Origins To 1793 (1962-4) and The French Revolution from 1793 to 1799 (1964). He also wrote a highly regarded study of Napoléon (4th edition 1953; translated in 2 volumes, 1969).

A doctoral dissertation by Lawrence Davis, entitled Georges Lefebvre: Historian and Public Intellectual, 1928-1959, as the title suggests, concentrates on the latter part of Lefebvre's life and on the scholarly publications that made Lefebvre a noteworthy historian. Davis expands on the concept of mentalité that Lefebvre developed, arguing that this is "a term that represented their collective goal of documenting the material and mental worlds of people of the past, where the social and cultural existed comfortably side by side". Throughout the work, Davis stressed the notion that Lefebvre used this concept of mentalité of the peasantry to explain the Revolution.

== Recognition ==
In 1935, Georges Lefebvre became the president of the Societé des Études Robespierristes and the director of the Annales historiques de la Révolution française. In 1937, Lefebvre was named the Chair of the History of the French Revolution at the Sorbonne.

By 1914 he had already published a collection of documents, entitled Documents relatifs à l’histoire des subsistances dans le district de Bergues pendant la Révolution (1788-An V). Lefebvre continued to engrave all that he could on the French Revolution and all that dealt with it, well into his old age and beyond his retirement from the position of chair at the Sorbonne in 1945. Georges Lefebvre died in Boulogne-Billancourt on August 28, 1959.

== Selected works ==
- Les Paysans du Nord pendant la Révolution Française (1924)
- La Grande Peur de 1789 (1932), translated by Joan White as The Great Fear of 1789: Rural Panic in Revolutionary France (Pantheon, 1973).
- Les Thermidoriens (1937).
- Le Directoire (1946).
- The Thermidorians and the Directory: Two Phases of the French Revolution, translated by Robert Baldick (Random House, 1964).
- Quatre-vingt-neuf (1939) (published under the auspices of the Institute for the History of the French Revolution, University of Paris, in conjunction with the National Committee for the Celebration of the 150th Anniversary of the French Revolution), translated by R. R. Palmer as The Coming of the French Revolution (Princeton University Press, 1947; bicentennial edition, 1989).
- Napoléon (1935); Volume I translated by Henry F. Stockhold as Napoleon: From 18 Brumaire to Tilsit, 1799-1807 and Volume II translated by J. E. Anderson as Napoleon: From Tilsit to Waterloo, 1807-1815 (Columbia University Press, 1969); those translations published in one volume as Napoleon (Routledge, 2011).
- La Révolution Française (1951).
- La Révolution Française 2nd edition (1957), published in English in two parts as The French Revolution: From Its Origins to 1793 (Columbia University Press, 1962) translated by Elizabeth Moss Evanson, and The French Revolution: From 1793 to 1799 (Columbia University Press, 1964) translated by John Hall Stewart and James Friguglietti.

== See also ==
- Historiography of the French Revolution

== Sources ==
- Bienvenu, Richard T. (2008). "Lefebvre, Georges". Encyclopedia Americana. Grolier Online. 16 Feb. 2008
- Davis, Lawrence H. (2001). Georges Lefebvre: Historian and Public Intellectual, 1928-1959. Ann Arbor: Diss. University of Connecticut.
- Evanson, Elizabeth M. Foreword. The French Revolution Volume I from its origins to 1793. By Georges Lefebvre. New York: Columbia University Press, 1962. ix-xiv
- Jones, Peter M. (Spring 1990). "Georges Lefebvre and the Peasant Revolution: Fifty Years on". French Historical Studies. 16 (3). Fairfax: JSTOR. George Mason U. Lib.: 645–663. doi:10.2307/286492. JSTOR 286492.
- Root, Hilton L. "The Case Against Georges Lefebvre's Peasant Revolution", History Workshop (1989) 28 pp 88–102. Disputed Lefebvre's argument that an independent peasant revolution coexisted within the French Revolution and that it sought a return to a precapitalist, prebourgeois society. Root holds that the rebellious behavior of the peasants was caused by the rise of bureaucracy, not by the introduction of markets or capitalism.in JSTOR See also rebuttal by P. M. Jones, History Workshop (1989), Issue 28, pp 103–106 in JSTOR; Root's final response in JSTOR
