= Les Cahiers du GRIF =

Belgian, French-language feminist magazine

- Cover of the first issue of Les Cahiers du GRIF
- Categories: Feminism; History; Psychology; Sociology
- Frequency: Quarterly
- Founder: Françoise Collin
- Founded: October 1973
- Final issue Number: 1997; 51
- Company: TransÉditions, 1973–1978; Tierce Press, 1982–1994, 1996–7
- Country: Belgium; France
- Based in: Brussels; Paris
- Language: French
- ISSN: 0770-6081 (print); 2262-0753 (web)
- OCLC: 1120656788

Les Cahiers du GRIF was a French language feminist periodical that examined women's views and relationship to the world. It included themes of politics and labor while also examining kinship, love, sexuality, and other matters. Founded in 1973 in Brussels by Françoise Collin, it was one of the first journals of feminist thought published in the French language.

Twenty-four issues were printed in Brussels between 1973 and 1978, with varying topics. The contributors chose to use language that did not insult potential male readers, but the first series did not allow any publication of men's writing.

In 1978, publication stopped while the women involved with Les Cahiers pursued other feminist endeavors, including founding the GRIF-University for Women. In the interim years, GRIF-U published seven newsletters under the title Les Bulletins du GRIF.

In 1982, Collin moved to Paris, taking Les Cahiers with her. A total of forty-eight issues were printed between 1973 and 1994, with three more printed in 1996 and 1997.

During the course of its publication, Les Cahiers organised seminars and helped evaluate the lack of women's studies in Europe, leading to a 1989 conference in Brussels that itself led to the establishment of the GRACE database. A GRIF meeting brought attention to the need for a change in Belgian law with respect to the definition of rape, which happened 4 July 1989. The journal also helped raise awareness of the plight of women in Lebanon in 1990.

== History ==
While visiting New York City in 1972, Collin became exposed to American feminism. In 1973, Collin formed a feminist organization in Brussels called the Feminist Research and Information Group (GRIF). It brought together Jacqueline Aubenas, Marie Denis, Hedwige Peemans-Poullet, Geneviève Simon, Suzanne Van Rokeghem, Jeanne Vercheval, Eliane Boucquey, Marie-Thérèse Cuvelliez, and Marthe Van de Meulebroeke.

Together, the women of GRIF created a new journal, Les Cahiers du GRIF, or The GRIF Notebooks, one of the first journals of feminist thought published in the French language. The first meeting regarding establishment of Les Cahiers occurred in Collin's Brussels basement, with the gathered women funding the endeavor themselves.

The first issue, printed in October 1973, was distributed at the second Women's Day in Belgium, 11 November 1973. The second issue was distributed in both Brussels and at the Paris Maspero bookstore. Les Cahiers quickly gained a reputation of "considerable renown", especially in the Francophonie, drawing readers who may have been offput by the Et ta soeur? (And you sister?) feminist magazine.

Between 1973 and 1978, twenty-four issues of the magazine had been printed in Brussels, with topics that ranged from theory to more practical issues and presented readers with works by women artists. During these years, no men were allowed to participate in any way in the magazine. Due to the publishing group's exhaustion, and overall change in feminism and how the movement was spreading, Les Cahiers was discontinued at the end of 1978.

Though no issues of Les Cahiers were printed between 1978 and 1982, the women involved with it through 1978 were active in other endeavors, including organising seminars which included speakers such as Nicole-Claude Mathieu and Leïla Sebbar. Several women involved with the magazine organised a conference in Wépion from 31 October to 4 November 1979 to continue the spread of feminism, with the goal of one conference per year. They even founded other feminist magazines, such as Voyelles (Vowels) and Chronique féministe (Feminist Chronicles), as well as the GRIF-University for Women. GRIF-U published seven newsletters under the title Les Bulletins du GRIF during these interim years. When GRIF and the university separated in 1982, the Chronique féministe was the official journal of the university.

In 1982, the magazine began printing again, with the second series running through 1994. The Feminist Review announced the new printings in their Summer 1983 issue, giving a Brussels address, though the second printing occurred in Paris. Despite the move, GRIF retained a Brussels location.

The magazine allowed male contributors during the Paris publication years, though very few. The magazine was published by Tierce Press during this period, bringing the total number of issues between both the Brussels and Paris publications to forty-eight. Considered a thematic journal, Les Cahiers outlasted several other Parisian feminist publications of the same genre.

The final series consisted of only three issues, printed in 1996 and 1997.

== Circulation ==
The first issue printed 1,500 copies for sale on 11 November 1973, and the press run sold out that same evening.

Les Cahiers subsequently printed between 1000 and 6000 copies per issue, and rapidly became the Belgian feminist journal with the broadest distribution.

Annual subscriptions initially cost US$13 by land mail and US$17 by air mail. At that time, Les Cahiers distributed its magazine quarterly.

== Content ==
Les Cahiers initially centered on the problems of the status of women, as well as the whole of society. The magazine brought neofeminist thought and analyses to the public. Themes included both professional and household work; politics; language; family; the female body; lesbianism; sexuality; religion; art; and social conflicts, among other topics.

The magazine did include material that appealed to academics, but it also focused on art, books, and films, and included photographs of womens' daily lives. Les Cahiers utilised the personal accounts of its contributors as a vehicle for praxis. It examined broader societal issues from the point of view of women or gender, intent on addressing patriarchical norms while simultaneously finding a means of changing the world at large so that women would no longer be constrained by those limitations. Some articles were annotated in margins which took up one third of each page and aided in encouraging reflection without producing "monolithic thought".

While the publication did welcome international contributions, the editors did not align themselves with radical movements, though there was a distrust of the criminal justice system among the contributing writers. Though the first series did not allow male contributors, it did address itself to all readers, and elected to not use language that denigrated men.

The first issue raised the question "What is feminism for?" and encouraged stating goals that were common among the journal's wide audience. An article by Collin discussed the "cultural character of sex", specifically addressing intersex persons. Les Cahiers addressed the question of home economics being work or not in 1974, providing detailed accounts of the hours and tasks involved in domestic labor. The same issue included an analysis of hours spent in both the home and professional labor spheres. (Note: Prevailing male thought from philosophers such as Luc Boltanski, Michel Foucault, and Louis Althusser considered the housekeeping curriculum as a means of controlling private lives, in the same manner in which professional lives conformed to specific strictures.) The second issue included an account from the 1973 Women's Day debates where Les Cahiers had invited men present to participate in a discussion of "Men and Women", pointing out that feminism must acknowledge that it concerns the whole of society. Collin's commentary noted that the men who spoke were only slightly patronising and offered sympathy rather than the aggressive, ironic questions that had been expected.

The 1976 issue of Les Cahiers titled "Do you speak French?" discussed the issues of how language can be used to enforce male dominance. Directly addressing the structure of the French language with respect to feminism, specifically commenting in regard to the "mute e", Collin asked if women were to be considered nothing more than "mute e"s due to their exclusion. Luce Irigaray's "When our lips speak to one another" examined women's communication with each other verbally and sexually, and Ida Magli's "Power in the speech and silence of women" printed in that issue discussed the women's objectification and subjugation through language. It also included an interview with Maria Antonietta Macciocchi on fascism.

In a departure from other feminist publications of the era, Les Cahiers allowed bylines to be printed, with the margin notes showing the collective had been involved. Among the first series' published writers were Elena Gianini Belotti, Nicole Brossard, Hélène Cixous, Nancy Huston, Julia Kristeva, Louise Vandelac, Agnès Varda, Jacqueline Coutras, Jeanne Fagnini, Françoise d'Eaubonne, Leïla Sebbar, and Frédérique Vinteuil. Authors for the second series included Jutta Brückner, Françoise Héritier, Delphine Seyrig, Barbara Cassin, Monique David-Ménard, Rada Iveković, Françoise Proust, Christine Planté, Michèle Riot-Sarcey, and Eleni Varikas. Among the male authors printed in this series was Claude Javeau, discussing the writings of Georg Simmel.

Les Cahiers included feminist writings from such authors as Gertrude Stein. It was also instrumental in the spread of Hannah Arendt's works, translated into French.

== Composition ==
The core editorial committee consisted of five women: Aubenas, Boucquey, Collin, Cuvelliez, and Peemans-Poullet. Beginning after the publication of the fourth issue in October 1974, meetings to discuss the articles for the next issue's publication were held at the Women's House in Brussels and included around ten women on average, sometimes more if that issue's themes required it. The women involved did not all subscribe to the same feminist ideologies, nor were they necessarily of the same socio-economic background. As a result, being able to speak freely was a necessity. Those present discussed the theme set for that meeting. These debates were recorded and later analysed, from which the editorial pieces in each issue arose.

Members of Marie Mineur would attend the meetings to discuss articles for publication, opening an issue to discussions of labor rights. Raymonde Harvengt, Christiane Rigomont, and Vercheval all wanted to make certain that the magazine never eschewed either the working class or the Bourgeoisie. Issues like "Women Celebrate, Women Strike" embodied this ideology.

The editorial staff encouraged a broad collaboration to enrich the magazine, including asking its readers to participate in the discourse of issues addressed in the journal. The staff organised public discussions after the publication of each issue. One such debate in 1975 resulted in three further articles being published over 1975–1976 within the magazine.

== Impact ==
Les Cahiers played an essential part in the women's movement of the 1970s, and then for feminist research into the 1980s. It provided a vehicle for discussions of gender studies before the topic was added to a university curriculum.

In January 1976, a Brazilian student named Eliana was brought to a GRIF meeting by her lawyer, Annie Luciana. Eliana had been hitchhiking in Brussels when she was forced at gunpoint to enter a wooded area, beaten, and tied to a tree, before being raped with a stick. However, Belgian law did not recognize the violation as rape. Women Overseas for Equality's founder, Lydia Horton, traveled to Charleroi with other women from the meeting. There, she spoke to the King's Prosecutor. A group of rape survivors testified as to the circumstances and aftermath of the crimes committed against them and demonstrated a need for the law to be changed. Léon Remacle, Miet Smet, André Bourgeois, and Leona Detiège proposed Parliamentary document 45K0166 on 23 February 1982. The definition of rape in Belgian law was expanded on 4 July 1989.

The magazine's success contributed to women being supportive of feminist political candidates and grassroots campaigns. The efforts of the team working with Collin in Paris in the 1980s in organising seminars and workshops led to the first survey in Europe of women's courses, which in turn led to the 1989 Brussels European conference on feminist research, an endeavor supported by the European Commission. This particular conference, held at the Université libre de Bruxelles 17–19 February, pointed out the need for increased funding for women's studies, as well as questioning whether these studies being interdisciplinary in nature effectively reduced the momentum of feminism. Rosi Braidotti, noting how the English title for the conference was "Women's Studies: Concepts and Reality" while the French was more accurately translated to "feminist studies," made a point of encouraging those present to learn multiple languages. With respect to the UK, attendees Claire Duchen and Christine Zmroczek expressed concerns over losing lesbian perspectives entirely after Margaret Thatcher's government passed Section 28 of the Local Government Act 1988. They reported that Black women's studies were non-existent. An absence of women not native to European Economic Community member nations among those at the conference was noted.

The surveys that led to the 1989 Brussels European conference also gave rise to GRACE, a database catalogue of the research and teaching efforts in Europe regarding women's studies.

Belgian universities subsequently held conferences to continue discussing feminist issues. The Lycée Français International d'Anvers organised a colloquium on gender and social class in September 1989. The Université catholique de Louvain organised a conference to study the history of women's power from 1889 to 1989 in December 1989. The Université libre de Bruxelles organised a meeting to discuss nineteenth and twentieth century women's behaviors in May 1990. Other conferences also arose out of the work of the feminists involved with Les Cahiers, such as the French Secretary of State for Women's Rights holding a conference 23–24 November 1991 on violence against women in Paris at which Collin spoke alongside Mathieu.

Evelyne Accad's Sexuality and War: Literary Masks of the Middle East, which analyses the writing of six fictional pieces focused on the Lebanese Civil War, appeared in an earlier iteration in the Spring 1990 issue of Les Cahiers. That issue was devoted to the testimonies of women who lived through the war, including interviews conducted by Collin and Accad, as well as an essay titled "The Other Face of Beirut" by Nazik Saba Yared.

A group known as Relire Les Cahiers du GRIF, or Re-read The GRIF Notebooks, organised a public symposium with open attendance in November 2023.

== Sources ==
- "Act of 4 July 1989 amending certain provisions relating to the crime of rape". Annual Review of Population Law (16): 119. 1989. ISSN 0364-3417. PMID 12344066.
- "Aus Anderen Ländern" [From Other Countries]. Courage (in German). No. 3. March 1979 – via Internet Archive.
- "Carnet de board Parisien" [Parisian Logbook]. L'autre Parole (in French). No. 48. December 1990. pp. 33–4.
- "Chicken Lady: Conferences". Off Our Backs. 18 (11): 20. December 1988. ISSN 0030-0071. JSTOR 25796665.
- "Document parlementaire 45K0166" [Parliamentary document 45K0166]. The Chamber of Representatives (in French). 23 February 1982.
- "Le féminisme pour quoi faire?". Les Cahiers du GRIF (in French). 1 (1). 1973.
- "Noticeboard". Feminist Review (14): 3. Summer 1983. ISSN 0141-7789. JSTOR 1394649.
- "Pour garder le contact". Les Cahiers du GRIF (in French). 1 (1). 1980.
- Allison, Dorothy (Winter 1978). "Feminist Women's Resources & Publications". Quest: A Feminist Quarterly. 4 (2): 94–100. ISSN 0098-955X. JSTOR community.28042850. OCLC 2242837.
- Amyuni, Mona Takieddine (Spring 1993). "And Life Went On... In War-Torn Lebanon". Arab Studies Quarterly. 15 (2): 1–13. ISSN 0271-3519. JSTOR 41858971.
- Bertrand-Jennings, Chantal (1983). "La presse des mouvements de libération des femme en France de 1971 à 1982" [The press of the women's liberation movements in France from 1971 to 1982]. In DesOrmeaux, Odette; Dupré, Louise (eds.). Féminité, subversion, and écriture [Femininity, subversion, and writing] (in French). Louiseville: Imprimerie Gagné. ISBN 2-89091-045-8 – via Internet Archive.
- Braidotti, Rosi (Spring 2014). "Thinking with an Accent: Françoise Collin, Les cahiers du Grif, and French Feminism". Signs. 39 (3): 597–626. doi:10.1086/674299. eISSN 1545-6943. ISSN 0097-9740. JSTOR 10.1086/674299.
- Bruner, David K. (Spring 1991). "General Area". World Literature Today. 65 (2): 357. doi:10.2307/40147300. ISSN 0196-3570. JSTOR 40147300.
- de Bellefeuille, Normand; Desautels, Denise; Labine, Marcel, eds. (September 1987). "Revue Les Cahiers du GRIF" [Review of The GRIF Notebooks]. La Barre du jour (in French). nbj. ISSN 0704-1888.
- Degraef, Véronique (Fall 1992). "Introducing GRACE-the European Community Women's Studies Database". Women's Studies Quarterly. 20 (3–4): 144–152. ISSN 0732-1562. JSTOR 40003712.
- Denis, Marie (March 1984). "«Le féminisme n'a pas fini de se penser»" ["Feminism is still reflecting on itself"]. La Vie en rose (magazine) (Interview) (in French). No. 16. Interviewed by Francine Pelletier; Hélène Pedneault. pp. 16–19.
- Denis, Marie; Van Rokeghem, Suzanne (1992). "Le féminisme est dans la rue: Belgique 1970-75" [Feminism is in the street: Belgium 1970-75] (PDF). Brussels: POL-HIS Politique & Histoire. ISBN 2-87311-009-0.
- DeRoo, Rebecca J. (2006). The Museum Establishment and Contemporary Art: The Politics of Artistic Display in France after 1968. New York: Cambridge University Press. ISBN 978-0-521-84109-2. LCCN 2005017945 – via Internet Archive.
- Deutscher, Penelope (Autumn 2000). ""A Matter of Affect, Passion, and Heart": Our Taste for New Narratives of the History of Philosophy". Hypatia. 15 (4): 1–17. ISSN 0887-5367. JSTOR 3810668.
- El Yamani, Myriame (1998). Médias et Féminismes: Minoritaires sans paroles [Media and Feminism: Minorities without voices] (in French). L'Harttman. ISBN 2-7384-6589-7 – via Internet Archive.
- Florenne, Yves (16 February 1975). "Science et destin – Africaines – Projets – «la» GRIF" [Science and destiny – African Women – Projects – "the" GRIF]. Le Monde diplomatique (in French). Vol. 32, no. 9359. p. 13 – via Internet Archive.
- Frabotta, Biancamaria (1989). "Left Hand, White Poetry". Annali d'Italianistica. 7. Translated by Keala Jewell: 341–353. ISSN 0741-7527. JSTOR 24003875.
- Gelfland, Elissa D.; Hules, Virginia Thorndike (1985). Cain, William E. (ed.). French Feminist Criticism: Women, Language, and Literature. An Annotated Bibiliography. Garland Bibliographies of Modern Critics and Critical Schools. New York: Garland Publishing Inc. ISBN 0-8240-9252-X. LCCN 82-48275 – via Internet Archive.
- Ginsburger, Nicolas (July 2017). "Women in geography in an era of change. Feminisation and feminism in the French and international academic field (1960-1990)". L'Espace géographique. 46 (3): 1–28. ISSN 0046-2497. JSTOR 26872158.
- Glorie, Caroline (21 September 2023). "Colloque Les 50 ans des Cahiers du Grif – 20 et 21 novembre 2023" (in French). Groupe de recherche.
- Glorie, Caroline; Hoogeveen, Teresa, eds. (2023). La première revue féministe francophone. Les cahiers du GRIF (in French). Les Impressions Nouvelles. ISBN 9782390700777.
- Hoogeveen, Teresa (30 September 2023). "Fracturing the Private-Public Divide Through Action: Reading Les Cahiers du Grif". Ethics, Politics & Society. 4: 153–174. doi:10.21814/eps.4.1.194.
- Lamoureux, Diane (2016). "Françoise Collin et les Chaiers du GRIF: Penser/agir en dehors des grandes centres" [Françoise Collin and the GRIF Notebooks: Thinking/Acting outside the major centers]. Sextant (in French) (33): 55–63. doi:10.4000/sextant.618. ISBN 978-2-8004-1600-7 – via Internet Archive.
- Levin, Tobe; Myers-Dickinson, Jo (Winter 1990). "Women's Studies in Europe: Conference Report, Part 1". NWSA Journal. 2 (1): 101–104. ISSN 1040-0656. JSTOR 4315996.
- Marissal, Claudine; Gubin, Éliane (2011). Jeanne Vercheval, Un engagement social et Féministe (PDF) (in French). Institut pour l’égalité des femmes et des hommes. Archived (PDF) from the original on 23 September 2015.
- Montanaro, Mara (2016). "«Il n'y a pas de libération sans déplacement» : l'héritage subversif de Françoise Collin" ["There is no liberation without displacement": the subversive heritage of Françoise Collin]. Sextant (in French) (33): 65–75. ISBN 978-2-8004-1600-7 – via Internet Archive.
- Paquot, Thierry (March 1990). "Repères" [Key points]. Esprit (in French) (160): 152–3. ISSN 0014-0759. JSTOR 24273313.
- Peemans-Poullet, Hedwige (October 2020). "« Je ne suis pas née féministe, je le suis devenue »" ["I wasn't born a feminist, I became one"]. Ensemble! (Interview) (in French). No. 103. Interviewed by Yves Martens. pp. 96–104.
- Planté, Christine (2000). "Voilà ce qui fait que votre e est muette" [It is this which makes your e silent]. Clio. Femmes, genre, histoire (in French) (11): 119–140. ISSN 1252-7017. JSTOR 44405094.
- Rémy, Monique (Fall 1992). "Women's Studies in Belgium". Women's Studies Quarterly. 20 (3). Translated by Tobe Levin: 68–74. ISSN 0732-1562. JSTOR 40003704.
- Rochefort, Florence (2017). "French feminisms and the politics of women's names: from the Belle Époque to the present". Clio. Women, Gender, History (45). Translated by Regan Kramer: 103–125. JSTOR 26610840.
- Roque, Georges (Spring 1979). "Livres et revues" [Books and reviews]. Parachute (in French). No. 14.
- Vergès, Françoise (2022) [2020]. A Feminist Theory of Violence: A Decolonial Perspective. Translated by Melissa Thackway. London: Pluto Press. ISBN 978-0-7453-4569-7 – via Internet Archive.
- Wernaers, Camille (12 October 2023). "50 ans des Cahiers du Grif: "Cette revue a bouleversé la vie des femmes"" [50 years of Cahiers du Grif: "This magazine has changed the lives of women"]. RTBF (in French).
- Zmroczek, Christine; Duchen, Claire (1991). "What are those women up to? Women's Studies and Feminist Research in the European Community". In Aaron, Jane; Walby, Sylvia (eds.). Out of the Margins: Women's Studies in the Nineties. London: The Falmer Press. ISBN 1-85000-968-6.
