= List of Guggenheim Fellowships awarded in 2013 =

List of Guggenheim Fellowships awarded in 2013: Guggenheim Fellowships have been awarded annually since 1925, by the John Simon Guggenheim Memorial Foundation to those "who have demonstrated exceptional capacity for productive scholarship or exceptional creative ability in the arts."

Fellow	Category	Field of Study
Kim Abeles	Creative Arts	Fine Arts
luciana achugar	Creative Arts	Choreography
Kim Adams	Creative Arts	Fine Arts
Kati Agócs	Creative Arts	Music Composition
Diana Allan	Creative Arts	Film-Video
Siemon Allen	Creative Arts	Fine Arts
Elizabeth S. Anderson	Humanities	Philosophy
L.S. Asekoff	Creative Arts	Poetry
Marcos Balter	Creative Arts	Music Composition
Leigh Behnke	Creative Arts	Fine Arts
James Bever	Natural Sciences	Plant Sciences
Philip Boehm	Humanities	Translation
Philip Bohlman	Humanities	Music Research
Philippe Bourgeois	Social Sciences	Anthropology & Cultural Studies
Yomi Braester	Social Sciences	Film, Video & Radio Studies
Benjamin Broening	Creative Arts	Music Composition
Brian Brooks	Creative Arts	Choreography
Nathan Brown	Humanities	Near Eastern Studies
D. Graham Burnett	Humanities	History of Science, Technology & Economics
Hui Cao	Natural Sciences	Engineering
Peter Clote	Natural Sciences	Applied Mathematics
Cora Cohen	Creative Arts	Fine Arts
Jean-Louis Cohen	Humanities	Architecture, Planning & Design
Jennifer Cole	Humanities	African Studies
Jon Coleman	Humanities	U.S. History
Scott Conarroe	Creative Arts	Photography
Erin Courtney	Creative Arts	Drama and Performance Arts
Brian R. Crane	Natural Sciences	Chemistry
Cathy Lee Crane	Creative Arts	Film-Video
Bryan J. Cuevas	Humanities	Religion
Tom Daniel	Natural Sciences	Organismic Biology & Ecology
Kate Daniels	Creative Arts	Poetry
Erik Demaine	Natural Sciences	Computer Science
Martin Demaine	Creative Arts	Computer Science
Kiran Desai	Creative Arts	Fiction
Kathleen Donohue	Natural Sciences	Plant Sciences
Faye Driscoll	Creative Arts	Choreography
Aaron Einbond	Creative Arts	Music Composition
Lee Epstein	Social Sciences	Law
Gary W. Evans	Social Sciences	Psychology
Stuart Firestein	Natural Sciences	Science Writing
Kate Fodor	Creative Arts	Drama & Performance Art
Joshua Foer	Creative Arts	General Nonfiction
Alessandro Forte	Natural Sciences	Earth Science
Jerold C. Frakes	Humanities	Medieval & Renaissance Literature
Max Paul Friedman	Humanities	European & Latin American History
Andrew Frisardi	Humanities	Translation
Robert D. Fulk	Humanities	Linguistics
Juliana (Coco) Fusco	Creative Arts	Film-Video
Charles Gaines	Creative Arts	Fine Arts
Lynn Garafola	Humanities	Dance Studies
André Gaudreault	Humanities	Film, Video, & Radio Studies
Ross Gay	Creative Arts	Poetry
Bruce Gilden	Creative Arts	Photography
Kathy Goodell	Creative Arts	Fine Arts
Jessica Green	Natural Sciences	Organismic Biology & Ecology
Richard Grossman	Social Sciences	Economics
Sonali Gulati	Creative Arts	Film-Video
David L. Haberman	Humanities	Religion
Maggie Hadleigh-West	Creative Arts	Film-Video
J.C. Hallman	Creative Arts	General Nonfiction
Barbara Hammer	Creative Arts	Film-Video
Amy Harmon	Natural Sciences	Science Writing
Kyle Harper	Humanities	European & Latin American History
Sharon Harper	Creative Arts	Photography
Bill Hayes	Creative Arts	General Nonfiction
Guy Hedreen	Humanities	Fine Arts Research
Susannah Heschel	Humanities	Intellectual & Cultural History
John Hibbing	Social Sciences	Political Science
Jennifer Homans	Creative Arts	Biography
Channa Horwitz	Creative Arts	Fine Arts
Major Jackson	Creative Arts	Poetry
Joel Janowitz	Creative Arts	Fine Arts
Maya Jasanoff	Humanities	Intellectual & Cultural History
Adam Johnson	Creative Arts	Fiction
Bill Johnston	Humanities	Translation
Troy Jollimore	Creative Arts	Poetry
Kimsooja	Creative Arts	Film-Video
Robert Klitzman	Natural Sciences	Medicine & Health
Amer Kobaslija	Creative Arts	Fine Arts
Michael Kolster	Creative Arts	Photography
Harriet Korman	Creative Arts	Fine Arts
Samuel Kou	Natural Sciences	Statistics
Judith F. Kroll	Social Sciences	Psychology
Norah Krug	Creative Arts	Fine Arts
Rachel Kushner	Creative Arts	Fiction
Jane Landers	Humanities	European & Latin American History
Deana Lawson	Creative Arts	Photography
Ben Lerner	Creative Arts	Poetry
Michael Lesy	Humanities	Photography Studies
Zhongjie Lin	Humanities	Architecture, Planning, & Design
Lilla LoCurto	Creative Arts	Fine Arts
Marie Losier	Creative Arts	Film-Video
Julia Reinhard Lupton	Humanities	English Literature
Deborah Luster	Creative Arts	Photography
Catherine Lutz	Social Sciences	Anthropology & Cultural Studies
Natalie Mahowald	Natural Sciences	Earth Science
Jeff Malmberg	Creative Arts	Film-Video
Jon Marans	Creative Arts	Drama & Performance Art
Ben Marcus	Creative Arts	Fiction
Cleopatra Mathis	Creative Arts	Poetry
Elaine Tyler May	Humanities	U.S. History
Patricia McAnany	Social Studies	Anthropology & Cultural Studies
David McDonald	Creative Arts	Fine Arts
David Means	Creative Arts	Fiction
Myra Melford	Creative Arts	Music Composition
Alexander Merkurjev	Natural Sciences	Mathematics
Robin Miller	Humanities	European & Latin American Literature
Elijah Millgram	Humanities	Philosophy
Carman Moore	Creative Arts	Music Composition
Paul Moravec	Creative Arts	Music Composition
Carrie Moyer	Creative Arts	Fine Arts
Sylvia Nasar	Creative Arts	General Nonfiction
Kevin Ohi	Humanities	Literary Criticism
Ian Olds	Creative Arts	Film-Video
Patti Oleon	Creative Arts	Fine Arts
William Outcault	Creative Arts	Fine Arts
Scott E. Page	Social Sciences	Political Science
David Parker	Creative Arts	Choreography
Laura Parnes	Creative Arts	Film-Video
Christian Patterson	Creative Arts	Photography
Catherine Peichel	Natural Sciences	Molecular & Cellular Biology
Indira Peterson	Humanities	South Asian Studies
Ann Pibal	Creative Arts	Fine Arts
Joanna Picciotto	Humanities	English Literature
Jean-Michel Pilc	Creative Arts	Music Composition
Claire Porter	Creative Arts	Choreography
Narong Prangcharoen	Creative Arts	Music Composition
Leah Price	Humanities	Intellectual & Cultural History
Charan Ranganath	Natural Sciences	Neuroscience
Leonardo Rastelli	Natural Sciences	Physics
Richard L. Roberts	Humanities	African Studies
Carlin Romano	Creative Arts	General Nonfiction
Harry Roseman	Creative Arts	Fine Arts
David Rosenberg	Creative Arts	General Nonfiction
Mathew Rosenblum	Creative Arts	Music Composition
Sophia Rosenfeld	Humanities	Intellectual & Cultural History
Susan Rotroff	Humanities	Classics
Philip Round	Humanities	American Literature
Ira Sachs	Creative Arts	Film-Video
Leigh Schmidt	Humanities	Religion
Gary Schneider	Creative Arts	Photography
David Scott	Humanities	Fine Arts Research
Daniel Sharfstein	Humanities	U.S. History
Brenda Shaughnessy	Creative Arts	Poetry
M. Rahim Shayegan	Humanities	Classics
Nancy Sherman	Humanities	Philosophy
Sheila Silver	Creative Arts	Music Composition
Mike Sinclair	Creative Arts	Photography
Elena Sisto	Creative Arts	Fine Arts
Greg Smith	Creative Arts	Fine Arts
Dean Snyder	Creative Arts	Fine Arts
Chris Sollars	Creative Arts	Fine Arts
Alec Soth	Creative Arts	Photography
Valerio Spada	Creative Arts	Photography
Jacqueline Stevens	Humanities	U.S. History
Kristen A. Stilt	Social Sciences	Constitutional Studies
Karen Sullivan	Humanities	Medieval & Renaissance Literature
Terese Svoboda	Creative Arts	Fiction
Ann Taves	Humanities	Religion
Nora Taylor	Creative Arts	Theatre Arts
Leslie Thornton	Creative Arts	Film-Video
Thomas Travisano	Creative Arts	Biography
Marc Van De Mieroop	Humanities	Near Eastern Studies
Marten H. van Kerkwijk	Natural Sciences	Astronomy-Astrophysics
Mary Jo Vath	Creative Arts	Fine Arts
Richard von Glahn	Humanities	East Asian Studies
Anne Waldman	Creative Arts	Poetry
Brett L. Walker	Humanities	History of Science, Technology, & Economics
Susan Wanklyn	Creative Arts	Fine Arts
Joshua Weiner	Creative Arts	Poetry
Robert Weller	Humanities	East Asian Studies
Colson Whitehead	Creative Arts	Fiction
Ann Zabludoff	Natural Sciences	Astronomy-Astrophysics
Dongping Zhong	Natural Sciences	Chemistry
