= Athénaïs Michelet =

French writer

- Born: 1826
- Died: 1899 (aged 72–73)
- Spouse: Jules Michelet 1849–1874 (his death)
- Writing career
- Genres: Natural history, memoir
- Subject: History

Athénaïs Michelet (1826–1899), née Mialaret, was a French natural history writer and memoirist. She wrote independently and in collaboration with her husband, Jules Michelet.

== Marriage and literary collaboration ==
While tutoring the children of the Princess Cantacuzène in Vienna, Athénaïs first encountered Jules Michelet through his literary work. She had written to him after reading Du prêtre, de la femme et de la famille. They began a correspondence that ensued for years and they became engaged before meeting. They married in 1849, ten years after the death of his first wife.

Their mutual literary interests remained the basis of their relationship even after their marriage. She and her husband entered into a shared literary life, collaborating on L'Oiseau (1856), L'Insecte (1857), La Mer (1861), and La Montagne (1868). Although these books were published only under Jules Michelet's name, he explicitly credited Athénaïs, not only for turning his attention to natural history, but also as an active collaborator. At his death, they were working on La nature.

== Bequeathed literary rights ==
Before he died in 1874, Jules Michelet accorded Athénaïs literary rights to his books and papers, acknowledging their collaboration and that she had a significant role in the writing he published during his later years. Although the legacy of his works was contested by Jules Michelet's son-in-law, Athénaïs won the court case and retained the papers and publishing rights.

== Michelet scholarship ==
In a tradition of writing about Jules Michelet during the century following his death, some authors painted Athénaïs as exerting control to guide her husband's literary endeavours along her own lines of interest. In response to that interpretation, historian Bonnie Smith, discusses a potentially misogynist effort to discount the contributions of Athénaïs and notes, "Michelet scholarship, like other historiographical debates, has taken great pains to establish the priority of the male over the female in writing history".

== Solo writing career ==
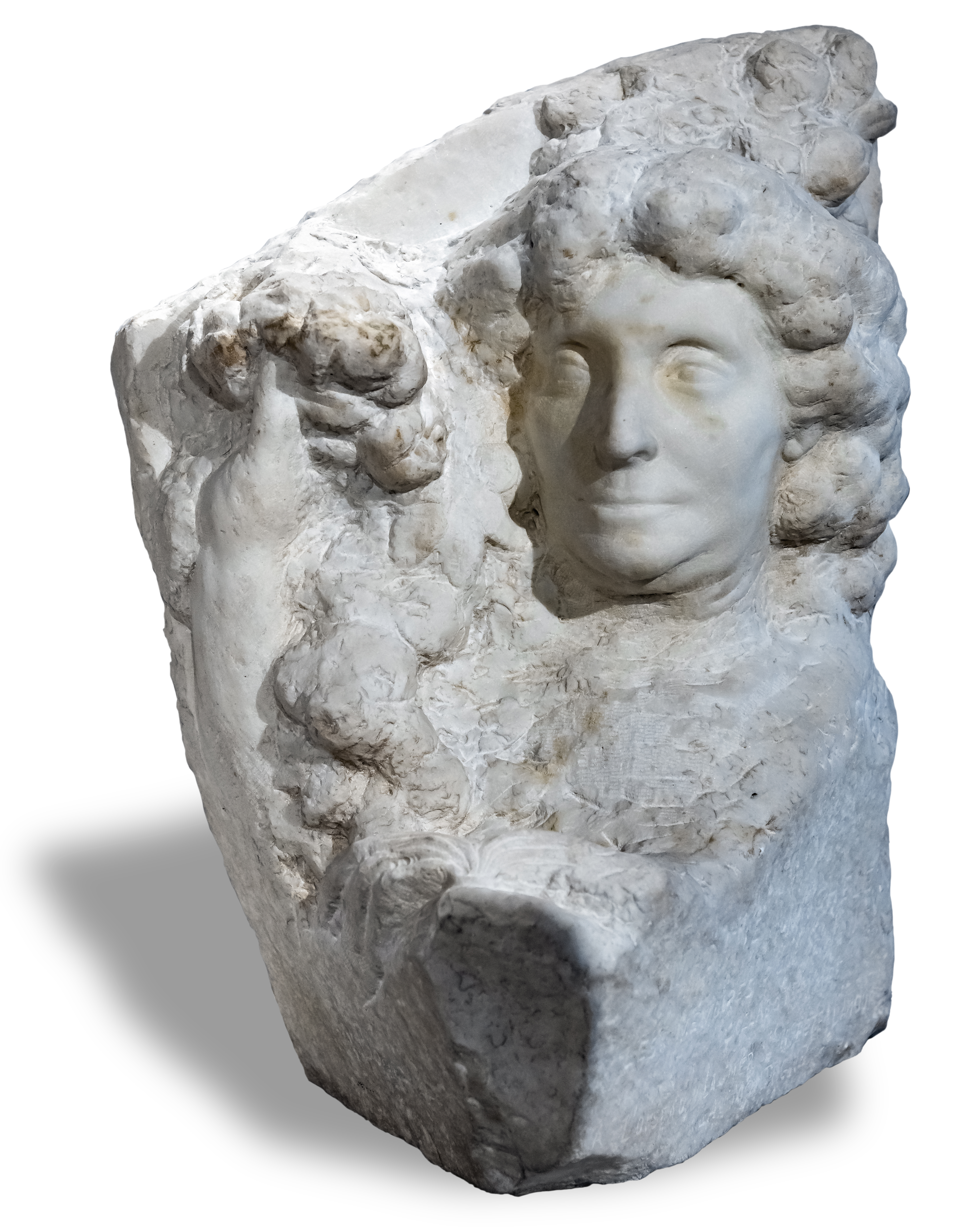
Bust of Madame Michelet, 1899 by Antoine Bourdelle

She published several books in her own right, including Mémoires d'une enfant in 1867. She also wrote a book expressly for the English audience that was published in 1872 as, Nature, or the poetry of earth and sea (London: T. Nelson 1872).

Also being a memoirist, after the death of her husband in 1874, she published several books about him and his family, based on the extracts and journals he had left her.

While researching cat behavior, she corresponded with Charles Darwin, which has been preserved. Her related book, Les chats, was published posthumously in 1904.

== Death ==
Upon her death in 1899, she bequeathed the literary legacy to Gabriel Monod, a historian who had founded the Revue Historique in 1876.
