= Jules Michelet =

French writer and historian (1798–1874)

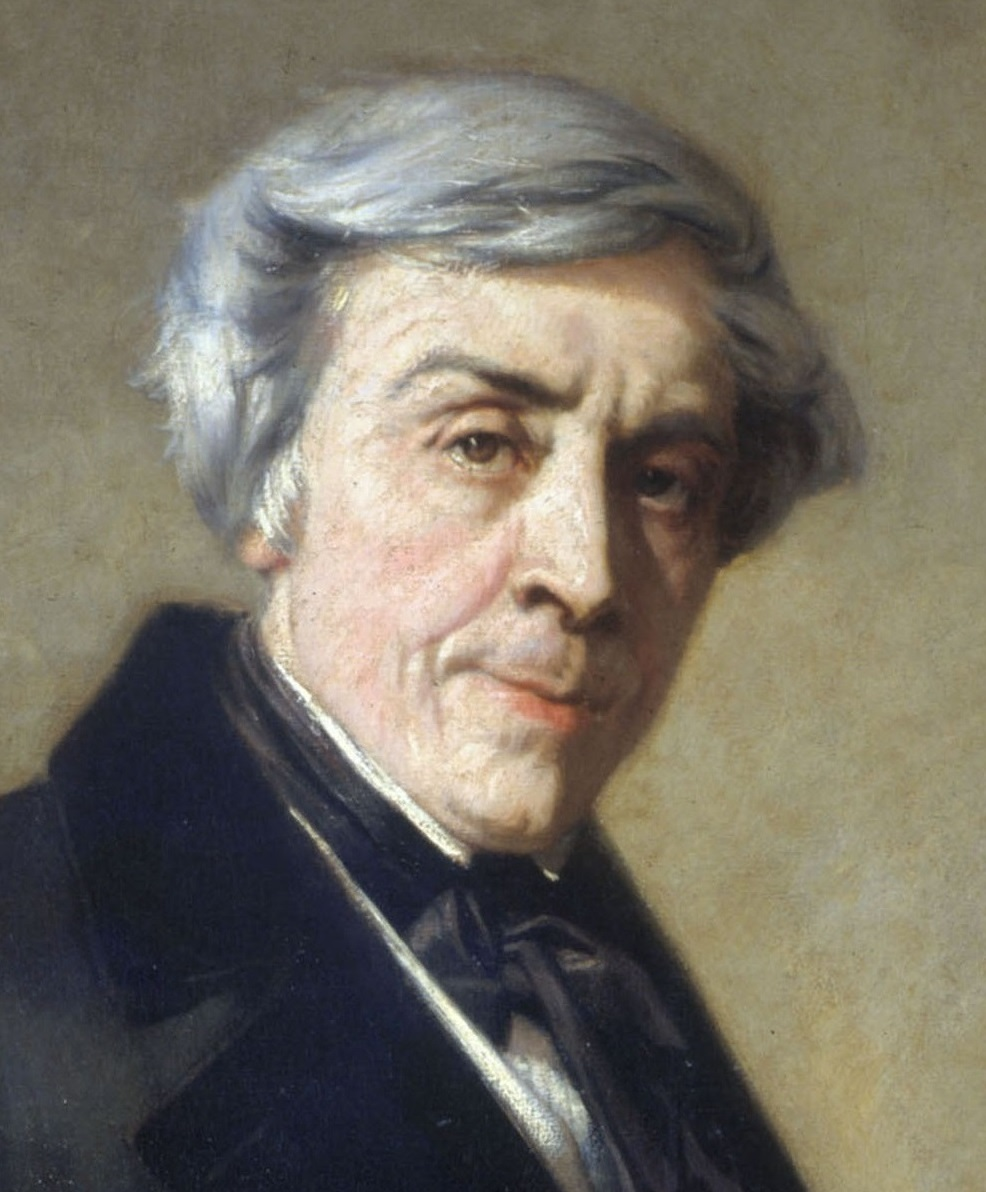
- Detail of a portrait by Thomas Couture, c. 1865
- Born: 21 August 1798; Paris, France
- Died: 9 February 1874 (aged 75); Hyères, France
- Occupations: Historian; writer; philosopher; teacher
- Spouses: Pauline Rousseau (m. 1824–1839); Athénaïs Michelet (m. 1849)

Education
- Education: University of Paris

Philosophical work
- Era: Modern philosophy: 19th-century philosophy
- Region: Western philosophy: French philosophy
- School: Anti-clericalism; Freethought; Republicanism
- Main interests: French history

Jules Michelet (French: [ʒyl miʃlɛ]; 21 August 1798 – 9 February 1874) was a French historian and writer, best known for his multi-volume work Histoire de France (History of France), which chronicles the history of France from its earliest origins to the French Revolution. Michelet was influenced by Giambattista Vico, particularly by his emphasis on the role of ordinary people and their customs in shaping historical narratives, which contrasted with the traditional focus on political and military elites. Michelet also drew inspiration from Vico's concept of the corsi e ricorsi—the cyclical nature of history—in which societies rise and fall in a recurring pattern.

In Histoire de France, Michelet coined the term ''Renaissance'' (French for "rebirth") to describe a cultural movement in Europe that marked a clear departure from the Middle Ages. Although the term was initially used by the Italian art historian Giorgio Vasari in 1550 to describe the revival of classical art beginning with Giotto, Michelet was the first historian to apply the French equivalent systematically to a broader historical era. His use of the term "Renaissance'' established the modern interpretation of this period as a time of renewed humanism, artistic flourishing, and intellectual transformation in "post-medieval" Europe.

Historian François Furet described Michelet's The History of the French Revolution as "the cornerstone of revolutionary historiography" and "a literary monument."

== Early life and education ==
Michelet’s father was a master printer, and Michelet often assisted him in his work. He was later offered a position at the imperial printing office but chose instead to study at the Lycée Charlemagne, a prestigious secondary school in Paris. He passed the university examination in 1821 and was soon appointed to a professorship of history at the Collège Rollin.

In 1824, Michelet married Pauline Rousseau. The couple had their first child, Adèle, the same year. Among Michelet's notable patrons were Abel-François Villemain and Victor Cousin, who supported his early academic career.

Since childhood, he is said to have embraced republicanism and a distinctive form of Romantic free thought. He was an active political thinker, a man of letters, and a committed historian. His first published works were school textbooks.

Between 1825 and 1827, he produced a series of drafts, chronological tables, and preparatory materials relating to modern history. In 1827, he published Précis d’histoire moderne, an influential overview of contemporary history. That same year, he was appointed as a maître de conférences at the École normale supérieure. He followed this with Introduction à l'histoire universelle in 1831.

== Record Office ==
The events of the July Revolution of 1830 put Michelet in a better position for his research. He secured a position at the Record Office and served as deputy professor under historian François Guizot in the literary faculty of the University of France. Soon afterwards, he began his magnum opus, the Histoire de France, which would take 30 years to complete. He also published numerous other books, such as the Œuvres choisies de Vico, the Mémoires de Luther écrits par lui-même, the Origines du droit français, and somewhat later, the le Procès des Templiers.

In 1838, Michelet's studies reinforced his natural aversion to the principles of authority and ecclesiasticism. During the revival of Jesuit activity in France, he was appointed to the chair of history at the Collège de France. Assisted by his friend Edgar Quinet, he began a polemic against the religious order and the principles that it represented.

He published Histoire Romaine in 1839, the same year his first wife died. The results of his lectures appeared in the volumes Du prêtre, de la femme et de la famille and Le peuple. These books do not display the dramatic style (partly borrowed from Lamennais) that characterizes Michelet's later works. However, they contain many of his core beliefs—a mixture of sentimentalism, communism, and anti-sacerdotalism.

Michelet, along with many others, propagated the principles that led to the outbreaks of 1848. When the revolution broke out, instead of attempting to enter active political life, he devoted himself to his literary work. Besides continuing the Histoire de France, he also wrote Histoire de la Révolution française during the years between the downfall of Louis Philippe and the final establishment of Napoleon III.

In 1849, at 51, he married his second wife, the 23-year-old Athénaïs Michelet (née Mialaret). She was a natural history writer and memoirist and had republican sympathies. She had been a teacher in Saint Petersburg before their extensive correspondence led to marriage. They entered into a shared literary life and she would assist him significantly in his endeavors. He openly acknowledged this, although she was never given credit in his works.

== Minor works ==
After Napoleon III’s rise to power in 1852, Jules Michelet lost his position at the Record Office due to his refusal to swear loyalty to the new emperor. While Michelet’s primary focus remained on his major work, Histoire de France, he also produced additional writings during this period. Some of these were expanded versions of specific episodes from Histoire, presented as commentaries or companion volumes. One such example is Les Femmes de la Révolution (1854), which examined the role of women in the French Revolution, covering the period from 1780 to 1794.

During this period, Michelet began a series of books on natural history, starting with L’Oiseau (1856). These works reflected his pantheistic worldview rather than a strictly scientific approach and were partly inspired by his wife, Athénaïs. The series continued with L'Insecte (1858), La Mer (1861), and La Montagne (1868). In La Montagne, Michelet adopted a more lyrical style than his typical historical narratives, employing a staccato technique with short, fragmented sentences to build emotional tension.

Two other works from this period, L’Amour (1859) and La Femme (1860), represent another thematic direction in Michelet’s writing. These books generated debate for their detailed exploration of personal relationships and the evolving role of women in society. These books also explored broader cultural and literary themes within French society. Notably, Vincent van Gogh referenced La Femme in his drawing Sorrow, inscribing it with the quote: “Comment se fait-il qu’il y ait sur la terre une femme seule?” (“How can there be on earth a woman alone?”).

In 1862, Michelet published La Sorcière (Satanism and Witchcraft), a book that developed from a historical topic and reflected some of his more unconventional views. In 1973, the work was adapted into an animated art film, Belladonna of Sadness, directed by Eiichi Yamamoto and produced by Mushi Production.

Although Michelet continued to write in a similar style, his later works received less critical attention. For instance, La Bible de l’humanité (1864), a historical overview of world religions, did not achieve the same level of readership in the 20th century as his earlier publications.

The writing and publication of these works, along with the completion of Histoire de France, occupied Michelet throughout both decades of the Second Empire. During this time, he lived partly in France and partly in Italy, frequently spending winters on the French Riviera, particularly in Hyères.

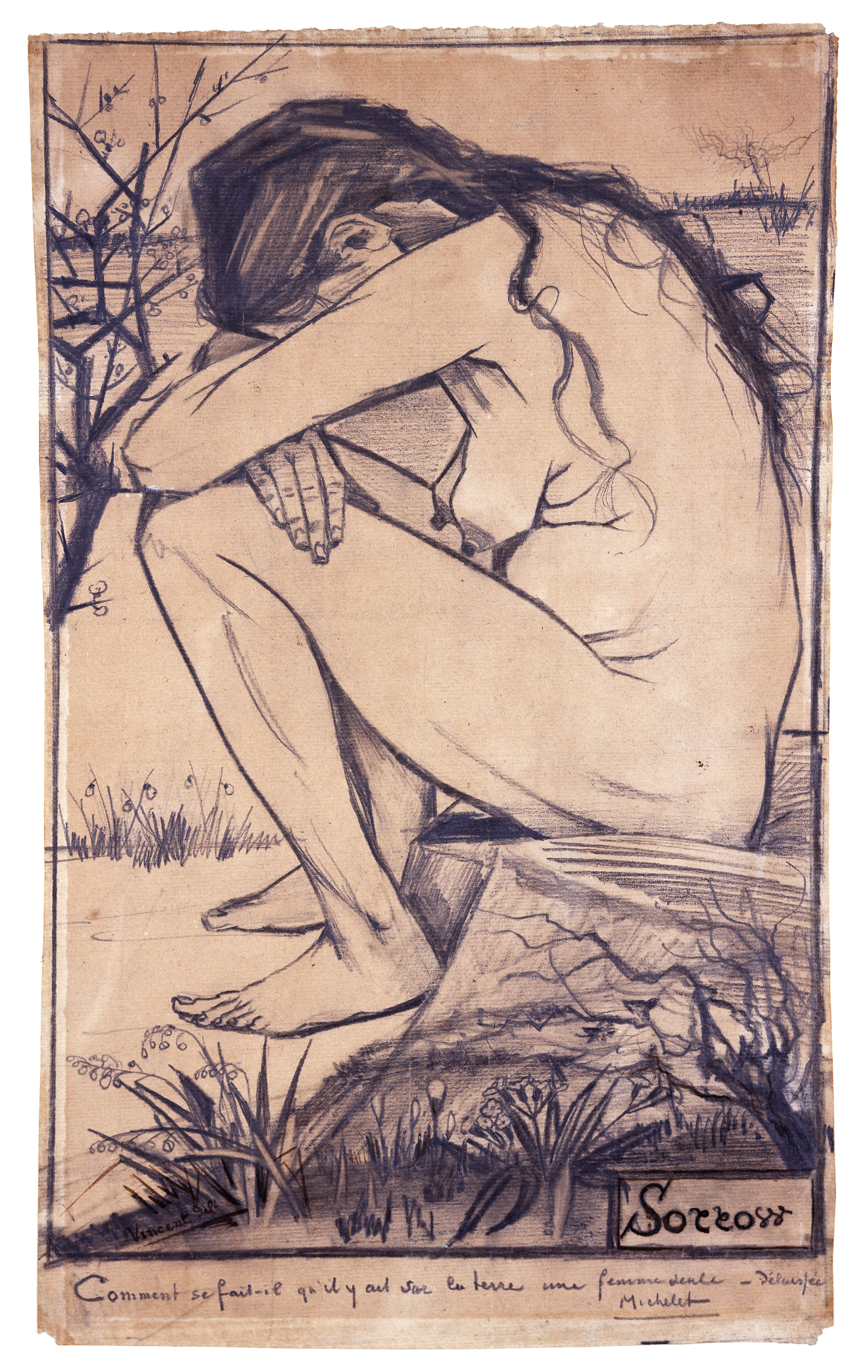
Vincent van Gogh inscribed his drawing, Sorrow, with a quote from "La Femme": "Comment se fait-il qu'il y ait sur la terre une femme seule?", which translates to How can there be on earth a woman alone?

== Histoire de France ==
Photograph of Jules Michelet, late in his career

In 1867, Michelet completed his magnum opus, the Histoire de France, comprising 19 volumes. The first of these deals with early French history up to the death of Charlemagne; the second with the flourishing time of feudal France; the third with the thirteenth century; the fourth, fifth, and sixth volumes with the Hundred Years' War; the seventh and eighth with the establishment of the royal power under Charles VII and Louis XI. The 16th and 17th centuries have four volumes apiece, much of which is very distantly connected with French history proper, especially in the two volumes entitled Renaissance and Reforme. The last three volumes carry on the history of the eighteenth century to the outbreak of the Revolution.

Michelet abhorred the Middle Ages and celebrated their end as a radical transformation. He attempted to clarify how a lively Renaissance could originate from an ossified medieval culture.

== Themes ==
Michelet had several themes running throughout his works, which included the following three categories: maleficent, beneficent, and paired. Within each of the three themes, there are subsets of ideas occurring throughout Michelet's various works. One of these themes was the idea of paired themes; for example, in many of his works, he writes on grace and justice, grace being the woman or feminine, and justice being more of a masculine idea. Michelet often used union and unity in his discussions about history, both human and natural.

In terms of the maleficent themes, there were subcategories: themes of the dry, which included concepts such as the machine, the Jesuits, scribes, the electric, irony (Goethe), the Scholastics, public safety, and fatalism (Hobbes, Molinos, Spinoza, Hegel). Themes of the empty and the turgid included the Middle Ages, imitation, tedium, the novel, narcotics, Alexander, and plethoric (engorged blood). Michelet also touches on themes of the indeterminate such as the Honnêtes-Hommes, Condé, Chantilly Sade, gambling, phantasmagoria, Italian comedy, white blood, and sealed blood.

Martial dualism is a prominent theme for him. He wrote, "With the world began a war which will end only with the world: war of man against nature, spirit against matter, liberty against fatality. History is nothing other than the record of this interminable struggle." Intellectual historian David Nirenberg describes this as a "Manichaean dualism." His framing of history as a struggle between Christian spirit and liberty against Jewish matter, fatality, and tyranny, is seen by Nirenberg as an example of anti-Judaism as a constituent conceptual tool in western thought.

During his career, Michelet wrote a pamphlet on the condition on France’s popular masses in relation to the growth of machinery, arguing that the latter had brought about positive developments in addition to negative consequences. As noted by one observer, “While well aware that machines enslaved and demeaned their serfs, he noticed nevertheless that machine products improved the general condition of the laboring poor, among whom peasants and artisans were still much more numerous than industrial workers.” Machines, according to Michelet, had made it financially possible for whole classes to obtain household items they had never possessed before such as curtains, body linen, bed and table linen. As Michelet argued, “Once upon a time, every women wore a single blue or black gown that she kept ten years without washing, for fear that it would fall to shreds. Today, her husband, poor working man, for one day’s wages, covers her with a garment of flowers.”

== Academic reception ==
Michelet was perhaps the first historian to devote himself to anything resembling a picturesque history of the Middle Ages and his account is still one of the most vivid that exists. He spent extensive time researching printed authorities and manuscripts for his Histoire de France, however, his many personal biases (both political and religious) reduced the book's objectivity.

Michelet gave certain parts of history more weight than others, however, his insistence that history should concentrate on "the people, and not only its leaders or its institutions" was unique in historical scholarship at the time.

== Political life ==
The fall of Napoleon in 1870 amid France's defeat by Prussia, followed by the rise and fall of the Paris Commune the next year, once more stimulated Michelet to activity. While he wrote letters and pamphlets during the struggle, upon its conclusion he became determined to add a 19th volume (French: XIXe siècle) to his Histoires which covered the Napoleonic Wars. He did not, however, live to carry it further than the Battle of Waterloo, and his health was beginning to fail: he opened the 19th volume with the words "l'âge me presse" ("age hurries me").

The new republic was not altogether a restoration for Michelet; his professorship at the Collège de France, of which he always contended he had been unjustly deprived, was not given back to him.

== Marriages ==
As a young man, Michelet married Pauline Rousseau in 1824. The couple had two children, Adèle and Charles, in 1824 and 1829, respectively. His first wife died of tuberculosis in 1839 at the age of 48.

Michelet married his second wife, Athénaïs Michelet, in 1849. She had been a teacher in Saint Petersburg and was an author in natural history and memoirs. She had opened a correspondence with him arising from her ardent admiration of his ideas that ensued for years. They became engaged before they had seen each other. After their marriage, the couple had one child, Yves Jean Lazare, in 1850. She collaborated with Michelet in his labors albeit without formal credit, introduced him to natural history, inspired him on themes, and was preparing a new work, La nature, at the time of his death in 1874. She lived until 1899.

== Death and burials ==
Upon his death from a heart attack at Hyères on 9 February 1874, Michelet was interred there. At his widow's request, a Paris court granted permission for his body to be exhumed on 13 May 1876 so he could be buried in Paris.

On 16 May, his coffin arrived for reburial at Le Père Lachaise Cemetery in Paris. Michelet's monument was built there, designed by architect Jean-Louis Pascal, was erected in 1893 through public subscription.

== Bequest of literary rights ==
Michelet bequeathed Athénaïs literary rights to his books and papers before he died, acknowledging the significant role she had in what he published during his later years. After winning a court challenge to this bequest, Athénaïs retained the papers and publishing rights. A memoirist, she later published several books about her husband and his family based on extracts and journals he had left her.

Athénaïs bequeathed that literary legacy to Gabriel Monod, a historian who founded the Revue historique journal. The historian Bonnie Smith notes the potentially misogynistic effort to discount the contributions of Athénaïs. Smith writes: "Michelet scholarship, like other historiographical debates, has taken great pains to establish the priority of the male over the female in writing history."

== Selected works ==
- Histoire de la révolution française, (1847–1853, 7 vols.). English translation: The History of the French Revolution (Charles Cocks, trans., 1847), online
- Histoire romaine, (1831, 2 vols.). English translation: History of the Roman Republic (William Hazlitt, trans., 1847), online
- Histoire de France, (1833–1867, 19 vols.). English translation: The History of France (W. K. Kelly, trans., vol. 1–2 only), vol. 1, vol. 2 online.
- On History: Introduction to World History (1831); Opening Address at the Faculty of Letters (1834); Preface to History of France (1869). Trans. Flora Kimmich, Lionel Gossman and Edward K. Kaplan. Cambridge, UK: Open Book Publishers, 2013, online
- Œuvres complètes (Complete works, 1971–, vols. 1–9, 16–18, 20–21 published), edited by Paul Viallaneix

== See also ==
- Historiography of the French Revolution
