= Françoise Thébaud =

French historian

Françoise Thébaud Professor Emerita
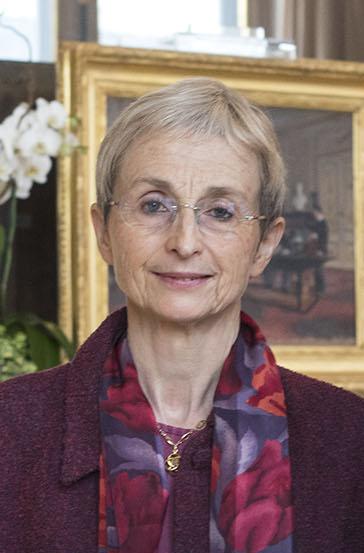
- (2017)
- Born: 1952 (age 73–74)
- Awards: Chevalier of the Légion d'honneur

Academic background
- Education: École normale supérieure de lettres et sciences humaines

Academic work
- Discipline: History
- Sub-discipline: Women's history
- Institutions: Lumière University Lyon 2; Avignon University; University of Geneva
- Notable works: Quand nos grands-mères donnaient la vie (1986)

Françoise Thébaud (born 1952) is a French historian, professor emeritus of history, and specialist in the history of women. In 2017, she was awarded the Chevalier of the Légion d'honneur.

== Early life and education ==
Françoise Thébaud was born in 1952.

She studied at the École normale supérieure de lettres et sciences humaines, and completed a 3rd cycle thesis entitled Quand nos grand-mères donnaient la vie : la maternité en France dans l'entre-deux guerres (When our grandmothers gave life: motherhood in France in the interwar period). She completed the Agrégation d'histoire in 1975.

== Career and research ==
Thébaud was a teacher-researcher from 1985 to 1997 at Lumière University Lyon 2 and then, in 1995, presented a university habilitation dissertation in history entitled Écrire l’histoire des femmes : bilans et perspectives (Writing the history of women: assessments and perspectives), at Lumière University Lyon 2. She served as professor of contemporary history at Avignon University, from 1997 to 2007, before assuming the title of professor emeritus. Affiliated with Institut des Etudes Genre de l’Université de Genève (Institute of Gender Studies of the University of Geneva) and Labex EHNE (Écrire une histoire nouvelle de l'Europe), some of Thébaud's research has focused on:

- history of feminisms and feminists
- social and political history of motherhood
- writing and epistemology of history: from the history of women to the history of gender

In her book Quand nos grands-mères donnaient la vie (When Our Grandmothers Gave Life) (1986), Thébaud draws on censuses, demographic and economic statistics, medical theses, obstetrics and childcare manuals, to reconstruct the experience of motherhood. She shows in particular that pronatalist propaganda pushes women to be convinced that childbearing is a national duty, at the same time as an accomplishment of their nature. In her review of the book, the historian Marie-France Morel writes that Thébaud proposes "new issues in the history of women", as well as a questioning of the medical power and the functioning of maternities.

In 1995, she co-founded the history journal, Clio. Femmes, genre, histoire, serving as its co-director from 1995 to 2012. In 2003, she was co-editing it with Michelle Zancarini-Fournel; in 2008, she was co-editing it with Rebecca Rogers. Until 2009, she served as president of the Mnémosyne (association) association for the development of the history of women and gender.

Thébaud edited volume 5 of Le XXe siècle (from the Histoire des femmes collection, Plon-Laterza, 1992; reissue completed in paperback in 2002) and published Écrire l'histoire des femmes (ENS Éditions, 1998). She also co-edited Féminismes et identités nationales (Feminisms and National Identities) (Lyon, Center Jacques Cartier, 1998) and Le Siècle des féminismes (Editions de l'Atelier, 2004). Her La Femme au temps de la Guerre de 14 (Paris: Stock, 1986; revised ed. 2014), is considered the classic work regarding the experience of French women during World War I.

== Awards and honours ==
- 2017, Chevalier of the Légion d'honneur

== Selected works ==
=== Books ===
- Les femmes au temps de la guerre de 14, Paris, Petit Bibliothèque Payot, 2013
- Écrire l'histoire des femmes et du genre, Lyon, ENS éditions, 2007.
- Écrire l'histoire des femmes, preface by Alain Corbin, Coll. Sociétés, espaces, temps, ENS éditions Fontenay Saint-Cloud, 2nd éd., 1998. 227 p.
- Féminismes et identités nationales. Les processus d’intégration des femmes au politique, Lyon, Programme Rhône-Alpes Recherches en Sciences Humaines, 1998.
- Le siècle des féminismes (with Catherine Jacques, Éliane Gubin, Florence Rochefort, Brigitte Studer and Michelle Zancarini-Fournel), Éditions de l'Atelier, 2004.
- Les Mots de l’histoire des femmes (coécrit avec les membres du comité de rédaction de la revue CLIO, Histoire, Femmes et Sociétés), Toulouse, Presses Universitaires du Mirail, 2004.
- Quand les femmes témoignent. Histoire orale, histoire des femmes, mémoire des femmes (with Geneviève Dermenjian), Paris, Publisud, 2009.
- La fabrique des filles. L’éducation des filles de Jules Ferry à la pilule (with Rebecca Rogers), Paris, Éditions Textuel, 2010.
- La place des femmes dans l’histoire. Une histoire mixte (with Geneviève Dermenjian, Irène Jami, and Annie Rouquier), Paris, Belin éditeur, 2010.
- Quand nos grand-mères donnaient la vie : la maternité en France dans l'entre-deux-guerres, Presses universitaires de Lyon, Coll. médecine et société, 1986.
- Une traversée du siècle. Marguerite Thibert, femme engagée et fonctionnaire internationale, Paris, Belin, 2017, 704 p. (ISBN 978-2-410-00549-3)

=== Articles ===
- "Le rôle des femmes dans la transmission du patrimoine culturel immatériel en Occident", in L’ànima de la humanitat, el patrimoni cultural immaterial, XXV Université d’été d’Andorre, Gouv. d’Andorre, 2009, p. 35-52.
- "Storia delle donne e storia di genere in Francia", Contemporanea. Rivista di storia dell’800 e del’900, Anno XIII, n° 2, 2010, p. 337-342.
- "Le genre de la démocratie au XXè siècle", in De la différence des sexes. Le genre en histoire, edited by Michèle Riot-Sarcey, Larousse, 2010, p. 187-212.
- "Femmes engagées, de la Commune aux années MLF", in Photo/Femmes/Féminisme 1860-2010, edited by Annie Metz and Florence Rochefort, Paris Bibliothèque, 2010, p. 154-157.
- "Réseaux réformateurs et politiques du travail féminin. L’OIT au prisme de la carrière et des engagements de Marguerite Thibert", in L’Organisation internationale du travail. Origine, développement, avenir, edited by Isabelle Lespinet-Moret and Vincent Viet, Presses Universitaires de Rennes, 2011, p. 27-37.
- "Politiques du genre en [sciences humaines : l’exemple de la discipline historique en France", in Langage, genre et sexualité, edited by Alexandre Duchêne and Claudine Moïse, Montréal, Éditions Nota Bene, 2011, p. 27-47.
- "Écrire l’histoire des femmes et du genre : comparaisons et connexions européennes", in Genre, femmes, histoire en Europe, edited by Anna Bellavitis and Nicole Edelman, presses Universitaires de Paris Ouest, 2011, p. 11-33.
- "Construire un espace européen ou construire un espace international. L’exemple de Marguerite Thibert (1886-1982)", in Les rôles transfrontaliers joués par les femmes en Europe, edited by Guyonne Leduc, Paris, L’Harmattan, 2012, p. 267-282.
- "Le privé est politique. Féminismes des années 1970", in Histoire des mouvements sociaux en France de 1814 à nos jours, edited by Michel Pigenet and Danielle Tartakowsky, Paris, La Découverte, 2012, p. 509-520.
