= Michelle Zancarini-Fournel =

French historian (born 1947)

Michelle Zancarini-Fournel Professor Emerita
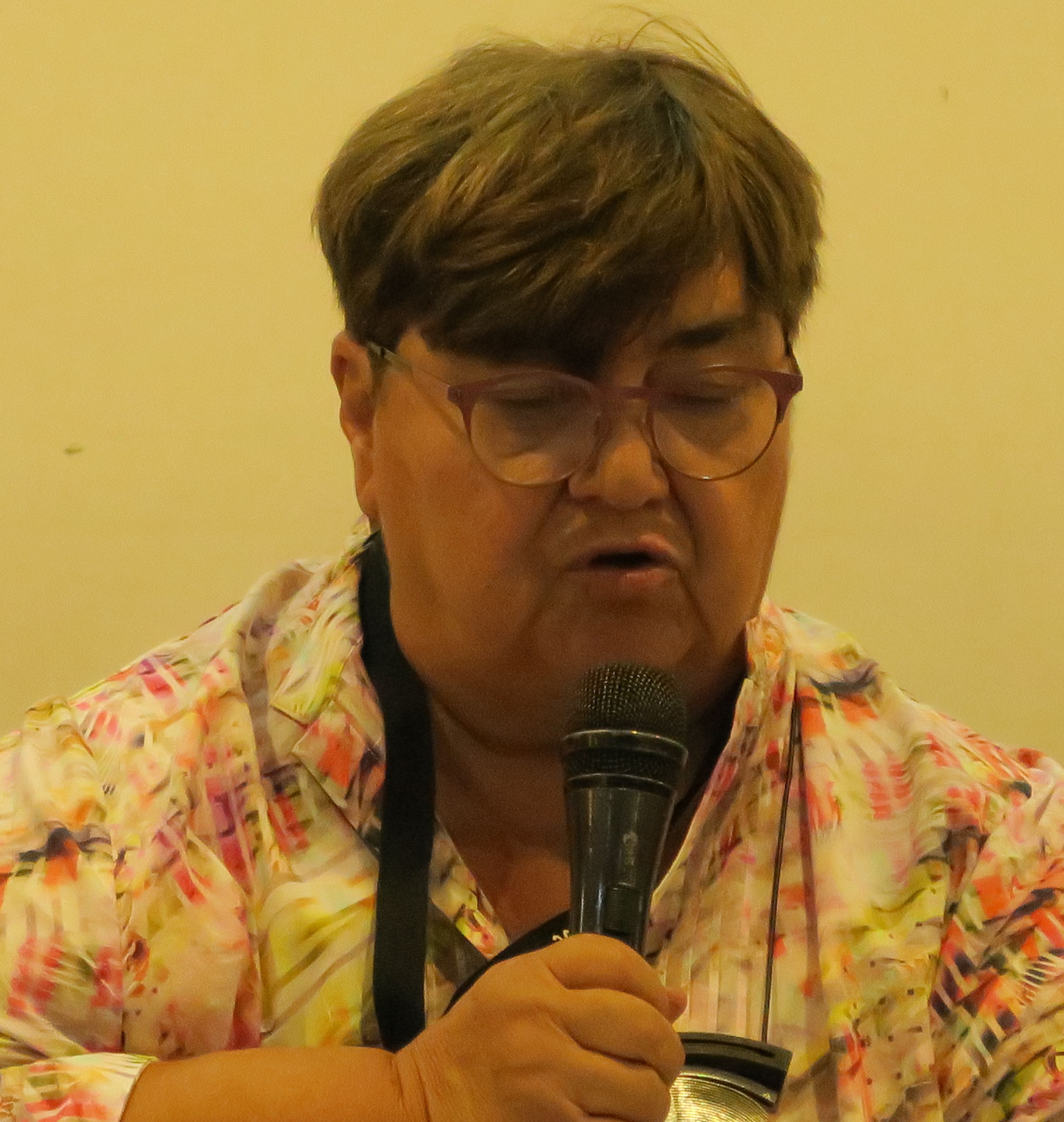
- Born: 1947 (age 78–79)

Academic background
- Education: Paris 1 Panthéon-Sorbonne University; Lumière University Lyon 2
- Doctoral advisor: Yves Lequin

Academic work
- Discipline: History
- Sub-discipline: History of women and gender; May 68
- Institutions: Claude Bernard University Lyon 1; University of Lyon

Michelle Zancarini-Fournel (born 1947) is a French historian. She is professor emeritus of contemporary history at the Claude Bernard University Lyon 1, and former co-director of the semi-annual journal, Clio. Femmes, genre, histoire. Her research focuses on the history of popular movements. She has published books and numerous articles in various journals. She is a specialist in the history of women and gender, as well as May 68.

== Biography ==
Zancarini-Fournel began her career in 1969 as a secondary school teacher. Supervised by Yves Lequin, her doctoral thesis in history was titled, Parcours de femmes : réalités et représentations, Saint-Étienne, 1880-1950 (Women's journey: realities and representations, Saint-Étienne, 1880-1950), which she defended in 1988 at Lumière University Lyon 2.

A specialist in the history of women and gender, Zancarini-Fournel and Françoise Thébaud co-founded the history journal, Clio.

Zancarini-Fournel also specialized in the topic May 68, whose archives she first helped to save, before writing the history of the event. She also focused on the event in her habilitation dissertation, which was partially published in the book she co-edited 68 : une histoire collective (68: une histoire collective).9. In 2016, she published a popular history of France, entitled Les luttes et les rêves (Struggles and Dreams).

== Selected works ==
- Parcours de femmes: réalités et représentations, Saint-Étienne (1880-1950), with Mathilde Dubesset, Lyon, Presses universitaires de Lyon, 1993.
- Différence des sexes et protection sociale, XIXe – XXe siècles, with Leora Auslander, Paris, Presses universitaires de Vincennes, 1995.
- Les Années 68 : le temps de la contestation, with Geneviève Dreyfus-Armand, Robert Frank (historian) and Marie-Françoise Lévy, Complexe/IHTP, 2000.
- Le groupe d'information sur les prisons : archives d'une lutte, 1970-1972, with Philippe Artières, Paris, IMEC, 2001.
- Collectif, Le siècle des féminismes, Paris, l'Atelier, 2004.
- Histoire des femmes en France : XIXe – XXe siècles, Rennes, Presses universitaires de Rennes, 2005.
- Le genre du sport, Toulouse, Presses universitaires du Mirail, 2006 ISBN 9782858168422, 379 pages.
- 68, une histoire collective, 1962-1981, with Philippe Artières, Paris, La Découverte, 2008 ISBN 9782707149961, 847 pages.
- Le moment 68 : une histoire contestée, Paris, Le Seuil, 2008 ISBN 9782020898911, 313 pages.
- Luttes de femmes : 100 ans d'affiches féministes, with Bibia Pavard, Les Echappés, 2013, 136 pages.
- Les luttes et les rêves. Une histoire populaire de la France de 1685 à nos jours, Paris, La Découverte, 2016 ISBN 978-2-35522-088-3, 990 pages.
- Une histoire nationale est-elle encore possible ?, Pessac, Presses universitaires de Bordeaux, 2018 ISBN 979-10-300-0301-7, 80 pages.
- Ne nous libérez pas, on s'en charge. Une histoire des féminismes de 1789 à nos jours, with Bibia Pavard and Florence Rochefort, Paris, La Découverte, 2020 ISBN 978-2-348-05561-4, 510 pages.
- De la défense des savoirs critiques: Quand le pouvoir s'en prend à l'autonomie de la recherche, with Claude Gautier, Paris, La Découverte, 2022 ISBN 9782348073069, 272 pages.
