= Vercheval =

Vercheval is a surname. Notable people with the surname include:

- Frédéric Vercheval, Belgian musician
- Georges Vercheval, Belgian photographer
- Jeanne Vercheval, Belgian social activist and feminist
- Pierre Vercheval, player of Canadian football
