= Kris Lane =

American historian

- Born: Kris Eugene Lane; April 7, 1967 (age 59); Creston, British Columbia, Canada
- Education: University of Colorado Boulder; University of Minnesota
- Awards: Guggenheim Fellowship (2015)
- Scientific career
- Fields: Colonial Latin American history
- Workplaces: Tulane University; College of William and Mary

Kris Eugene Lane (born April 7, 1967) is a Canadian–American Fulbright scholar, researcher, professor, and author. His areas of academic teaching and research focus on colonial Latin American history. He has written and edited several books and articles on slavery, witchcraft, headhunting, mining, human trafficking, and piracy in the Caribbean.

Lane is the Frances V. Scholes Chair of Colonial Latin American History at Tulane University. He previously taught Latin American History at the College of William and Mary in Virginia, is the general editor of the Colonial Latin American Review, and a member of the board of editors of the Hispanic American Historical Review.

== Early life ==
Lane was born in Creston, British Columbia. He is the son of Rustin and Grace Fletcher. He was raised in Colorado, Texas, and British Columbia. Lane is married with one daughter. He attended the University of Colorado Boulder, graduating in 1991 with a bachelor's degree in history and Latin American studies. In 1996, he earned his Ph.D. in history from the University of Minnesota.

== Career ==
In 1997, Lane joined the teaching staff of the College of William and Mary in Virginia, where he taught history. During his employment, he was honored as one of the school's inaugural recipients of the Joseph Plumeri Award, which recognizes the university's faculty for excellence in teaching, research, and community service. He has also served as a visiting professor at the National University of Colombia and the University of Leiden.In 2011, he joined the history department at Tulane University where he has taught courses on an array of subjects including the environmental history of Latin America, piracy, mining, and archive research. He has also worked extensively on the history of the Bolivian city of Potosi and its long history of silver mining.

Lane has traveled extensively in South- and Central America and has written, edited, and collaborated in presenting his research on piracy, slavery, gold mining, headhunting, and witchcraft in colonial Ecuador and Colombia. As of 2010, he serves as the general editor of the interdisciplinary journal Colonial Latin American Review.

He has also edited and wrote the introduction for Bernardo Vargas Machuca's work, Indian Militia and Description of the Indies and Defense and Discourse of the Western Conquests, following their translations from Spanish. Published in Madrid, the two works were training manuals for conquistadors, written in 1599 by Vargas, as an extension of his military service in Italy and South America.

== Awards ==
- 2005: Fulbright Lecture Research Fellowship
- 2005: Edwin Lieuwen Memorial Prize for Teaching, awarded by the Rocky Mountain Council of Latin American Studies
- 2009: Joseph Plumeri Award for Faculty Excellence

== Published works ==
=== Books ===
- Pillaging the Empire: Piracy in the Americas, 1500–1700. Armonk: M. E. Sharpe. 1998. ISBN 9780765602565.
- Quito 1599: City and Colony in Transition. Albuquerque: University of New Mexico Press. 2002. ISBN 9780826323569.
- Colour of Paradise: The Emerald in the Age of Gunpowder Empires. New Haven: Yale University Press. 2010. ISBN 9780300161311.
- Latin America in Colonial Times. With Restall, M. Cambridge: Cambridge University Press. 2011. ISBN 9780521132602.
- Crossroads and Cultures Vol. II: Since 1300. With Smith, B., Mieroop, M., Glahn, R. Boston: Bedford/St. Martin's. 2012. ISBN 9780312559861.
- Potosí: The Silver City That Changed the World. Oakland: University of California Press. 2019. ISBN 9780520280847.

=== Journals ===
- Lane, Kris (April 2000). "The transition from Encomienda to slavery in seventeenth-century Barbacoas (Colombia)". Slavery & Abolition. 21 (1): 73–95. doi:10.1080/01440390008575296. S2CID 143637744.
- Lane, Kris E. (October 2000). "Captivity and Redemption: Aspects of Slave Life in Early Colonial Quito and Popayan". The Americas. 57 (2). The Academy of American Franciscan History: 225–246. doi:10.1353/tam.2000.0011. S2CID 144284361.
- Lane, Kris (2009). "Memorias robadas: reflexiones sobre archivos, historia y poder". Jahrbuch für Geschichte Lateinamerikas. 46: 167–176. doi:10.7767/jbla.2009.46.1.167.
- Lane, Kris (April 2011). "Gone Platinum: Contraband and Chemistry in Eighteenth-Century Colombia". Colonial Latin American Review. 20 (1): 61–79. doi:10.1080/10609164.2011.552549. S2CID 161626345.
