= Françoise Collin =

Belgian novelist, philosopher and feminist (1928–2012)

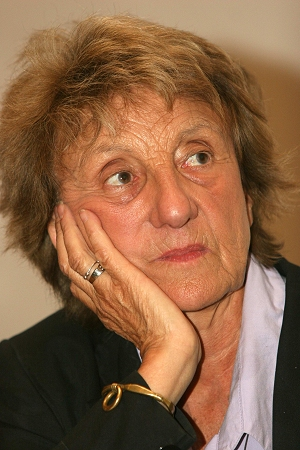
- Born: 8 April 1928; Braine-le-Comte, Belgium
- Died: 1 September 2012 (aged 84); Saint-Sauveur, Belgium
- Education: Université Libre de Bruxelles, Paris (studies under Jean Hyppolite and Maurice Merleau-Ponty)
- Occupations: Novelist, philosopher and feminist
- Known for: Founder of Les Cahiers du GRIF; contributions to feminist philosophy; introducing Hannah Arendt to French audiences
- Notable work: Maurice Blanchot et la question de l'écriture; Hannah Arendt. L'homme est-il devenu superflu?
- Awards: Co-founder of UNESCO's Revue des femmes-philosophes (2010)

Françoise Collin (8 April 1928, Braine-le-Comte – 1 September 2012) was a Belgian novelist, philosopher and feminist.

Known for her contributions to contemporary French philosophy and feminist theory, she was one of the first intellectuals to introduce the work of Hannah Arendt to French audiences. She was also the founder of Les Cahiers du GRIF, the first French-language feminist journal, and played a central role in shaping feminist thought in the Francophone world.

== Life ==
=== Early life and education ===
Françoise Collin was born in Braine-le-Comte, Belgium. She studied philosophy at the Université Libre de Bruxelles before continuing her studies in Paris, where she attended courses by Jean Hyppolite and Maurice Merleau-Ponty. She developed a deep interest in the work of Maurice Blanchot, writing a thesis on his thought, which was later published as Maurice Blanchot et la question de l'écriture in 1971.

=== Career ===
In the 1960s, she published several novels, gaining recognition in French literary circles before turning her focus more fully to philosophical and feminist writing.

Françoise Collin published two novels and collaborated on the first series of the magazine Luna-Park.

She studied women authors including Ingeborg Bachmann, Gertrude Stein and Marieluise Fleisser. She was one of the first to introduce Hannah Arendt's work into the French philosophical and feminist fields.

Collin co-organized the first French conference on Arendt in 1985 and published Hannah Arendt. L'homme est-il devenu superflu ? (Odile Jacob, 1999), where she explored central Arendtian concepts such as natality, singularity, and plurality. She also promoted new French translations of Arendt's works and helped bring Rahel Varnhagen out of obscurity.

She traveled to the United States in 1972, and on her return in 1973 created the first French-language feminist journal, Les Cahiers du Grif. She edited with Hedwige Peemans-Poullet GRIF-Université des femmes, she directed the Grif collection at Minuit editions and the Littérales collection at Tierce editions. In 2010, she co-founded the Revue des femmes-philosophes de l'Unesco.

In addition to academic work, she helped create several feminist institutions, including the Université des femmes (1979–1982) and the Belgian feminist network Sophia, which emerged after a GRIF colloquium in 1989.

=== Death and legacy ===
Françoise Collin died on 1 September 2012 in Saint-Sauveur, Belgium, at the age of 84. In the years following her death, numerous tributes were published in academic journals and feminist publications, celebrating her intellectual legacy and her foundational role in shaping feminist discourse in the French-speaking world. Her posthumous collection Un héritage sans testament was published in 2020, offering a reflective overview of her contributions to philosophy and feminism.

== Works ==
- Le Jour fabuleux, Éditions du Seuil, 1960.
- Rose qui peut, Le Seuil, 1963
- 331W20 President's Election, Transedition, 1975.
- Le Rendez-vous, Tierce, 1988
- Le Jardin de Louise, La Barre du jour 1988
- On dsemble une ville, Éditions des Femmes, 2008.
