= Jacqueline Coutras =

French geographer (born 1942)

- Born: 1942 (age 83–84)
- Occupation: Geographer
- Known for: feminist geography
- Notable work: Urban crisis and gendered spaces

Jacqueline Coutras (born in 1942) is a French geographer who is a researcher at the French National Centre for Scientific Research (CNRS). A pioneer of gender geography in France, she, along with Jeanne Fagnani, took part in the institutionalization of international feminist geography.

In her 1996 book Urban crisis and gendered spaces she addressed the issue of sexual spatial asymmetries, and showed that if women have expanded the space to which they were traditionally confined through access to paid work and car driving, they nevertheless were not able to achieve full access to all spaces of socialization. Cities remain unequal spaces.

== Biography ==
Coutras defended her post-graduate thesis in 1975 under the direction of Jacqueline Beaujeu-Garnier, on "economic activity zones and development in the western part of the Paris region". She holds the academic title agrégée in geography. She is a CNRS researcher at the Institut de recherche sur les sociétés contemporaines (Iresco).

== Work in the field of feminist geography ==
Coutras published feminist studies on women, their urban practices and spatial behaviors as soon as the end of the 1970s. She is a pioneer in gender geography and considered "an important reference for all feminist geographers".

=== Feminist geography ===
Coutras attempted to found a feminist geography along with Jeanne Fagnani while still remaining in the social geography field. Together they make «women» a research category in the academic setting. They intervened in the academic journal Les Cahiers du GRIF, an emblematic place of the european feminist research until it disappeared in 1982. Their approaches are marked by a feminist and marxist discourse.

Her pioneering work in feminist geography was contested by some emblematic researchers of French social geography, but later paved the way for a feminist geography.

During the national colloquium "Women, Feminism and Research", which brought together nearly a hundred people in Toulouse in December 1982, Coutras moderated and synthesized a debate entitled "Women and Spaces". In 1982 she also intervened at the colloquium of Lyon of social geography, on the issue of "the city from a feminine perspective" during a session titled "the behavior of the social groups".

With Jeanne Fagnani, she took part in the institutionalization of international feminist geography by participating in the "round table" on "women in geography" organized and moderated by Janice Monk and Maria Dolors García Ramón, during the regional conference on Mediterranean countries held in Barcelona in September 1986.

=== Crise urbaine et espaces sexués ===
In her 1996 book Crise urbaine et espaces sexués, she took advantage of the urban crisis in France to explore the question of sexual spatial asymmetries. She explained that, thanks to paid work and access to driving women had pushed back the limits of the spaces traditionally devoted to them in residential space to conquer the functional city, without however managing to access the socializing city. City spaces remain unequal, and public policies privileges the needs of men.

In her critical review of the book, Nicole Brais summarized it by mentioning that:

The city of intersubjectivity is one of encounters, of chance, of adventure, of strolling. This presupposes a feeling of security in the "other", a certain form of anonymity. It is in the conjunction of these two elements, security and anonymity, that we can explain that the flâneurs are not flâneuses. Women do not experience, in the public space, the security necessary to be available and disposed to meeting, to the unusual.

Because of the lack of a specific field of gender or feminist geography in France, her work was subsequently forgotten. She explained in 1999 that :

Perhaps we should have sought to create a "feminist geography" like our Anglo-Saxon and Quebecois colleagues. This has not been the case. This attitude has been typically French, and other disciplines have applied it as well. It was adopted out of fear of ghettoization.

== Publications ==
=== Books ===
- Coutras, Jacqueline (2003). Les peurs urbaines et l'autre sexe (in French). Paris; Budapest; Torino: L'Harmattan. ISBN 2-7475-5237-3.
- Jacqueline Coutras et Rosa Ester Rossini (1997). Mobilité quotidienne des femmes, notion de genre et études urbaines : comparaison Paris-Sao Paulo (in French). Paris – via Institut de recherche sur les sociétés contemporaines.
- Jacqueline Coutras (1996). Crise urbaine et espaces sexués (in French). Paris. ISBN 2-200-01374-4 – via Armand Colin.
- Jacqueline Coutras (1987). Des villes traditionnelles aux nouvelles banlieues. L'espace public au féminin (in French). Paris: SEDES.
- "Espaces sexués et géographie française : bonheur et malheur d'une géographe". Discours scientifiques et contextes culturels : géographies britanniques et françaises à l'épreuve postmoderne (in French). Talence: Maison des sciences de l'homme d'Aquitaine. 1999. pp. 75–90. ISBN 978-2-85892-270-3. OCLC 301649295..

=== Articles ===
- Cooutras, Jacqueline. "Construction sexuée de l'espace urbain". www.habiter-autrement.org (in French).
- Coutras, Jacqueline (1987). "Hommes et femmes dans l'espace public français depuis un siècle". Cahiers de géographie du Québec (in French). 31 (83): 143–155. doi:10.7202/021872ar. ISSN 0007-9766..
- Coutras, Jacqueline (1997). "La mobilité quotidienne et les inégalités de sexe à travers le prisme des statistiques". Recherches féministes (in French). 10 (2): 77–90. doi:10.7202/057936ar. ISSN 0838-4479..
- Coutras, Jacqueline (1989). "Les pratiques spatiales des sexes : quelles problématiques ?". Espace Populations Sociétés (in French). 7 (1): 111–115. doi:10.3406/espos.1989.1364..
- Coutras, Jacqueline (2002). "Violences urbaines et restauration de l'identité spatiale masculine". Espace Populations Sociétés (in French). 20 (3): 295–307. doi:10.3406/espos.2002.2041..
- Coutras, Jacqueline; Fagnani, J. (1978-03-12). "Femmes et transports en milieu urbain". International Journal of Urban and Regional Research (in French). 2 (1–3): 432–439. doi:10.1111/j.1468-2427.1978.tb00760.x..

== Notes and references ==
=== Bibliography ===
- Brais Nicole (1997). "Jacqueline Coutras - Crise urbaine et espaces sexués. (1996). Paris. Armand Colin". Cahiers du GEDISST (in French) (18): 177–179.
- Ginsburger Nicolas (2017). "Femmes en géographie au temps des changements. Féminisation et féminisme dans le champ disciplinaire français et international (1960-1990)". L'Espace géographique (in French). 46: 236–263. doi:10.3917/eg.463.0236.
- Hancock, Claire (2020). "Les études de genre ont-elles transformé la géographie française ?". Histoire de la recherche contemporaine. 9 (1): 45–54. doi:10.4000/hrc.4182. S2CID 230617674.
