= Marc Van De Mieroop =

Belgian Assyriologist and Egyptologist (born 1956)

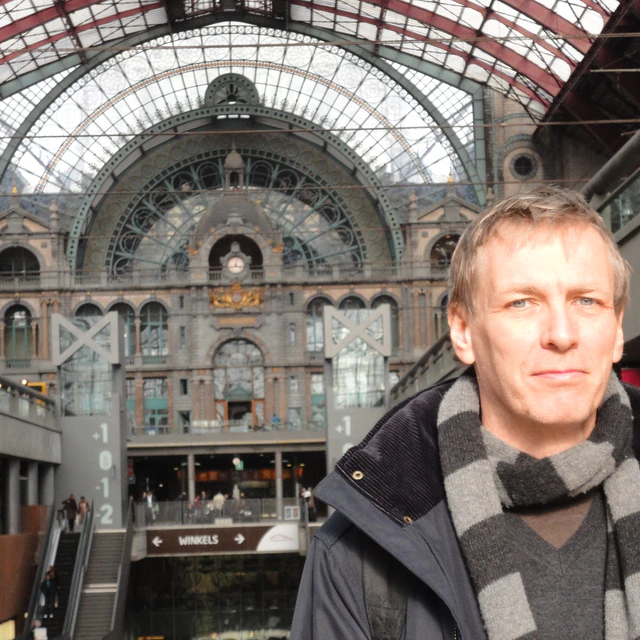
- Born: 22 October 1956 (age 69); Belgium
- Citizenship: Belgian
- Education: Ph.D., Yale University, 1983; MA, Yale University, 1980; BA, Katholieke Universiteit Leuven, 1978
- Occupation: Assyriologist
- Children: Kenan Van De Mieroop
- Awards: 2013 Guggenheim Fellowship

Marc Van De Mieroop (born 22 October 1956) is a noted Belgian Assyriologist and Egyptologist who has been full professor of Ancient Near Eastern history at Columbia University since 1996.

== Biography ==
Van de Mieroop was born in Belgium to a prominent Flemish family who paternally descend from Jan I van Cuijk. He received his bachelor's degree from the Katholieke Universiteit Leuven, later attending Yale University, where he received his master's degree in 1980 and his doctoral degree in 1983. He taught at Yale and Oxford, later becoming a full professor at Columbia in 1996.

Van De Mieroop specializes in the history of the Ancient Near East from the beginning of writing to the age of Alexander the Great, with a particular interest in the socio-economic and political history of the Ancient Near East. He has written extensively on historical methodology and was a Senior Fellow at the Internationales Forschungszentrum Kulturwissenschaften in 2011, and a Guggenheim Fellow in 2013. In 2016 he held a fellowship from the ACLS for a project entitled, "Babylonian Cosmopolitanism and the Birth of Greek and Hebrew Literate Traditions." He is a member of the editorial board for Journal of Ancient History.

== Publications ==
In addition to his articles and translations, his book publications include:

- Crafts in the Early Isin Period (1987)
- Sumerian Administrative Documents from the Reigns of Ishbi-Erra and Shu-Ilishu (1987)
- Society and Enterprise in Old Babylonian Ur (1992)
- The Ancient Mesopotamian City (1997 and 1999) Oxford University Press, Oxford;ISBN 978-0-19-815286-6
- Cuneiform Texts and the Writing of History (1999)
- King Hammurabi of Babylon (2005) Blackwell, Oxford. ISBN 978-1-4051-2660-1
- The Eastern Mediterranean in the Age of Ramesses II (2007) Wiley-Blackwell, Oxford; ISBN 978-1-4051-6069-8
- with Bonnie Smith, Richard von Glahn, and Kris Lane, Crossroads and Cultures. A History of the World's Peoples (2012), Bedford-St. Martin; ISBN 0-312-57317-0
- A History of the Ancient Near East, ca. 3000–323 BC (2015) Wiley-Blackwell, Oxford; ISBN 978-1118718162
- Philosophy before the Greeks. The Pursuit of Truth in Ancient Babylonia (2015), Princeton University Press; ISBN 978-0691157184
- A History of Ancient Egypt (2021) Wiley-Blackwell, Oxford; ISBN 978-1-119-62087-7
- The Practice of Ancient Near Eastern History - Opera Minora (2022) (Alter Orient und Altes Testament 400), Ugarit Verlag: Münster; ISBN 978-3-86835-336-5
- Before and After Babel: Writing as Resistance in Ancient Near Eastern Empires (2023) Oxford University Press, New York; ISBN 978-0-19-763466-0

== See also ==
- Columbia University: Marc Van De Mieroop
- Archaeology Magazine Interview
- Philosophy Interview
- On Bronze Age Collapse, BBC, The Forum
