= Elena Sisto =

American painter based in New York (born 1952)

Elena Sisto (born 1952, in Boston, MA) is an American painter based in New York.

Her work is influenced by Philip Guston, Henri Matisse, Pierre Bonnard, and other modernist artists. She is known for her figurative paintings laden with symbolic meaning, that frequently focus on the experience of being a woman artist. In an essay published in March 2016, critic and former Museum of Modern Art curator Robert Storr compared Sisto to contemporary artists Carroll Dunham and Dana Schutz.

Sisto received her BA in art from Brown University and Rhode Island School of Design in 1977, and studied at the New York Studio School (with Nicholas Carone), the Skowhegan School of Painting and Sculpture and Yale Norfolk. She is a 2013 recipient of the John Simon Guggenheim Memorial Foundation Fellowship (see also: List of Guggenheim Fellowships awarded in 2013), two National Endowment for the Arts Visual Artist's Fellowships (1983–84 and 1989–90), the Inglis Griswold Nelson Prize from the National Academy Museum and School (2008), and fellowships from the Hand Hollow Foundation (1995), Peter S. Reed Foundation (1999), Yaddo (2007), The Fine Arts Work Center (1996) and the Millay Colony (1987).

Sisto has presented solo shows at the Katzen Museum of Art at American University, the Maier Museum, The Greenville County Museum, and the Miami Dade Museum of Art + Design. She has been included in numerous museum exhibitions, including the 43rd Biennial of Contemporary American Painting at The Corcoran Gallery in Washington, DC, the Wexner Center for the Arts, Katonah Museum of Art, the Hunterdown Museum of Art, and the Weatherspoon Gallery.

Her work has been the subject of essays by Stephen Westfall, Robert Storr, Debra Bricker Balken, Carol Kino, Hearne Pardee, and inspired the fiction piece Pan's Fair Throng by novelist Rick Moody. Mentions and reviews of Sisto's exhibitions have appeared in publications including the New York Times, New Yorker magazine, Artcritical, Artforum, Art in America, Art News, Arts, The Brooklyn Rail, Los Angeles Times, and Modern Painters.

Her work is currently represented by Lori Bookstein Fine Art in New York City. Past representation includes Jackie Littlejohn Gallery, Germans Van Eck Gallery, Damon Brandt Gallery, and Vanderwoude Tannenbaum Gallery.
