= Kristen A. Stilt =

- Education: JD from The University of Texas School of Law and a PhD in History and Middle Eastern Studies from Harvard University
- Scientific career
- Fields: Islamic studies
- Workplaces: Harvard Law School

Kristen A. Stilt is an Islamic studies scholar who focuses on law and society in both historical and contemporary contexts. She wrote Islamic Law in Action: Authority, Discretion, and Everyday Experiences in Mamluk Egypt.

== Education ==
Stilt earned a JD from the University of Texas School of Law. Stilt earned a PhD in History and Middle Eastern Studies from Harvard University.

== Career ==
In 2013, Stilt was awarded a Guggenheim Fellowship for her work in constitutional law. Currently, Stilt is a Director of the Islamic Legal Studies Programs at Harvard Law School. In the past, Stilt has won Fulbright and Fulbright-Hays awards.

== Works ==
- Stilt, Kristen A. "Contextualizing Constitutional Islam: The Malaysian Experience," 13 Int'l J. Const. L. 407 (2015).
- Stilt, Kristen A. "Constitutions in Authoritarian Regimes: the Case of Egypt" in Constitutions in Authoritarian Regimes 111 (Tom Ginsburg & Alberto Simper eds., University of Chicago Press, 2013).
- Stilt, Kristen A. Islamic Law in Action: Authority, Discretion, and Everyday Experiences in Mamluk Egypt (Oxford University Press 2011) ISBN 0199602433.
