= Ann Pibal =

American painter

- Born: 1969 (age 56–57); Minneapolis, MN
- Education: Undergraduate degree from St. Olaf College, Northfield, MN (1991), MA, MFA in Painting from The University of Iowa, Iowa City (1995).
- Website: annpibal.com

Ann Pibal (born 1969, Minneapolis, MN) is an American painter who makes geometric compositions using acrylic paint on aluminum panel. The geometric intensity is one of the key characteristics that defines her paintings.

Pibal is widely recognized as she has had many of her paintings exhibited around the globe (United States, Europe, and Asia). She has even been featured in a variety or articles ranging from Art Critical, ARTFORUM, and the FRIEZE Magazine. She was the recipient of a 2013 Guggenheim Fellowship and her work is in the collection of the Brooklyn Museum of Art, Brooklyn, NY, Hirshhorn Museum, Smithsonian Institution, Washington D.C., and the Yale University Art Gallery, New Haven, CT, among others. She lives and works in Brooklyn, NY and North Bennington, VT.

== Early life and education ==
Ann Pibal was born in Minneapolis, MN in 1969. She received her undergraduate degree from St. Olaf College, Northfield, MN in 1991 and her MA and MFA in Painting from The University of Iowa, Iowa City in 1995.

== Teaching ==
Pibal has been on the Bennington College faculty since 1998.

== Collections ==
Pibal's work is in the following public collections: Brooklyn Museum of Art, Brooklyn, NY; Colby College Museum of Art, Waterville, ME; Farnsworth Art Museum, Rockland, ME; Hirshhorn Museum, Smithsonian Institution, Washington D.C.; Museum of Fine Arts, Boston, MA; Savannah College of Art and Design, Savannah GA; and the Tang Teaching Museum and Art Gallery, Saratoga Springs, NY.

== Selected exhibitions ==
Pibal has had solo exhibitions at: team gallery, New York (2018), Lucien Terras, Inc. (2015), New York, NY; Steven Zevitas Gallery, Boston, MA (2013); Meulensteen, New York, NY(2011); Max Protetch, New York, NY (2010); The Suburban, Chicago IL (2010); Max Protetch, New York, NY (2008); Schmidt Contemporary, St. Louis, MO (2008); Jessica Murray Projects, New York, NY (2004). She has participated in group exhibitions at numerous venues including The Brooklyn Museum, The Museum of Fine Arts, Boston, Atlanta Contemporary, and MoMA P.S.1.

Surf Type (Dec 6th 2018 – Jan 19th 2019): Drawing parallels between surfing and painting

LUXTC (Jun 24, 2018 - Aug 05, 2018)

Expanding Abstraction: New England Women Painters, 1950 to Now (Apr 7, 2017 - Sept 17, 2017)

Intimacy in Discourse: Reasonable Sized Paintings (Oct 18, 2015 - Dec 22, 2015)

== Awards ==
- The McDowell Colony, Milton Avery Foundation Fellow (2015)
- The John Simon Memorial Guggenheim Foundation, Fellowship (2013)
- 2013 The Rappaport Prize, DeCordova Museum
- American Academy of Arts and Letters, Purchase Award (2012)
- The Louis Comfort Tiffany Foundation, Biennial Award for Visual Art (2009)
- Joan Mitchell Foundation, Painters and Sculptors Fellowship (2008)
- American Academy of Arts and Letters, Purchase Award (2007)
- The Pollock-Krasner Foundation, Fellowship Grant in Painting (2006)
- New York Foundation for the Arts, Fellowship Grant in Painting (2006)
- Yaddo, Artist Residency (2004)
- Cité International des Arts, Artist Residency, Paris France (2002)
- The MacDowell Colony, Artist Residency (2001)
- Saltonstall Foundation, Individual Artist Grant (1998)
- UCROSS Foundation, Artist Residency (1998)
