= Eleni Varikas =

Greek-born French political philosopher and academic (1949–2026)

- Ελένη Βαρίκα
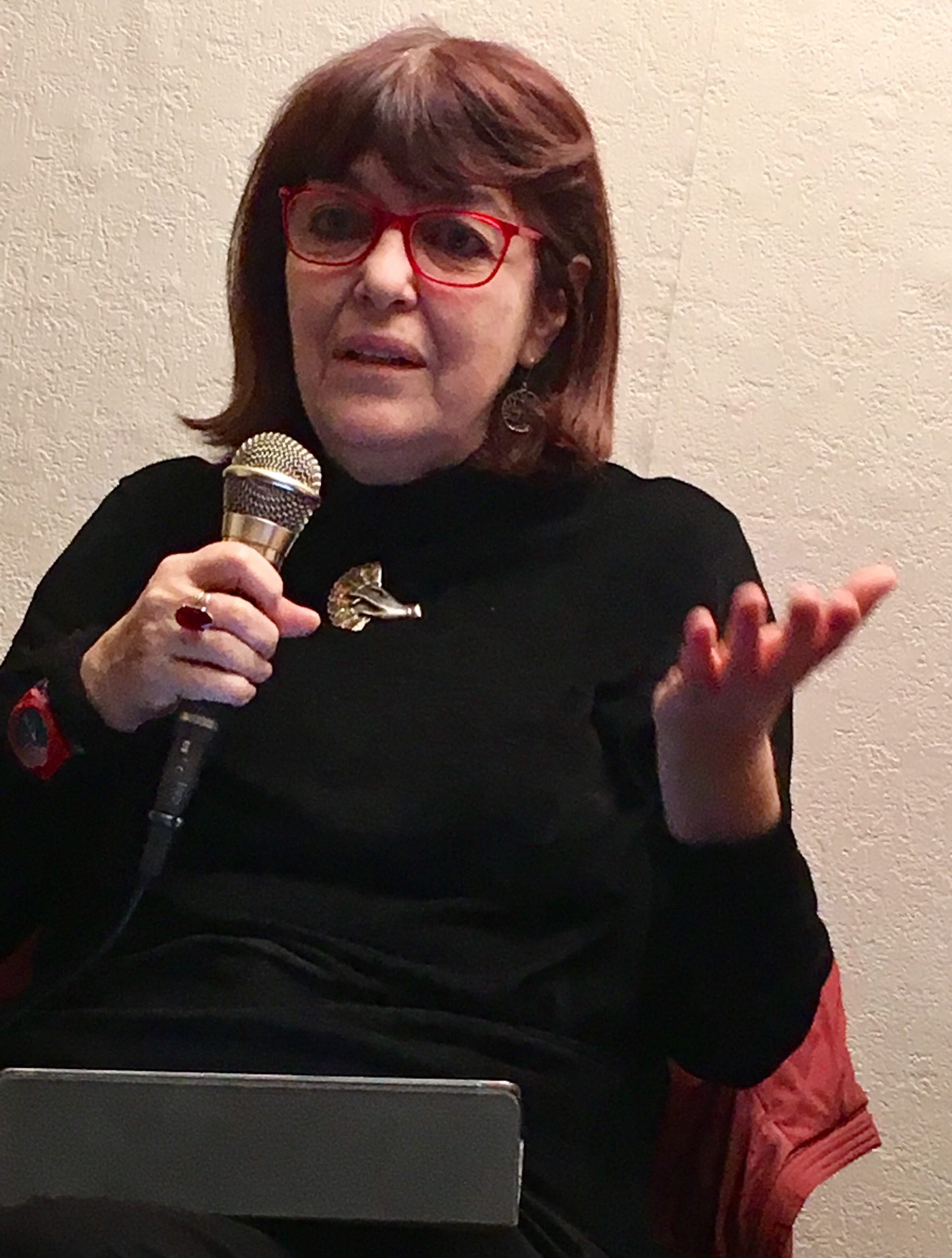
- Varikas in 2017
- Born: 16 March 1949; Athens, Greece
- Died: 9 January 2026 (aged 76); Paris, France
- Education: National and Kapodistrian University of Athens; School for Advanced Studies in the Social Sciences (Maîtrise); Paris Diderot University (DND)
- Occupation: Political philosopher

Eleni Varikas (Greek: Ελένη Βαρίκα; 16 March 1949 – 9 January 2026) was a Greek political philosopher and academic. Also a professor of gender studies, she conducted research for Paris 8 University and the French National Centre for Scientific Research.

== Life and career ==
Born in Athens on 16 March 1949, Varikas was the daughter of literary critic Vasos Varikas. As a history student at the National and Kapodistrian University of Athens, she traveled to Paris during the events of May 68, which inspired her to become an activist against the Greek junta. She returned to Paris in 1971 to pursue a maîtrise at the School for Advanced Studies in the Social Sciences, focusing on the origins of communism in Greece. She again returned to Athens in 1974 and participated in the founding of a feminist movement. In 1975, she was tried in Athens for adapting into Greek The Little Red Schoolbook, a banned libertarian work, but she was acquitted by judge Christos Sartzetakis. In 1986, she completed her Diplôme national de doctorat at Paris Diderot University with a thesis titled La Révolte des Dames. From 1988 to 1991, she was a lecturer at the School for Advanced Studies in the Social Sciences and Paris Diderot University. She was also a visiting professor at several international universities, namely Harvard University, Columbia University, The New School, the University of São Paulo, and the State University of Campinas.

Varikas died of lung cancer in Paris, on 9 January 2026, at the age of 76.

== Publications ==
- Gender and History. Retrospect and Prospect (2000)
- Penser le sexe et le genre (2006)
- Les rebuts du monde, Figures du Paria (2007)
- Les Femmes de Platon à Derrida : Anthologie Critique
- Sous les sciences sociales, le genre (2010)
- Genre et postcolonialismes; dialogues transcontinentaux
- Pour une théorie féministe du politique (2017)
