= L.S. Asekoff =

American poet and professor emeritus

- Born: December 17, 1939 (age 86); Waltham, Massachusetts, United States
- Occupations: Poet, Professor
- Partner: Mary Louise Kalin
- Writing career
- Period: Contemporary
- Notable works: The Gate of Horn, The Widows of Gravesend
- Notable awards: Guggenheim Fellowship, Witter Bynner, National Endowment for the Arts, New York Foundation for the Arts, Fund for Poetry, Jerome Shestack Prize

Louis S. Asekoff (born December 17, 1939) is an American poet and professor emeritus. Asekoff often incorporates surrealist imagery and monologue into his poetry, which is concerned with both the imagistic and aural dimensions of language. Asekoff's unconventional use of monologue as a poetic instrument is suggestive of "the inability of words to properly convey meaning" and a vehicle for implicating the readers who become "members of his poetic universe." In 2012, Poet laureate Philip Levine, who selected Asekoff for the Witter Bynner Poetry Prize, described Asekoff as "a true surreal visionary."

Asekoff taught poetry and coordinated the MFA Poetry Program at Brooklyn College for 42 years, where he also served as a Faculty Associate for The Wolfe Institute for Humanities.

Derek Mahon’s poem “The Snow Party” was dedicated to Asekoff.

== Background ==
Asekoff was born in Waltham, Massachusetts, a small industrial city near Boston. The son of a psychiatrist, he grew up on the grounds of the psychiatric hospitals Danvers State and Metropolitan State Hospital.

== Selected publications ==
=== Books ===
- Dreams of a Work (1994, Orchises Press)
- North Star (1997, Orchises Press)
- The Gate of Horn (2010, Triquarterly)
- Freedom Hill: a poem (2011, Triquarterly).

=== Selected Poems Online ===
- Academy of American Poets
- ColdFront Magazine
- Slate
- Boston Review
- The Cortland Review
- The New Yorker
- Poetry
- "Penn Sound". writing.upenn.edu.

== Selected awards ==
- Guggenheim Fellowship, Poetry, 2013
- Witter Bynner Fellowship, 2012
- Pushcart, 2011
- NEA Literature Fellowship Recipient, 1997
- NYFA Fellowship, Poetry, 1997
- Jerome J. Shestack Poetry Prize, 1993
- Fund for Poetry
