= Natalie Mahowald =

American Earth scientist

Natalie Marie Mahowald
- Born: 1963 (age 62–63)
- Education: Massachusetts Institute of Technology; University of Michigan; Washington University in St. Louis
- Scientific career
- Workplaces: University of California, Santa Barbara; Stockholm University; Cornell University
- Thesis: Development of a 3-dimensional chemical transport model based on observed winds and use in inverse modeling of the sources of CCl₃F (1996)
- Website: Mahowald Research Group

Natalie Mahowald (born 1963) is an American Earth scientist who is the Irving Porter Church Professor of Engineering at Cornell University. Her research considers atmospheric transport of biogeochemically-relevant species, and the impact of humans on their environments.

== Early life and education ==
Mahowald studied physics and German at Washington University in St. Louis. She moved to the University of Michigan for her graduate studies, where she earned a master's degree in natural resource policy in 1993. After graduating, Mahowald moved to Germany, where she worked as a consultant on air solution. Mahowald was a doctoral student at Massachusetts Institute of Technology (MIT), where she studied atmospheric sciences. She was a postdoctoral scholar at Stockholm University.

== Research and career ==
Mahowald was appointed to faculty at the University of California, Santa Barbara. After leaving UCSB, Mahowald joined the National Center for Atmospheric Research (NCAR), where she studied the incorporation of aerosols. She moved to Cornell University in 2007.

Her research considers natural feedbacks in the climate system and how they respond to climate forcings. Amongst these, she has focused on mineral aerosols, fire, the carbon cycle and methane. Aerosols are small particles that cause haze, harm human health and damage air quality. Alongside her work on aerosols, Mahowald has studied soilborne plant pathogens.

In 2017, Mahowald was selected by the United Nations' Intergovernmental Panel on Climate Change (IPCC) to be lead author on the “Special Report on Global Warming of 1.5 degrees Celsius,”. The report evaluated the costs, benefits, tradeoffs and synergies that look to achieve global warming below 1.5 °C. It revealed the finding that a 0.5 °C temperature increase would result in extreme effects on weather events.

== Awards and honors ==
- 2006 American Meteorological Society Henry G. Houghton Award
- 2011 American Meteorological Society Fellow
- 2013 Elected Fellow of the American Geophysical Union
- 2013 Appointed Guggenheim Foundation Fellow
- 2015 Thomson ISI Highly Cited Researcher
- 2018 United Nations Intergovernmental Panel on Climate Change Report Chief Author
- 2019 Cornell University Research Excellence Award
- 2019 Cornell University Provost Research Innovation Award
- 2020 Elected Fellow of the American Association for the Advancement of Science

== Selected publications ==
- Jickells, T. D.; An, Z. S.; Andersen, K. K.; Baker, A. R.; Bergametti, G.; Brooks, N.; Cao, J. J.; Boyd, P. W.; Duce, R. A.; Hunter, K. A.; Kawahata, H. (2005-04-01). "Global Iron Connections Between Desert Dust, Ocean Biogeochemistry, and Climate". Science. 308 (5718): 67–71. Bibcode:2005Sci...308...67J. doi:10.1126/science.1105959. ISSN 0036-8075. PMID 15802595. S2CID 16985005.</ref>
- Jickells, T. D. (2005-04-01). "Global Iron Connections Between Desert Dust, Ocean Biogeochemistry, and Climate". Science. 308 (5718): 67–71. Bibcode:2005Sci...308...67J. doi:10.1126/science.1105959. ISSN 0036-8075. PMID 15802595. S2CID 16985005.</ref>
- Mahowald, Natalie M.; Baker, Alex R.; Bergametti, Gilles; Brooks, Nick; Duce, Robert A.; Jickells, Timothy D.; Kubilay, Nilgün; Prospero, Joseph M.; Tegen, Ina (2005). "Atmospheric global dust cycle and iron inputs to the ocean". Global Biogeochemical Cycles. 19 (4): n/a. Bibcode:2005GBioC..19.4025M. doi:10.1029/2004GB002402. hdl:11511/68526. ISSN 1944-9224.
