= Rape in Belgium =

In 2004, the incidence of rapes recorded by the police in Belgium was 28.4 per 100,000 people, according to data by UNODC; in 2008 it was 29.5 per 100,000 people. Belgium has been reported as being one of the countries with the highest rate of rape.

== Law ==
Rape in Belgium is defined by Article 375 of the Penal Code as "any act of sexual penetration, of whatever sort and by whatever means, committed on a non-consenting person". Marital rape is also illegal under this law.

Apart from criminal proceedings, committing marital rape has also consequences in a divorce case. The new amendments to the Civil Code regulating marriage and divorce, that came into effect in September 2007, state that any of the spouses, following a divorce, may receive alimony if they need the money, but a spouse who has committed rape or other violent crimes against the other spouse cannot receive alimony. Article 301 reads:

The court may refuse to grant the application for a alimony if the defendant proves that the applicant has committed a serious offense that rendered it impossible to continue living together. Under no circumstances will alimony be given to a spouse who was found guilty of an act referred to in Articles 375, 398-400, 402, 403 or 405 of the Penal Code, committed against the person of the defendant, or an attempt to commit an act referred to in Articles 375, 393, 394 or 397 of the Code against the same person.

== Prevalence ==
In 2011, the Belgian Institute for the Equality of Women and Men published a report on "Women and men in Belgium", which noted that in 2008, according to police report, 87% of victims of rape (89% for collective rape) were female. The survey, carried out by Belgian Institute and titled Experience of men and women in gender based violence, included the following figures:

Relation	Women	Men	Total
Partner	30.8%	5.7%	17.5%
Family	27.4%	16.2%	21.5%
Acquaintance	11.3%	15.8%	13.6%
Work	17.2%	21.9%	19.7%
Unknown	13.3%	40.4%	27.7%

According to De Morgen, from 2009 and 2011 the number of reported rape cases increased from 3,360 to 4,038, an increase of more than 20 percent.

As of 2025 according to reports, there are 11 cases of rape reported daily, but it is estimated that 82% of the sexual assaults and rapes go unreported.

== See also ==
- Rape statistics
