= Bernardo de Vargas Machuca =

Spanish soldier and writer

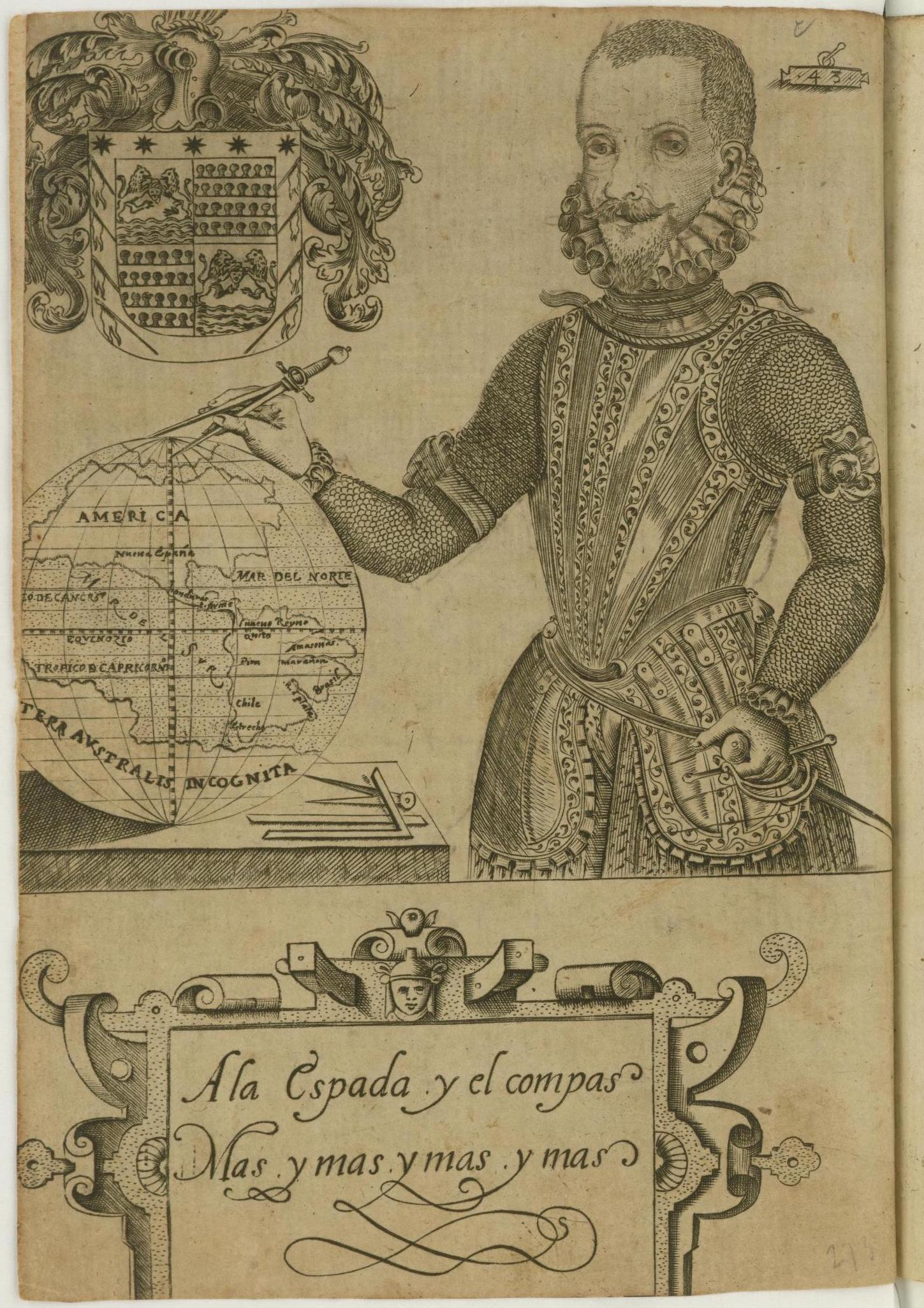
- Born: Simancas, Valladolid
- Died: Madrid
- Occupation(s): Soldier, Writer, Veterinarian, Equestrian

Bernardo de Vargas Machuca (Simancas, 1555 - Madrid, 1622) was a Spanish soldier, writer, naturalist, veterinarian and conquistador.

== Biography ==
Bernardo de Vargas Machuca was born in Simancas, a town in the present-day Province of Valladolid, in 1555 (some sources say 1557), to Juan Vargas, warden of the castle in that town, and Angela de Soto. He completed his studies in the city of Valladolid, enlisting at a very early age in the Spanish Army. He served in Italy and in the colonization of the Americas. During his stay in the American continent he lived in Bogotá, capital city of the New Kingdom of Granada.

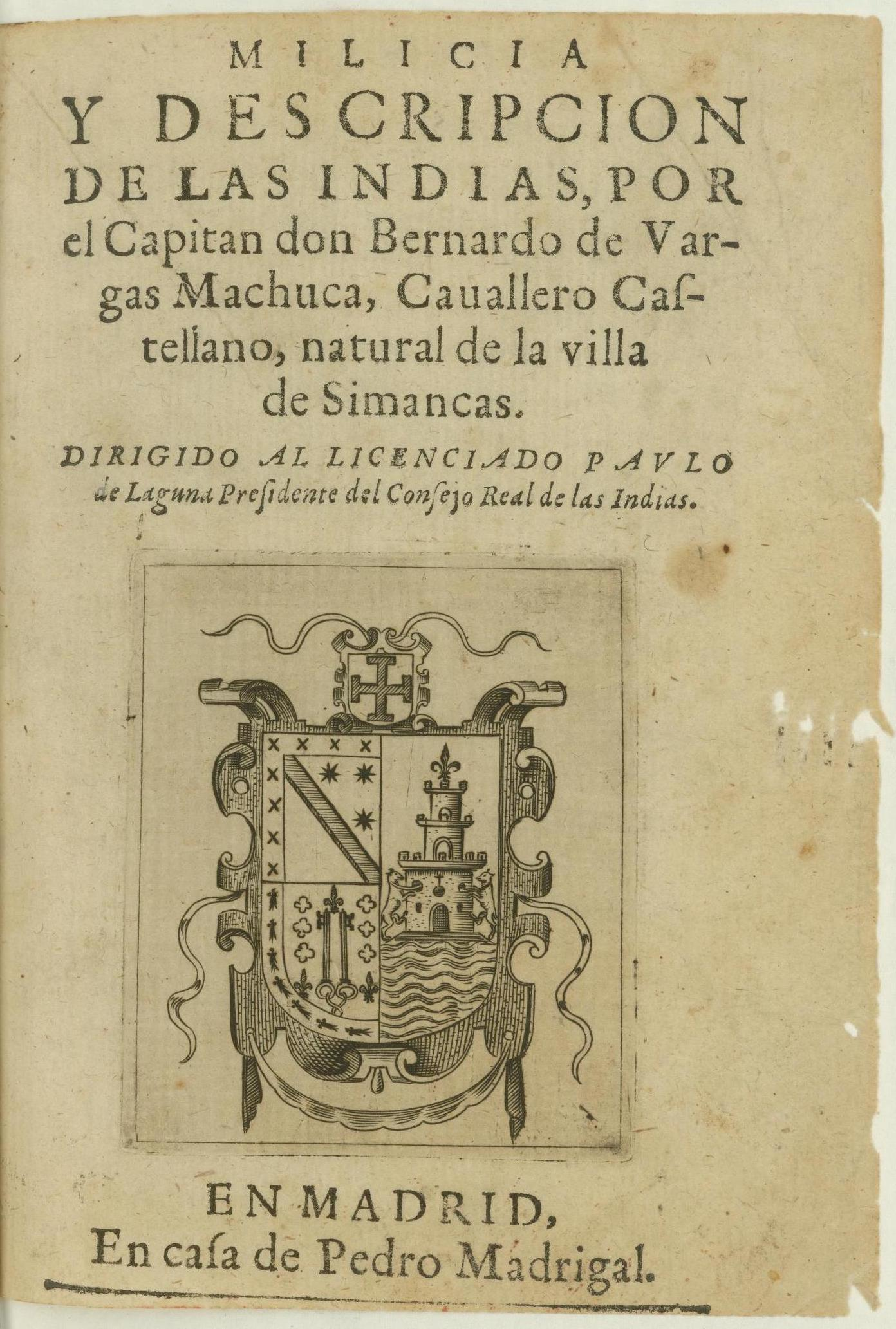
Title page of Bernardo de Vargas Machuca's Milicia Y Descripcion De Las Indias (1599).

After retiring from his military career he settled in the new capital of the Hispanic Monarchy, Madrid. During this period he wrote and published several works in which he collected his impressions and research, including Milicia y descripción de las Indias (The Indian Militia and Description of the Indies) in 1599, also known as Milicia Indiana, a manual intended for Spanish officers serving in the New World. He also published in 1621 Compendio y Doctrina Nueva de la Gineta (Compendium and New Doctrine of Gineta Horsemanship), one of the main studies on Jineta horsemanship of the time, dedicated to Count Alberto Fúcar (Albert Fugger), member of the German House of Fugger, and another essay written around 1603 titled Defensa de la conquista de las Indias (Defense of the Conquest of the Indies), in which he refutes and rejects the ideas and arguments in Bartolomé de las Casas’s A Short Account of the Destruction of the Indies (1552), although it was never published. He died in the Spanish capital in 1622.

== Works ==
- Milicia y descripcion de las Indias, 1599
- Libro de exercicios de la gineta, 1600
- Defensa de la conquista de las Indias, 1603
- Compendio y doctrina nueva de la Gineta, 1621
