= Marie Denis =

Belgian writer and feminist

- Born: Eliane Stas de Richelle; December 4, 1920; Liège, Belgium
- Died: 30 July 2006 (aged 85); Ixelles, Belgium
- Occupation: Writer
- Awards: Prix Victor-Rossel (1967)

Éliane Stas de Richelle, also known as Marie Denis (December 4, 1920 – July 30, 2006) was a Belgian writer and feminist.

== Biography ==
Having married Albert Meeùs, a Belgian magistrate in 1942, she became involved with him in the Catholic movement of the Teams of Our Lady, for which they became responsible in Belgium but resigned in the early 1960s. After giving birth and raising six children, Marie Denis published her first novel in 1961, Des jours trop longs. Wanting to make the ambivalent feminine experience of a pregnancy, as opposed to the natalist injunctions to the "obvious happiness" of motherhood, this book has had a certain success by the debates it has aroused in women's magazines, family magazines, etc. She won the Victor-Rossel Prize in 1967 for her second novel, L'Odeur du père, an excerpt of which was published in Les Temps Modernes by Simone de Beauvoir, with whom she maintained an ongoing correspondence. A portrait without concession but without resentment of a father lost in appearances. In the story Célébration des grands-mères, published in 1969, she retraces her childhood tossed around between her paternal (petty aristocracy in Ghent) and maternal (upper bourgeoisie of Liège) families who took charge of her alternately with her younger brother and sister. Her pen name as a writer is also inspired by the name of one of her grandmothers.

Called on to sit in 1966 on the National Council of Women of Belgium (an organization that federated Belgian feminist organizations since 1905), she naturally took an interest in the problems experienced by women (this was notably the year of the Women's Strike of FN Herstal), including more specifically widows.

She was on the editorial board of the quarterly literary collection Audace. Becoming a journalist, she shared with Françoise Collin the responsibility of the cultural pages of the weekly La Relève (1965-1970), where they created in 1970 a "Women" section. They notably evoke the recent books of Germaine Greer and Betty Friedan, etc., thus confronting an essentially male editorial board. From this period dates their friendship and their common commitment to feminism. Marie Denis also produces articles for La Revue Nouvelle, Le Ligueur (newspaper of the Ligue des Familles in Belgium), etc.

She played an active role in what has been called the second wave of feminism in Belgium. In 1972, she created Le Petit Livre Rouge des Femmes with Jeanne Vercheval and Suzanne Van Rokeghem. She was one of the founders of the Maison des Femmes in Brussels and one of the initiators of the Women's Days (organized in Brussels, on November 11, 1972 and the following years). Co-founder of the magazine Voyelles, she was part of the editorial board of Cahiers du Grif. Until the 2000s, she was also a member of the redaction committee of La Revue nouvelle.

After ten years of intense activism, Marie Denis published Dis Marie, c'était comment rue du Méridien 79? in 1980 and Retour des choses in 1985, then Le Féminisme est dans la rue with Suzanne Van Rokeghem in 1992. She has also given numerous conferences in Belgium, Quebec, etc. She has worked on Simone de Beauvoir, Suzanne Lilar and Luce Irigaray.

In 1995, several of her articles from La Revue Nouvelle were included in a collection, La Rose des Vents, the title of the section where they had appeared. The choice is made by her of her articles more literary than militant, devoted to life as it comes.

In 1998, she received the Félix Denayer prize for her body of work and the Scriptores Christiani prize for Célébration des grands-mères, published in 1969 and reissued in 1997.

Her granddaughters Catherine and Éléonore Meeùs wrote with Stéphanie Van Vyve a play, Des jours trop longs, inspired by the eponymous novel and created, in a staging by Cécile Van Snick, by Éléonore Meeùs and Stéphanie Van Vyve at the Festival de Spa on August 10, 2012.

== Publications ==
- Connaître la vie: Choice of French texts with commentary for the use of students in the lower grades of secondary education [under the name of Éliane Meeùs], anthology, University Publishing, Brussels, 1960, 222 p. Illustrations by Xavier de Callataÿ.
- Des jours trop longs, novel, Éditions universitaires, Paris, 1961, 167 p.
- L'Odeur du père, novel, Victor-Rossel Prize 1967; first ed. Robert Morel, Forcalquier, 1972, 130 p .; new edition Uccle, Belgium, Éditions Névrosée, 2019, 110 p. (ISBN 978-2-931048-20-7)
- Célébration des grands-mères, Robert Morel, Forcalquier, 1969; reed. Mols, Grâce-Hollogne, 1997 (revised edition), 107 p., (ISBN 2-87402-001-X); reed. (in large print) Blue ink, Villegly, 1998, 140 p., (ISBN 2-84379-038-7).
- Flandres, coll. “La Cuisine rustique”, Robert Morel, Forcalquier, 1970, 183 p.
- Le Petit Livre Rouge des Femmes (with other authors), Éditions Vie Ouvrière, Brussels, 1972, 52 p. Online: Le Petit Livre rouge des Femmes.
- Dis Marie, c’était comment rue du Méridien 79?, Éditions Voyelles - L’une et l’autre (asbl), Brussels, 1980, 205 p.
- Retour des choses (Reine au jardin followed by L'Odeur du père), Éditions Tierce, Paris, 1985, 101 p., (ISBN 2-903144-31-1).
- Le féminisme est dans la rue: Belgique 1970-1975 (with Suzanne Van Rokeghem), POL-HIS, De Boeck, Brussels, 1992, 236 p., (ISBN 2-87311-009-0)
- La Rose des vents, Quorum, Ottignies-Louvain-la-Neuve, 1995, 191 p., (ISBN 2-930014-47-4).

Marie Denis's archives are deposited at the nl: Artprice.com- en Onderzoekscentrum voor Vrouwengeschiedenis (Archives and Research Center for the History of Women, AVG-Carhif).

== Sources ==
- Sophie Kotányi, Dis-moi Marie, production Marisa Films and C.B.A., Brussels, 1985, 29 minutes, color.
- Laure de Hesselle, “Marie Denis: on the adventure of Belgian feminism, its achievements and the battles that still need to be waged”, Le Soir, March 13, 1999.
- Joëlle Kwaschin, Obituary in La Revue nouvelle, 2006.
- Suzanne Van Rokeghem, Jeanne Vercheval-Vervoort & Jacqueline Aubenas, Des femmes dans l’histoire en Belgique, depuis 1830, Éditions Luc Pire, Brussels, 2006, (ISBN 978-2-87415-523-9).
- Claudine Marissal and Éliane Gubin, Jeanne Vercheval: Un engagement social et féministe, Institut pour l'égalité des hommes et des femmes, Brussels, 2011.
