= Sharon Harper =

American photographer

Sharon Harper (born in Stamford, Connecticut in 1966) is a contemporary visual artist, based in Cambridge, Massachusetts. Harper is interested in photography as it relates to perceptual experiences between humans and the natural environment. Harper is currently professor of Art, Film, and Visual Studies at Harvard University.

== Work ==
Harper's photographs examine human perception of time through the movements of the sun, moon, and stars, as mediated by a large format camera. Harper is known for her series "Moon Studies and Star Scratches," in which she uses multiple exposures on large format film to overlap weeks or months of nightly images of the moon and stars to create records of perceptual experience over time.

== Museum Collections ==
Harper's photographs are in the permanent collections of major institutions such as the Museum of Modern Art, New York, the Whitney Museum of American Art, New York, the Metropolitan Museum of Art, the Albright-Knox Art Gallery in Buffalo, New York, the Museum of Fine Arts, Houston, Texas, the Santa Barbara Museum of Art, Santa Barbara, California, the Nelson-Atkins Museum in Kansas City, Missouri, the Harvard Art Museums, Cambridge, Massachusetts, the Portland Art Museum, Portland Oregon, and the New York Public Library.

== Exhibitions ==
- 2015: Photography and the Scientific Spirit, John Michael Kohler Arts Center, Sheboygan, Wisconsin
- 2015: VERZWEIGT! - Trees in Contemporary Art, Museum Sinclair-Haus, Bad Homburg, Germany
- 2014: Sharon Harper: From Above and Below, Hermès Foundation Gallery, New York, New York
- 2014: Skyward, Weatherspoon Art Museum, Greensboro, North Carolina
- 2014: Heavenly Bodies, Santa Barbara Museum of Art, Santa Barbara, California
- 2014: Unfolding Images, Contemporary Arts Center, New Orleans, Louisiana
- 2013: Vivian Keulards & Sharon Harper, Colorado Photographic Arts Center
- 2013: Second Nature, Decordova Museum and Sculpture Park, Lincoln, Massachusetts
- 2008: Moon Studies and Star Scratches: Sharon Harper, The Print Center, Philadelphia, Pennsylvania
- 2001: Sharon Harper: Photographs from the Floating World, Whitney Museum of American Art

== Publications ==
From Above and Below, a monograph spanning ten years of her work documenting the night sky, was published by Radius Books in 2013.

== Awards and recognition ==
In 2013, Harper was the recipient of John Simon Guggenheim Memorial Foundation Fellowship in Photography. She received a Meredith S. Moody Residency Fellowship and an Elizabeth Ames Fellowship at Yaddo, and the Sam and Dusty Boynton Fellow at the Vermont Studio Center. She has received numerous other artist-in-residence fellowships including at the Headlands Center for the Arts in Sausalito, California, the MacDowell Colony, and at the Ucross Foundation among others.
