= Ann Zabludoff =

American astronomer and astrophysicist

Ann I. Zabludoff is an American astronomer and astrophysicist whose research has included galaxy clusters and the effects of galactic environments on star formation, and the use of gravitational lenses to study the formation and interaction of the earliest galaxies, including observations with the Magellan Telescopes and Hubble Space Telescope. She is a professor of astronomy, astrophysics, and cosmology at the University of Arizona.

== Education and career ==
Zabludoff is originally from Pennsylvania. She was an undergraduate at the Massachusetts Institute of Technology and earned bachelor's degrees in both mathematics and physics there in 1986 and 1987, before completing a Ph.D. in astronomy at Harvard University in 1993.

After postdoctoral research as a Carnegie Fellow at the Carnegie Observatories in Pasadena, California and as an Edwin P. Hubble Fellow at the University of California, Santa Cruz, she became a faculty member at the University of Arizona in 1999.

== Recognition ==
Zabludoff was named a Guggenheim Fellow in 2013.
