= Bonnie G. Smith =

American historian (born 1940)

- Born: Bonnie Sullivan; June 30, 1940 (age 85); Bridgeport, Connecticut, U.S.
- Occupation: Historian

Bonnie G. Smith (born June 30, 1940) is an American feminist historian, and currently a part of the Board of Governors Distinguished History Professor at Rutgers University, New Brunswick.

== Biography ==
Bonnie G. Smith was born in Bridgeport, Connecticut, in 1940. Smith attended Smith College, where she earned a bachelor's degree in 1962. Later, she earned a Ph.D. from the University of Rochester in 1976. She has since held fellowships from the Guggenheim Foundation, the Shelby Cullom Davis Center for Historical Studies at Princeton University, the American Council of Learned Societies, the National Humanities Center, and the University of Rochester.

Smith designed a project, co-sponsored by the Organization of American Historians, to integrate the study of women into survey courses. She has been on the board of editors of French Historical Studies, a consulting editor to Feminist Studies, and on the board of associate editors for Journal of Women's History.

Her primary focus began with the histories of the French Empire in the post Industrial age. Since then, Smith's research interests have concerned issues of Cultural Hybridity in the Modern West, Gendering Disability, Women's and Gender History in Global Perspective, Europe in the Twentieth Century World, and Women in World History. Smith's work, The Gender of History, critiques sexism ingrained within the field of historiography, which she argues minimizes the contributions of female historians.

Bonnie Smith is also married to Donald R. Kelley, having three kids. Kelley is an American historian with a focus on European intellectual history.

Smith was also the script writer for the Crash Course European History YouTube series, hosted by John Green.

== Selected works ==
- The Making of the West Concise, co-author with Lynn Hunt, Thomas Martin, and Barbara Rosenwein, 4th edition (Bedford St. Martin’s 2013)
- Women’s Studies: The Basics (Routledge, 2013)
- The Gender of History: Men, Women, and Historical Practice, Chinese edition, 2012
- The Making of the West: Peoples and Cultures, co-author with Lynn Hunt, Thomas Martin, and Barbara Rosenwein, 4th edition (Bedford St. Martin’s 2012)
- Sources of Crossroads and Cultures with Marc Van de Mieroop, Richard von Glahn, and Kris Lane (Bedford St. Martins, 2012)
- Crossroads and Cultures: A History of the World’s Peoples, co-author with Marc Van de Mieroop, Richard von Glahn, and Kris Lane (Bedford St. Martins, 2012)
- Women and Gender in Postwar Europe, co-editor with Joanna Regulska (Routledge 2012)
- Decentered Identities: The Case of the Romantics, History, and Theory, May 2011
- "Women in World History: An Overview", for Clio. Femmes, genre, histoire, twenty-fifth anniversary edition, January 2011
- Europe in the Contemporary World, 1900 to the Present, 2nd edition (Bloomsbury Academic, 2022)
