= Jeanne Vercheval =

Belgian social activist and feminist (born 1939)

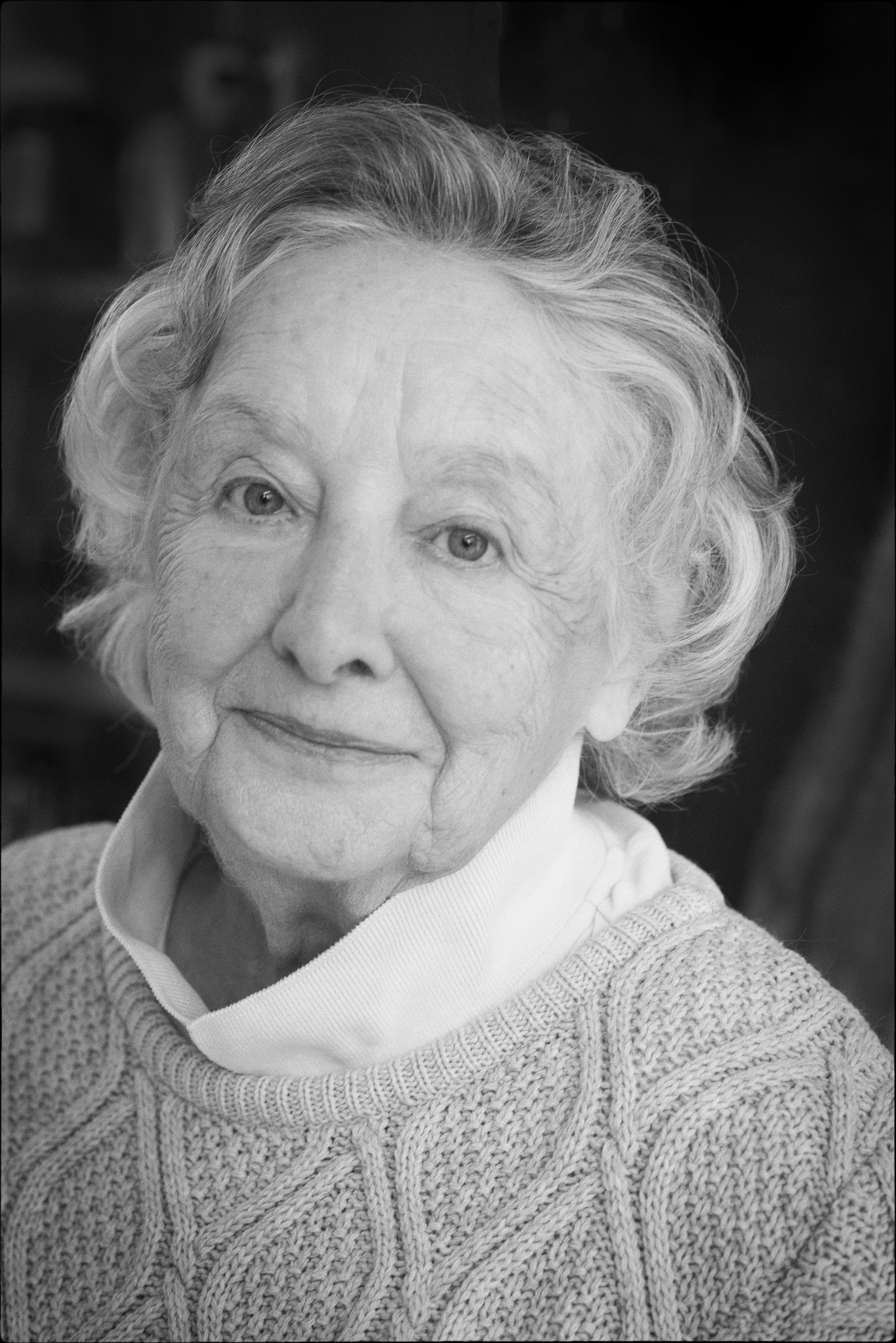
- Jeanne Vercheval, 20 February 2021
- Born: 16 March 1939 (age 87); Charleroi
- Occupations: Women's rights activist; Social activist; Labor activist
- Awards: Walloon Merit, Commander, 2023

Jeanne Vercheval-Vervoort (born 19 March 1939) is a Belgian social activist and feminist. She advocates for women's rights, workers' rights, and feminism.

== Biography ==
Jeanne Vercheval was born in Charleroi on March 16, 1939. She was active within communist and pacifist organizations before committing to the new feminism. She co-founded the Marie Mineur, which supports strikes by women workers demanding better working conditions, campaigns for the decriminalization of abortion and participates with Marie Denis and Suzanne Van Rokeghem in the drafting of the Little Red Book of Women.

Towards the end of the 1970s, she cooperated with the women's magazine Voyelles (1979-1982) which combined informative articles and lighter sections. In 2006, Jeanne Vercheval was the author, with Jacqueline Aubenas and Suzanne Van Rokeghem, of Des Femmes dans l'Histoire, in Belgium since 1830.
