= Clio (journal) =

- Discipline: Feminist history
- Language: French
- Edited by: Rebecca Rogers; Sylvie Steinberg

Publication details
- History: 1995–present
- Publisher: Belin éditeur (France)
- Frequency: Biannual
- Open access: Delayed, after 3 years

Standard abbreviations
- ISO 4: Clio

Indexing
- ISSN: 1252-7017 (print); 2554-3822 (web)
- LCCN: 99100887
- JSTOR: 12527017
- OCLC no.: 937998743

Links
- Journal homepage

Clio. Femmes, genre, histoire (formerly Clio. Histoire, Femmes et Sociétés) is a French biannual peer-reviewed academic journal, specialized in women's social history and gender history, covering all periods. It is published by Belin éditeur and the editors-in-chief are Rebecca Rogers and Sylvie Steinberg.

Originally published by the Presses University of Toulouse-Jean Jaurès, in Toulouse, with the support of the French National Centre for Scientific Research and the Centre national du livre, this French-language journal offers a gendered analysis of society. Except for the last six issues, the others are fully available on the journal's website (hosted by OpenEdition Journals, in open access. The most recent issues are available for a fee per article on Cairn.info. The journal was established in 1945 as "Clio. Histoire, Femmes et Sociétés", obtaining its current name in 2013. Also since that year, the journal added an online English-language version - Clio, Women, Gender, History.

In Greek mythology, Clio (traditionally /ˈklaɪoʊ/, but now more frequently /ˈkliːoʊ/; Greek: Κλειώ), also spelled Kleio, is usually the muse of history, although in a few mythological accounts she is the muse of lyre playing.

== Abstracting and indexing ==
The journal is abstracted and indexed in:

- EBSCO databases
- Index Islamicus
- Modern Language Association Database
- Scopus
