= RapidSMS =

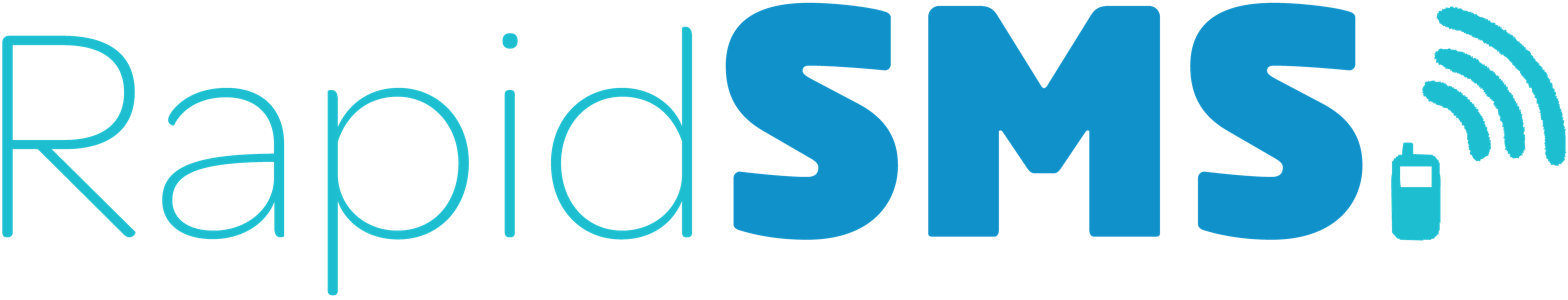
- Original author: UNICEF
- Developers: UNICEF, ThoughtWorks, Dimagi, Millennium Villages Project, Caktus Consulting Group, Timba Objects
- Stable release: 2.2.0 / 5 November 2024; 2 years ago
- Written in: Python
- Operating system: Windows, macOS, Linux
- Type: SMS
- License: BSD
- Website: rapidsms.org
- Repository: github.com/rapidsms/rapidsms

RapidSMS is a web framework based on the Django web framework which extends the logic and capabilities of Django to communicate with SMS messages. Initial development was done by UNICEF's Innovation Unit for use in mobile data collection and polls. A side effect of the work was pygsm, a Python library for interacting with GSM modems, including cell phones which handle the Hayes command set. The software has been deployed in numerous countries, including Senegal, Mauritania, Uganda, Somalia, Zambia, Kenya, Nigeria, Malawi, and Ethiopia.

== Awards ==
- Columbia University and UNICEF won the 2008 USAID Development 2.0 Challenge for their work with RapidSMS in Malawi.
- In 2009, UNICEF won the Gov2.0 Summit Award in the 'Government as a Provider' category for their work with RapidSMS in Malawi.
- Frog Design won two IDSA IDEA Awards (Gold in the Social Impact Design category and Silver in the Design Strategy category) at the 2012 International Design Excellence Awards for their work with UNICEF on Project Mwana.
- In 2010, Matt Berg was chosen by Time Magazine as one of the 100 most influential people of the year for his work with RapidSMS and ChildCount.
- In 2013, Christopher Fabian and Erica Kochi were selected by Time Magazine to be on the Time 100 list of the 100 most influential people in the world for their work with RapidSMS at UNICEF.

== Projects ==
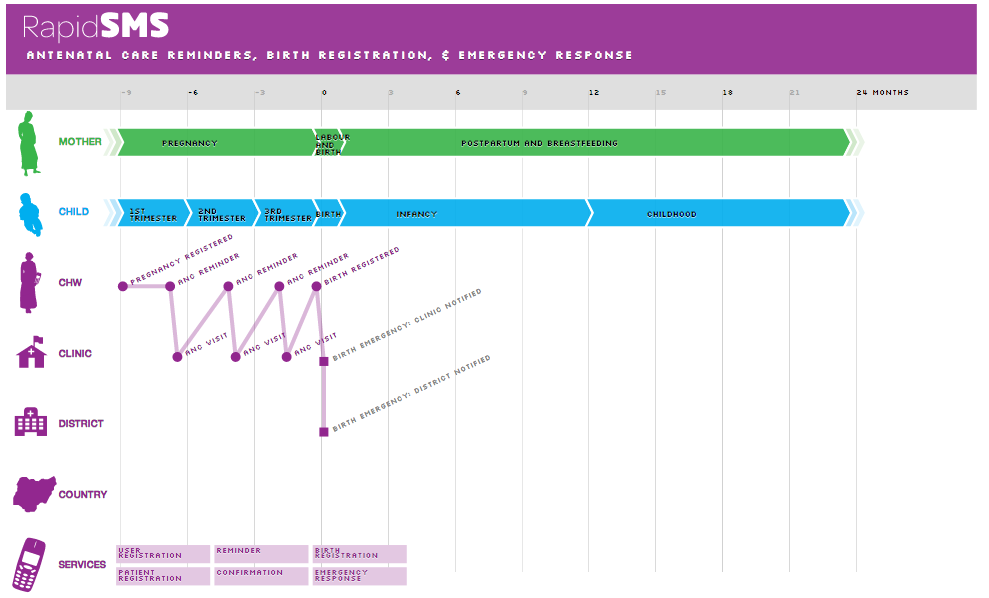
diagram illustrating use of RapidSMS for antenatal care reminders, birth registration, and emergency response

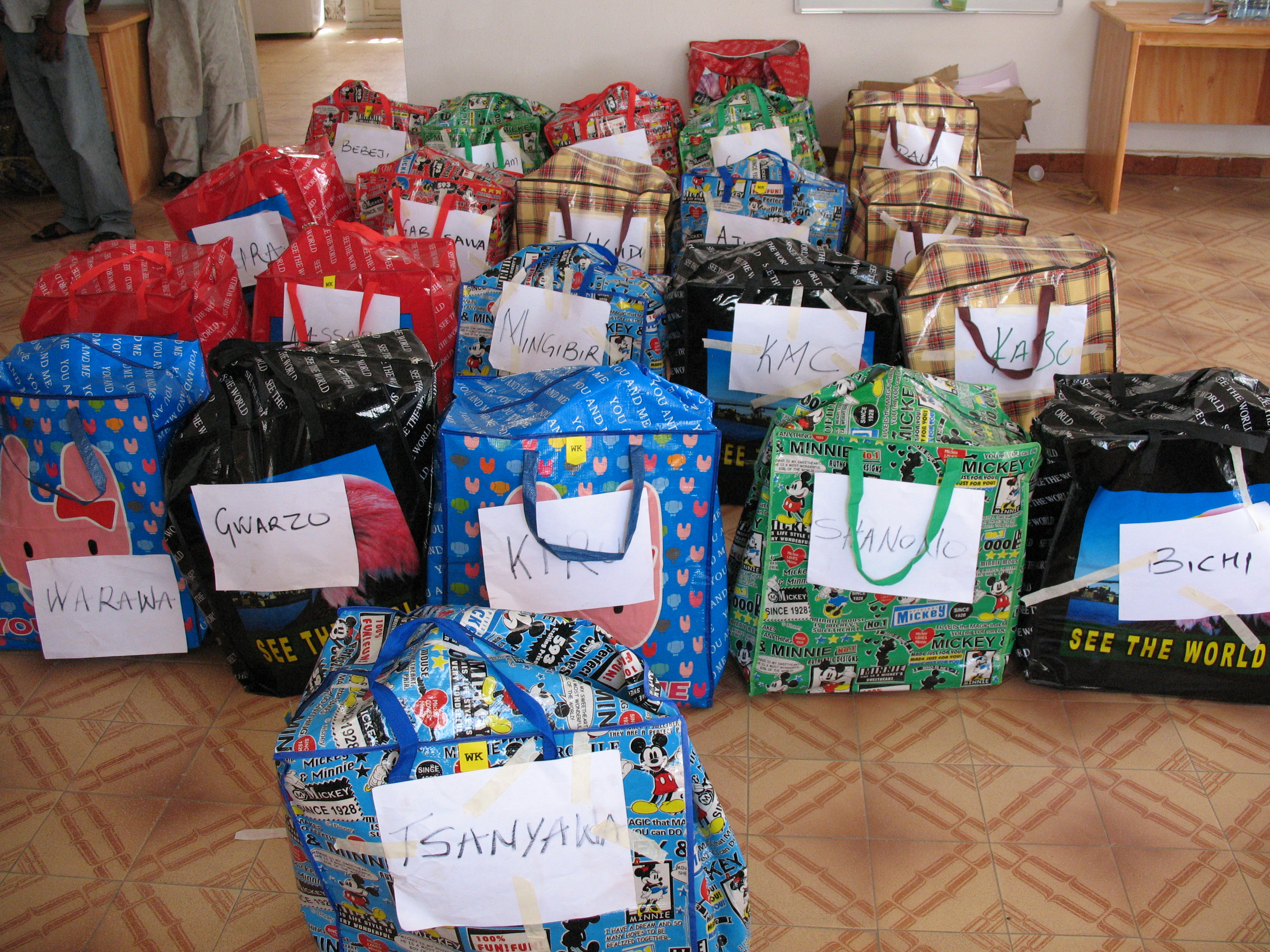
Bags full of paper forms replaced by a RapidSMS data collection system

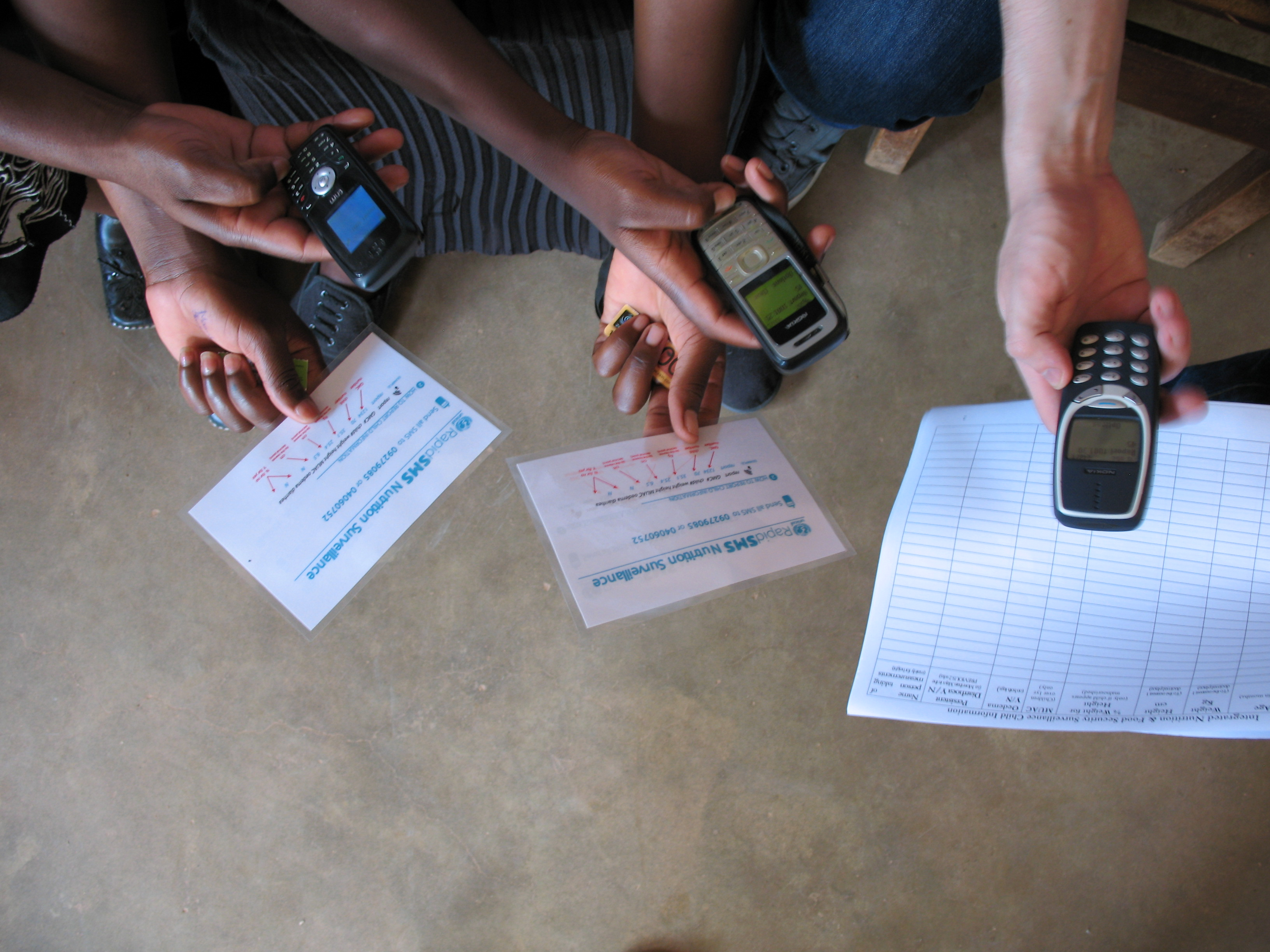
Users with training materials learning how to enter data via SMS instead of paper form

RapidSMS is the basis for a few notable projects:

- mTrac, a disease surveillance and drug tracking system developed by UNICEF and the World Health Organization in Uganda, is one of only a handful of mHealth projects being scaled up nationally. In August 2012, it was featured in "The Wireless Issue" of Time Magazine.
- U-Report, one of the largest SMS social networks of community crowd sourced volunteer reporters in the world, with approximately 200,000 registered users in Uganda as of April 2013, reporting on development issues and engaging directly with national and local government through the platform.
- Birth Registration, UNICEF and Timba Objects developed a system with RapidSMS that is used for birth registration nationwide in Nigeria.
- Project Mwana uses RapidSMS to improve early infant diagnosis of HIV and post-natal follow-up and care. Project Mwana was developed by UNICEF and Frog Design and has been deployed in Zambia and Malawi. Project Mwana won two IDSA IDEA Awards (Gold in the Social Impact Design category and Silver in the Design Strategy category) at the 2012 International Design Excellence Awards.
- RapidSMS MCH, is a system for monitoring pregnancy and reducing bottlenecks in communication associated with maternal and newborn deaths in Rwanda. The project was developed by UNICEF and Pivot Access.
- ChildCount, developed by the Millennium Villages Project and deployed in Kenya. Matt Berg has been chosen by Time Magazine as one of the 100 most influential people of the year for his work with RapidSMS and ChildCount.
- RapidAndroid, developed by UNICEF and Dimagi, is a port of RapidSMS to the Android operating system

- Jokko, was developed by UNICEF, Dimagi, and Tostan to help teach literacy in West Africa.
- Textonic, developed by students in Clay Shirky's 2009 Design For UNICEF course at New York University's Interactive Telecommunications Program to extend RapidSMS to Amazon.com's Amazon Mechanical Turk service.
