= Kawachi =

Kawachi (河内 or 川内) may refer to:

== Places ==
- Kawachi Province, one of the old provinces of Japan
- Kawachi, Kumamoto, a former town in Kumamoto Prefecture
- Kawachi, Osaka, a former city in Osaka Prefecture
- Kawachi, Ibaraki, a town in Ibaraki Prefecture
- Kawachi, Ishikawa, a former village in Ishikawa Prefecture
- Kawachi, Tochigi, a former town in Tochigi Prefecture
- Kawachinagano, a city in Osaka Prefecture

== Other uses ==
- Kawachi (surname), a Japanese surname
- Kawachi ondo, a genre of Japanese music
- Kawachi-class battleship, a two-ship class of dreadnought battleships built for the Imperial Japanese Navy
- Japanese battleship Kawachi, lead ship of her class battleship during World War I
- Kawachi Bankan, a pomelo-like citrus hybrid

== See also ==
- Cahuachi, major ceremonial center of the Nazca culture in present-day Peru
- Kawauchi (disambiguation)
- Kochi (disambiguation)
- 河内 (disambiguation)
