= 河内 =

河内 or 河內 may refer to:

== People ==
- Katsuyuki Kawachi (河内 勝幸) (born 1955), Japanese footballer

== Places ==
- Kawachi Province, an old province of Japan
- Kawachi District, Tochigi, a district in Tochigi Prefecture, Japan
- Minamikawachi District, Osaka, a district in Osaka Prefecture, Japan
- Henei Commandery, a commandery of China from Han dynasty

=== City ===
- Hanoi, the capital city of Vietnam
- Kawachi, Osaka, a former city in Osaka Prefecture, Japan
- Kawachinagano, Osaka, a city in Osaka Prefecture, Japan

=== Town ===
- Kawachi, Ibaraki, a town in Ibaraki Prefecture, Japan
- Kawachi, Tochigi, a former town in Tochigi Prefecture, Japan
- Kōchi, Hiroshima, a former town in Hiroshima Prefecture, Japan

=== Village ===
- Kawachi, Ishikawa, a former village in Ishikawa Prefecture, Japan

== Literature ==
- Hanoi (novel), a Killmaster spy novel

== Music ==
- Hanoï (album), an Indochine album
- Kawachi ondo, a genre of Japanese music

== Ship ==
- Japanese battleship Kawachi, lead ship of her class battleship during World War I
  - Kawachi-class battleship, a two-ship class of dreadnought battleships built for the Imperial Japanese Navy

== Station ==
- Kōchi Station (Hiroshima), a train station in Higashihiroshima, Hiroshima Prefecture, Japan

== See also ==
- Kawachi (disambiguation)
- Kawauchi (disambiguation)
- Kochi (disambiguation)
- Kōchi Station (disambiguation)
