= Cochin (disambiguation) =

Cochin is the former name of Kochi, a port city in India.

Cochin may also refer to:

== Geography ==
- Kingdom of Cochin, a former feudal city-state on Malabar Coast, India
- Travancore–Cochin, Indian state from 1949 to 1956
- Cochinchina, former name used by Europeans for Vietnam, especially its Southern part
- Cochin, Saskatchewan, Canada, a Resort Village in Saskatchewan, Canada

== People with the surname ==
- Charles-Nicolas Cochin the Elder (1688–1754), French engraver
- Charles Nicolas Cochin (1715–1790), French engraver, designer, writer, and painter; son of the prior
- Pierre-Suzanne-Augustin Cochin (1823–1872), French politician and writer
- Denys Cochin, French politician and writer
- Augustin Cochin (politician) (1823–1872), French politician and writer
- Augustin Cochin (historian) (1876–1916), French historian and grandson of the prior
- Jean-Denis Cochin (1726–1783), French Catholic priest

== Other uses ==
- Cochin (chicken), a breed of chicken known for its thick plumage
- Hôpital Cochin, a famous hospital in Paris, France
- Cochin (typeface), a typeface designed in 1912
- Cochin ware, a type of Chinese pottery
- Cochin Jews, Indian Jews from Cochin

== See also ==
- Kochi (disambiguation)
