= Chiyu =

Chiyu may refer to:

== Place ==
- Chiyu Banking Corporation, a bank incorporated in Hong Kong
- Chiyu River, a river in Guatemala

== People ==
- Chiyu, the bassist of Sug
- Chiyu Uemae (上前智祐; 1920–2018), Japanese painter who was a founding member of Gutai Art Association
- Zhang Chiyu (张吃鱼; born 1986) Chinese film director, screenwriter and producer

== Fictional characters ==
- Chiyu, a character from the OVA Netrun-mon
- Chiyu (チユ), a character from the anime series Lord of Vermilion: The Crimson King
- Chiyu Haebaru (南風原知夢), a character from the anime series The Aquatope on White Sand
- Chiyu Sawaizumi (沢泉ちゆ), a character from the anime series Healin' Good Pretty Cure
- Chiyu Tamade (珠手ちゆ), a character from the media franchise BanG Dream!
- Chi-Yu, a fiery, fish-like Pokémon from Pokémon Scarlet and Violet.

== See also ==
- Chiyou, a Chinese mythological being
- Chiyo, a feminine Japanese name
