= Chiyo =

Chiyo is a feminine Japanese given name. Notable people with the name include:

- Chiyo Aizawa, Japanese woman convicted of the murder of her father, who had sexually abused her since childhood
- Kaga no Chiyo (加賀 千代; 1703-1775), Japanese poet of the Edo period and a Buddhist nun
- Chiyo Kimura (木村 チヨ; 1890–1956), Japanese politician
- Chiyo Maeda (前田 千世; 1580–1641), Japanese noble woman from the Sengoku period
- Chiyo Mikami (三上 千代; 1891–1978), Japanese nurse
- Chiyo Miyako, Japanese supercentenarian
- Mochizuki Chiyo, Japanese kunoichi from the Sengoku period
- Chiyo Nakamura (中村 チヨ; 1906–1969), Japanese Nivkh shaman and folklore author
- Chiyo Okumura (奥村 チヨ; born 1947), Japanese pop singer and former fashion model
- Chiyo Ousaki (桜咲 千依; born 1988), Japanese voice actress, singer, and DJ
- Chiyo Sakakibara (榊原 千代; 1898–1987), Japanese journalist, educator and politician
- Chiyo Tsutsumi (堤 千代; 1917–1955), Japanese short story writer
- Chiyo Uno (宇野 千代; 1897–1996), Japanese author and kimono designer
- Chiyo Yamauchi (山内 千代; 1557–1617), Japanese noble lady from the Sengoku period

== Fictional characters ==
- Chiyo, from the anime and manga series Naruto
- Chiyo Mihama, from the anime and manga series Azumanga Daioh
- Chiyo Shuuzenji, from Boku no Hero Academia
- Chiyo Sakura, from the anime and manga series Monthly Girls' Nozaki-kun
- Chiyo Tsukidate, a character from the Strawberry Panic! anime series
- Sakamoto Chiyo/Nitta Sayuri, from Memoirs of a Geisha
- Chiyo Yumehara, from the anime and manga series The Disastrous Life of Saiki K.
- Chiyo Īn from the manga Kimi no koto ga Dai Dai Dai Dai Daisuki na 100-nin no Kanojo
- Chiyo Suzuki, from the multimedia franchise Yo-Kai Watch

== See also ==
- Kawauchi (disambiguation)
- Sendai (disambiguation)
