= CUSAT (disambiguation) =

Cochin University of Science and Technology is a university in Cochin (Kochi), Kerala, India.

CUSAT may also refer to:

- CUSAT metro station, a Kochi Metro station near the university
- Cornell University Satellite, a satellite project team from Cornell University

== See also ==
- Kochi University (disambiguation)
- True quantified Boolean formula, also known as QSAT
- Kusat, a village in Oman
