= Kochi University (disambiguation) =

Kochi University usually refers to Kōchi University in Kōchi, Kōchi Prefecture, Japan.

It may also refer to:

- University of Kochi, Kōchi, Kōchi Prefecture, Japan
- Kochi Gakuen College, a private junior college in Kōchi, Kōchi Prefecture, Japan
- Kochi Women's University, a public university for women in Kōchi, Kōchi Prefecture, Japan
- Kochi University of Technology, a private university in Kami, Kōchi Prefecture, Japan

== See also ==
- CUSAT (disambiguation)
- Cochin University of Science and Technology, university in Kochi (Cochin), Kerala, India
  - Cochin University metro station, Kochi Metro station near the university
