= Augustin Cochin =

Augustin Cochin may refer to:

- Augustin Cochin (politician) (1823–1872), French politician and writer
- Augustin Cochin (historian) (1876–1916), French historian and grandson of the prior
