= Christopher Fabian =

Polish-American technologist

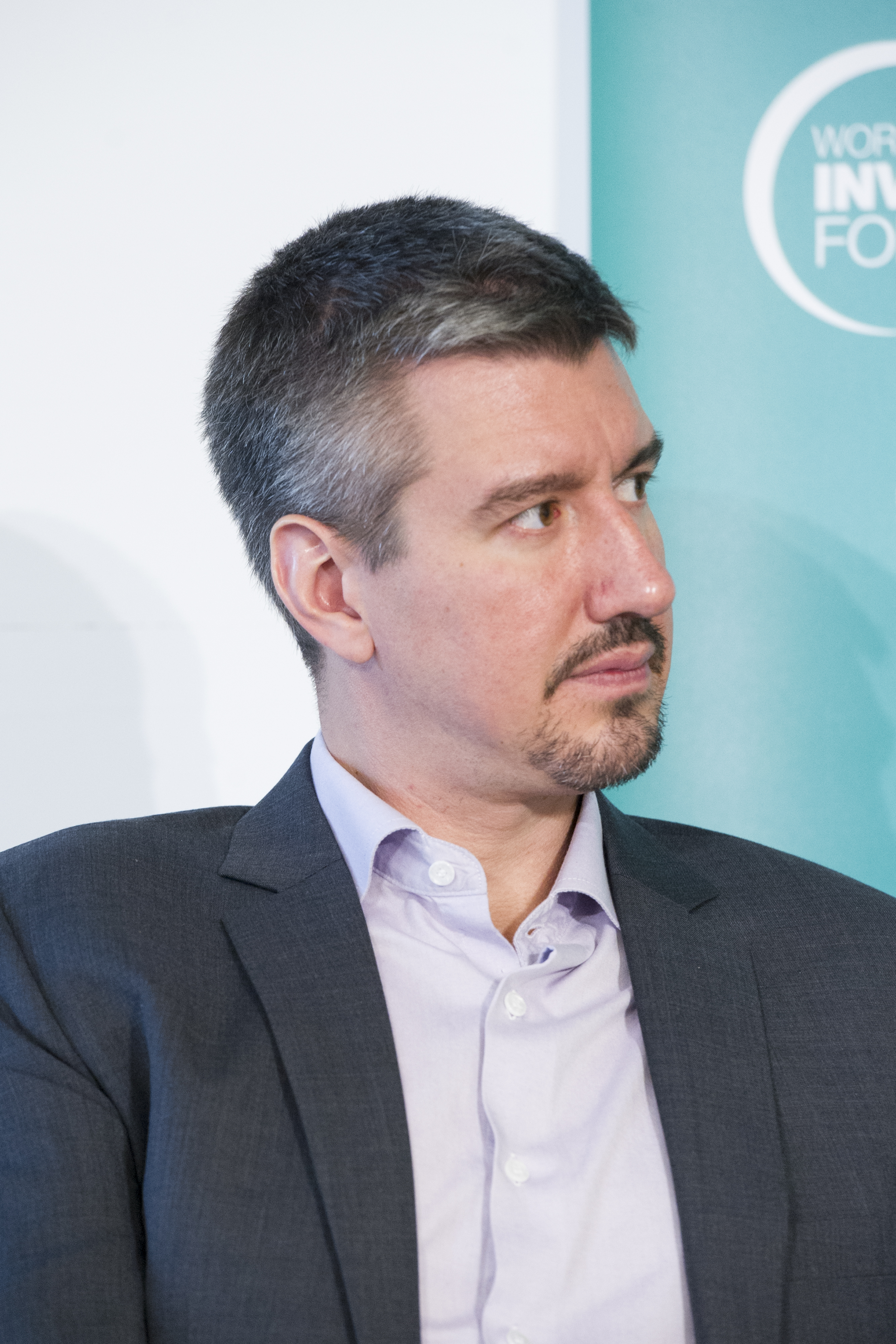
- Chris Fabian at the World Investment Forum 2018
- Born: 1980 (age 45–46); New York, New York
- Occupations: Technology designer, lecturer, investor
- Known for: GIGA, RapidSMS, UNICEF Innovation Fund, U-Report, RapidPro, EduTrac, Technology in Emergencies

Christopher Fabian (born April 18, 1980) is a technologist who works for UNICEF. He founded technology and finance initiatives in both the public and private sector, including the creation in 2006, of UNICEF's Innovation Unit.

Fabian is an advocate of exploring new technology, and taking a "venture-style" approach to investments in the public sector. In this vein, he took part in the launch of the UNICEF’s Innovation Fund, the United Nations Innovation Network at the UN Chief Executives' Board, UNICEF's Cryptocurrency Fund, and the Digital Public Goods Alliance.

Fabian regularly holds talks and lectures on the impact of technology on sustainable development.

== Personal life and early work ==
Fabian studied philosophy at the American University in Cairo and at Trinity College in Dublin. He also holds a degree in Media Studies from the New School in New York, NY.

Before joining UNICEF, Fabian taught in Lebanon and founded companies in Africa and the Middle East, including a web portal in Tanzania.

== Work at UNICEF ==
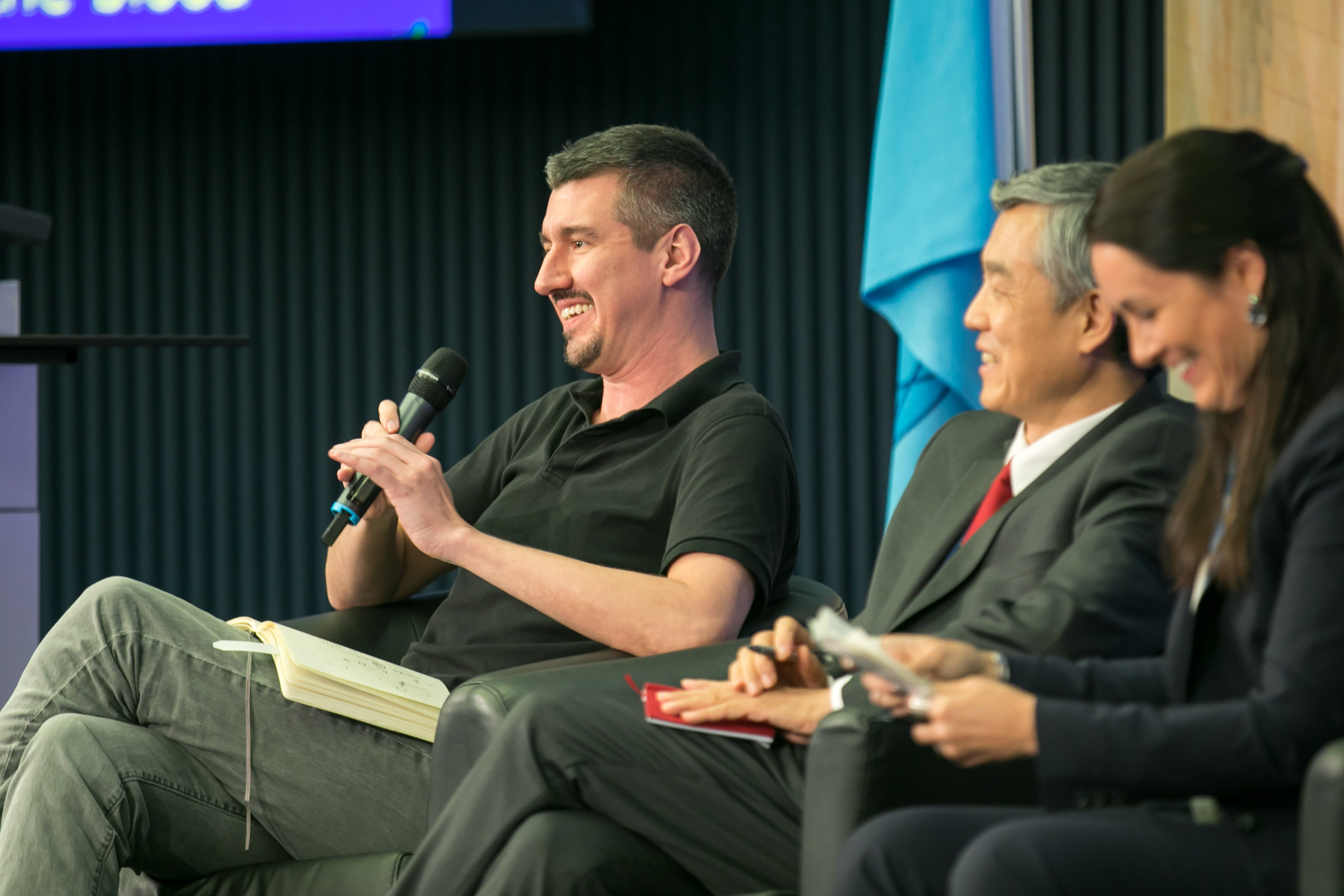
Chris Fabian speaks about connectivity and data fairness and equity at the ITU's AI summit in Geneva.

He co-founded UNICEF's Office of Innovation in 2006, which focuses on connecting those with good ideas to those with the means to take them to scale. From 2007-2017, Fabian has been Senior Advisor on Innovation to the Executive Director at UNICEF.

In its early days, the Office of Innovation developed open source tools for improving basic health and communication in low-infrastructure regions. It helped build the largest mobile health system in the world in Nigeria, which reported on more than 17M births by SMS. Other tools include U-Report, which enables over 3 million young people in 34 developing and developed countries to be connected to decision makers via SMS, and globally via Twitter. The Office of Innovation has also used real-time SMS to help stop the spread of Ebola, smartphones to register children after a disaster, and tablet-based games to teach kids in Sudan.

Fabian has advocated for technologists in the development space to incorporate The Principles for Digital Development (first created by UNICEF and USAID). These Principles, such as be open source, build with local technologists, and build for sustainability, are used widely in the international development community.

In 2011, Fabian advised on the creation of a framework of innovations labs linking WHO, UNDP, UNICEF as well as public and private-sector partners around in-country innovation. In 2013, Fabian helped launch the Child Friendly Technology Framework (CFT), 52 worksheets used for brainstorming and project planning when an idea for a project with a technology component is focused on children and adolescents. In 2015, Fabian designed the first Global Innovation Summit for Children, co-organised by UNICEF and the Ministry Foreign Affairs of Finland.

=== UNICEF Innovation Fund ===
In 2015 he led the launch of UNICEF’s Innovation Fund, a pooled funding vehicle built to quickly assess, fund and scale companies, teams, and ideas that have been developed in new and emerging markets.

In 2016, it added a UNICEF Ventures fund for small, early-stage investments. in 2016, Fabian has worked to build platforms that can allow for rapid development, testing, and deployment of new technologies and approaches to solving problems. Ventures work has included investment in “frontier technology” such as Drones, UAVs, data science and machine learning. Examples include the UNICEF Drone Corridor in Malawi, in 2016, and the "Magic Box" platform for working with large realtime datasets. The Magic Box platform allows companies like IBM, Google, and Telefonica to pool data so it can be used to make realtime decisions in emergencies.

As of 2020, the Innovation Fund held USD $20 million and has made over 60 investments in open source technology companies in 40 countries.

=== Other ventures ===
In 2018, with Robert Opp of WFP, he created the United Nations Innovation Network at the UN Chief Executives' Board. This informal network spanned 1400 staff from all UN agencies and was 'decentralized' in its governance.

In 2019, Fabian led UNICEF's launch of the first Cryptocurrency Fund in the United Nations. This Fund takes Ethereum or Bitcoin, holds it in its native form, and allows UNICEF to disperse it, as cryptocurrency, to open-source technology startups. The same year, Fabian also launched GIGA with Doreen Bogdan-Martin of ITU to finance connectivity for every school in the world. He and Sunita Grote were selected as one of WIRED Magazine's "WIRED25" for their work on building realtime maps of school connectivity, and creating financing partnerships based on aggregated connectivity demand.

In 2019, he also led the development of the Digital Public Goods Alliance - a platform built with the Government of Norway, Sierra Leone's DSTI (Department of Science, Technology, and Innovation) run by Minister David Sengeh, and India's iSpirit to identify and support open source software for public good.

== Lectures and philosophy ==
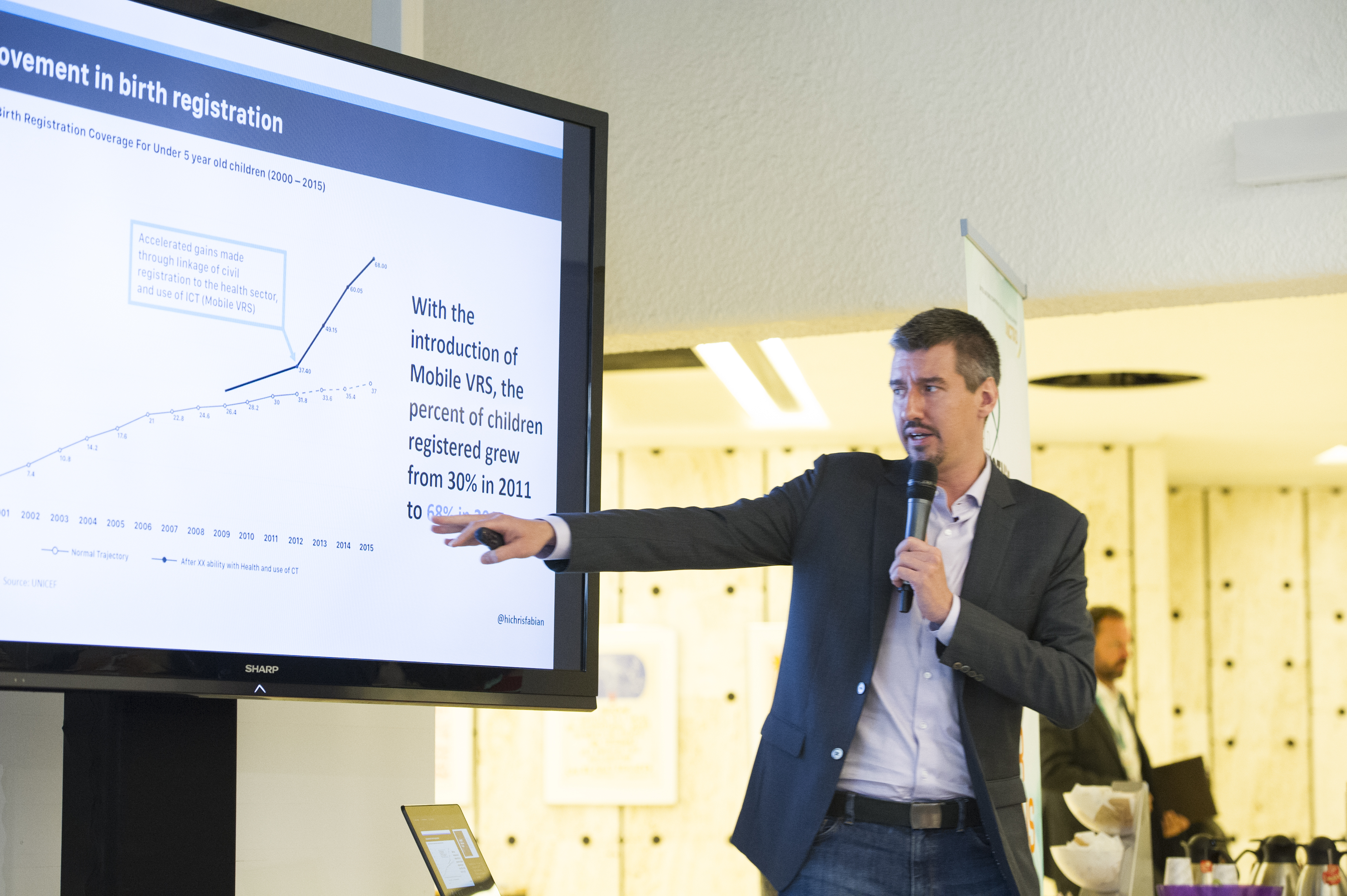
Chris Fabian holds a lecture during the World Investment Forum 2018

Fabian believes that major global trends in technology and evolving power structures systematically and consistently affect poor people more negatively than wealthy ones and speaks about how public sector money and investing should be used to create public value and public capital, rather than simply continue and extend systems of inequality.

Fabian has said that he believes technology is not the end-product of innovation, but a driver of new ways of thinking about development problems. He talks about open-source projects, learning from failure, and having solutions designed and built by local talent.

He has lectured about South-to-North and South-to-South innovation, and developed a "Design for UNICEF" course which he taught at New York University (co-taught with Clay Shirky) and Columbia University. He has also taught or lectured at the Art Center, Aalto University, Harvard University, IIT Delhi, Singularity University, and Tsinghua University.

== Film ==
Fabian was also an Executive Producer of the virtual-reality film Clouds Over Sidra, created by Vrse.works. The film follows Sidra, a 12-year-old girl that has fled her home in Syria due to the ongoing crisis and found herself in Jordan’s Zaatari refugee camp.

== Awards and Affiliations ==
- Board Member, International Advisory Board, European Parliament Science and Technology Options Assessment Centre for AI
- Commissioner, Governing Health Futures a The Lancet and FT Commission
- Novus Summit award, for work toward achieving the Sustainable Development Goals (SDGs). (2016)
- Fast Company's "Most Innovative Companies in the World in Local": recognizing UNICEF for RapidSMS. (2014)
- Time 100 Most Influential People (2013, with Erica Kochi)
- Disruptor Foundation Fellow (2013)
- Industrial Designers Society of America: Gold & Silver Awards for improving the lives of the underserved, & integrating real-time data. (2012)
- "RedHat prize", for being one of four top open source projects. (2012)
- Gov 2.0 Summit Award, for RapidSMS (2009)

== Publications ==
- "Un-chained: Experiments and Learnings in Crypto at UNICEF"
- "Innovation for International Development: Navigating the Paths and Pitfalls", on "The Balancing Act of an Innovation Unit." (2016)
- "How The Tech Sector Can Help Stop Ebola" (2014)
- “The Ethics of Innovation” (2014)
- “Adolescent Girls and Technology, Supporting Participatory Engagement.” Chapter 7 in Adolescent Girls, Cornerstone of Society (2012)
- “Using Mobile Technology to Unite (for) Children.” Chapter in Mobile Technology for Children: Designing for Interaction and Learning. (2009)
