= Kochi (disambiguation) =

Kochi is a city in Kerala, India.

Kochi or Kōchi may also refer to:

== People ==
- Kochi people, a predominantly Pashtun nomadic people of Afghanistan
- Kochi (古知 or 東風), a Japanese surname:
  - Arata Kochi (born 1948 or 1949), Japanese physician and World Health Organization official
  - Jun Kochi (born 1983), Japanese football goalkeeper in the Dhivehi Premier League, Maldives
- Kōchi (髙地, 高知, 高智, or 幸地), a Japanese surname with a different pronunciation:
  - Kōchi Chōjō (1843–1891), aristocrat of the Ryukyu Kingdom
  - Kōchi Ryōtoku (died 1798), bureaucrat of the Ryukyu Kingdom
  - Jay Kochi (1927–2008), American organic chemist of Japanese descent
  - Momoko Kochi (1932–1998), Japanese actress
  - Mizuho Katayama (previously Mizuho Kōchi; born 1969), synchronized swimming coach in Japan
  - Yamato Kochi (born 1978), Japanese actor
  - Erica Kochi (born 1979), UNICEF official
  - Kairi Kochi (born 1985), Japanese handball player
  - Yugo Kochi (born 1994), Japanese singer
- A given name:
  - Kochi Rani Mondal (fl. 2010), Bangladeshi Kabaddi player

== Places ==
- Related to Kochi, Kerala, India:
  - Fort Kochi, one of the three main urban components which constitute the present day city of Kochi
  - Kochi metropolitan area, also known as Kochi Urban Agglomeration or Kochi UA
- Kōchi, Hiroshima, a former town in Hiroshima Prefecture, Japan
- Kōchi (city), the capital city of Kōchi Prefecture, Japan
  - Kōchi Prefecture, a prefecture in Japan
  - Kōchi Ryōma Airport, also known as Kōchi Airport, a regional airport in Nankoku, Kōchi Prefecture, Japan
- Kochi Sub-county of Yumbe District, Uganda
  - River Kochi at Kochi Sub-county of Yumbe, Uganda

== Other ==
- 2396 Kochi, an asteroid discovered in 1981
- Kochi, a name for the Rampuri dialect of Mahasu Pahari
- Kochi font, a font development project by Yasuyuki Furukawa to build free replacements of proprietary fonts
- Kochi reaction, an organic reaction for the decarboxylation of carboxylic acids to alkyl halides
- Kochi (kuih), a Malay-style cake with coconut filling
- Kochi Fighting Dogs, a semi-professional baseball team in the Shikoku Island League of Japan
- Kochi Refineries, a petroleum company in India
- Kochi Tuskers Kerala, a former Indian Premier League T20 cricket team
- Kochi (restaurant), a Michelin-starred restaurant in New York specializing in skewers

== See also ==
- Cochin (disambiguation), former name of the city in India
- Kōchi Station (disambiguation)
- Kochi University (disambiguation)
