= Kawachi (surname) =

Kawachi (written: 川内 or 河内) is a Japanese surname. Notable people with the surname include:

- Ichiro Kawachi, epidemiologist
- Katsuyuki Kawachi (河内 勝幸, born 1955), Japanese footballer
- Masatsugu Kawachi (川内 将嗣, born 1985), Japanese boxer
- Tamio Kawachi (川地 民夫, 1938–2018), Japanese actor

== Fictional characters ==
- Kyoskue Kawachi (東 和馬), a character in Yakitate!! Japan
