= U-Report =

SMS social monitoring tool developed by UNICEF

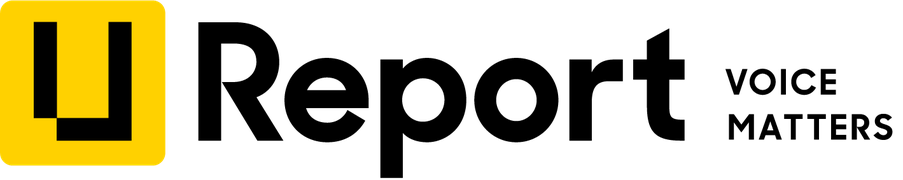
- U Report Global
- Established: May 2011; 14 years ago
- Founded at: Uganda
- Type: Fund
- Purpose: Community-led development
- Location: 99 countries
- Parent organization: UNICEF
- Website: https://ureport.in/

U-Report is a social messaging tool and data collection system developed by UNICEF to improve citizen engagement, inform leaders, and foster positive change. The program sends SMS polls and alerts to its participants, collecting real-time responses, and subsequently publishes gathered data. Issues polled include health, education, gender, climate change, water, sanitation and hygiene, youth unemployment, HIV/AIDS, and disease outbreaks. The program currently has 28 million u-reporters in 95 countries.

== History ==
In 2007, UNICEF Innovation used RapidSMS to develop U-Report, a platform that would allow anyone to publish real-time information and data analytics in SMS format without the need of a programmer. In May 2011, Uganda became the first country in which UNICEF launched the U-Report mobile initiative, due to its population being, on average, one of the youngest in the world. Another reason UNICEF cited for introducing the program in Uganda was the nation's high cellphone use compared to other developing nations, with 48% of the nation's citizens owning a cellphone. Due to U-Report's success in Uganda, UNICEF expanded the program to Zambia in December 2012 and to Nigeria in June 2014. In Zambia, U-report was used to prevent HIV among adolescents and young people, with voluntary HIV testing in the country rising from 24% of the population to 40%. In Nigeria, U-Report primarily conducts surveys on social and medical issues.

In July 2015, U-Report reached a total of one million reporters in fifteen countries. In October 2015, Ukraine became the first country in Europe to join the U-Report program, growing to 68,273 participants by September 30, 2018.

== See also ==
- World Health Report
- Human Development Report
- The State of the World's Children
- World Development Report
