= Awaaz do =

- Awaaz do logo
- Formation: 2000; 26 years ago
- Type: Online campaign
- Legal status: Active
- Parent organization: UNICEF International

Awaaz Do (English translation: Speak up) is an initiative taken by UNICEF to mobilize Indian society to speak up for the more than eight million children currently out of school in the country. Awaaz do is primarily an online campaign with focus on empowering citizens to get actively involved and demand right for children. The idea behind the campaign is to help more than eight million children in the country, who are currently out of school, and to provide them formal education.

Launched in 2010, the campaign has received support from citizens through online social campaign with more than 250 thousand registrations on the official website and from government and corporate organizations with several corporate and media houses partnering with UNICEF for the cause. Priyanka Chopra, UNICEF celebrity ambassador, and Kapil Sibal, Minister of Human Resource Development, have signed up as an Awaaz Do champions to garner support for the campaign.

== History ==
The passing of the Right of Children to Free and Compulsory Education (RTE) Act 2009 has made education a fundamental right of every child between the ages of six and fourteen and specifies minimum norms in elementary schools. Still, an estimated eight million children (6 to 14 years) in India were out-of-school in 2009.

== Launch ==
The campaign is being launched by UNICEF, with the support of the Government of India. "Awaaz Do" means "Speak Up" in Hindi and is symbolized by a megaphone logo. The Awaaz Do on-line campaign was launched on October 19, 2010. At the launch, Urmila Sarkar, UNICEF's Chief of Education said

"UNICEF is working with the Government of India to outline a roadmap for implementing RTE at the national and state level. However, the success of this act is also largely dependent on collective action. The Awaaz Do campaign is a platform for the combined voices of the government, the corporate world, the media and individuals to become an undeniable force to ensure every child is in school."

== Vision ==
The initiative is all about the power of words that can help change the lives of 8 million children who are not in school yet. The online Awaaz Do campaign aims at use of technology and social networking that allows citizens to get actively involved and demand the rights for children who are excluded and marginalized. Unicef India representative, Karin Hulshof said about the vision of Awaaz do campaign

"Awaaz Do is an online campaign to create awareness about the RTE Act. The landmark passing of the Right of Children to Free and Compulsory Education Act 2009, (as the RTE Act is also known as) marks a historic moment for the children of India."

== Support ==
=== Online support ===
Awaaz do is primarily an online campaign with focus on empowering citizens to get actively involved and demand right for children. Karin Hulshof highlighted involvement of citizens through social networking

"By making use of social networking, the campaign aims to empower citizens to get actively involved and demand the right for children, who are excluded and marginalised."

A website was launched on October 19, 2010. The website provides introduction to the campaign, video and other forms of support offered by various groups and individuals, press releases, and registration link. Apart from registering for the program, the campaign lists specific things one can do; such as visiting a school nearby, checking whether the school has basic amenities and spreading the word among teachers and parents about RTE act. By the end of 2012, More than 250 thousand people have joined the campaign through online Awaaz Do website.

=== Government and corporate support ===
Besides Government of India, several corporates, celebrities, social activists, and general public have come forward to support the movement. Priyanka Chopra, an Indian actor, singer, and UNICEF celebrity ambassador, and Kapil Sibal, Minister of Human Resource Development, have signed up as an Awaaz Do champions to garner support. Priyanka Chopra has also recorded several videos highlighting the vision of the campaign and urging people to join the movement.

Several corporate and media houses have partnered with UNICEF to endorse the cause. Tata Teleservices, Barista Lavazza, Park Hotels, Tupperware are urging their customers to speak up. Disney network and Chandamama are asking their viewers and readers – primarily children – to spread awareness on the campaign. Many leading corporates, such as CPA Global, are encouraging their employees to sign up. Radio City and Planet RadioCity.com are connecting with each one of their listeners across its 20 stations to take the online pledge and be part of the change. Photography and short-film contests are also being organized with prizes sponsored by Canon.

== See also ==
- Unicef
- RTE act
