= Sendai (disambiguation) =

Sendai is the capital city of Miyagi Prefecture, Japan.

Sendai may also refer to:

- Sendai River, a river in Miyazaki and Kagoshima Prefectures, Japan
- Sendai River (Tottori), a stream in Tottori Prefecture, Japan
- Sendai Station (Miyagi), railway station in Miyagi, Japan
- Sendai Station (Kagoshima), railway station in Satsumasendai, Kagoshima Prefecture, Japan
- Sendai Domain, former Japanese domain of the Edo period
- Sendai Airport, airport in Sendai
- Sendai Nuclear Power Plant, located near Satsumasendai, Kagoshima Prefecture, Japan
- FM Sendai, the former name of Date FM, a radio station in Miyagi Prefecture, Japan
- Sendai-class cruiser, Japanese cruiser class
- Japanese cruiser Sendai, Japanese cruiser
- Sendai virus, a parainfluenza virus
- 3133 Sendai, asteroid
- Sendai University, a private university
- Sendai Sachiko, Japanese professional wrestler
- Sendai Girls' Pro Wrestling, a Japanese women's professional wrestling league
- Sendai Framework, an international agreement on disaster risk reduction

== People with the given name ==
- Sendai Tanaka (田中 繊大; born 1972), Japanese boxing trainer

== See also ==
- Satsumasendai, Kagoshima, merger of the former city of Sendai, Kagoshima, and other towns in Satsuma District, Japan
- Sendai 仙台, benefit CD for earthquake reconstruction by musicians Jan Linton and Matthew Seligman
- My Stay in Sendai, album by Korean singer Lee Soo Young
- All pages beginning with Sendai
- Chiyo (disambiguation)
- Kawauchi (disambiguation)
