= Kōchi Station =

Kōchi Station is the name of two train stations in Japan:

- Kōchi Station (Hiroshima) (河内駅), a train station in Higashihiroshima, Hiroshima Prefecture
- Kōchi Station (Kōchi) (高知駅), a train station on the Dosan Line of Shikoku Railway Company located in the city center of Kōchi, Kōchi Prefecture

It may also refer to one of the following similarly named stations:

- Kōchi-Ekimae Station (高知駅前駅), a tram station in Kōchi, Kōchi Prefecture located in front of Kōchi Station
- Kōchi-Shōgyō-Mae Station (高知商業前駅), a train station in Kōchi, Kōchi Prefecture

== See also ==
- Kochi (disambiguation)
- 河内 (disambiguation)
