= Erica Kochi =

Humanitarian and technologist

- Born: 18 October 1979 (age 46); Sendai, Japan
- Occupation: Humanitarian
- Known for: UNICEF Innovation, RapidSMS, UReport
- Website: ericakochi.tumblr.com

Erica Kochi (高知エリカ, Kōchi Erika; born 1979, in Sendai, Japan) is a humanitarian and a technologist who worked in UNICEF's Innovation Unit with Christopher Fabian. In 2013, she was chosen by Time magazine as one of the 100 most influential people in the world.

UNICEF Innovation works in the design of development solutions. Examples of this work include the Digital Drum, a computer packaged in an oil drum helping rural communities that have difficulty getting information about health, education and other issues. RapidSMS is a system that uses basic mobile phones and SMS messages to communicate with front-line workers and improve the speed and quality of data collection and health and education services. It won a Gold and Silver IDSA awards, and a Redhat prize for being one of the top four open source projects

Kochi's UNICEF Innovation has worked with partners to develop open source technologies that have registered 7 million births in Nigeria over 15 months and provided antenatal care to thousands of pregnant women across Rwanda. These systems have led to successes such as the tracking of the distribution of more than 25 million insecticide treated mosquito nets and a direct feedback loop from more than 190,000 young Ugandans to engage with their government and change policy in real time.

Before UNICEF, Kochi worked with the Commission for Macroeconomics and Health, a joint collaboration between the World Bank and the World Health Organization.

Kochi co-taught "Design for UNICEF" at New York University's Tisch School of the Arts with Clay Shirky. She has lectured at the Yale School of Management, Harvard University, the Art Center College of Design, Stanford University School of Engineering, and Columbia University's School of International and Public Affairs on technology, innovation, design and international development.

Kochi left unicef in 2020.
