= Matt Berg =

American businessman

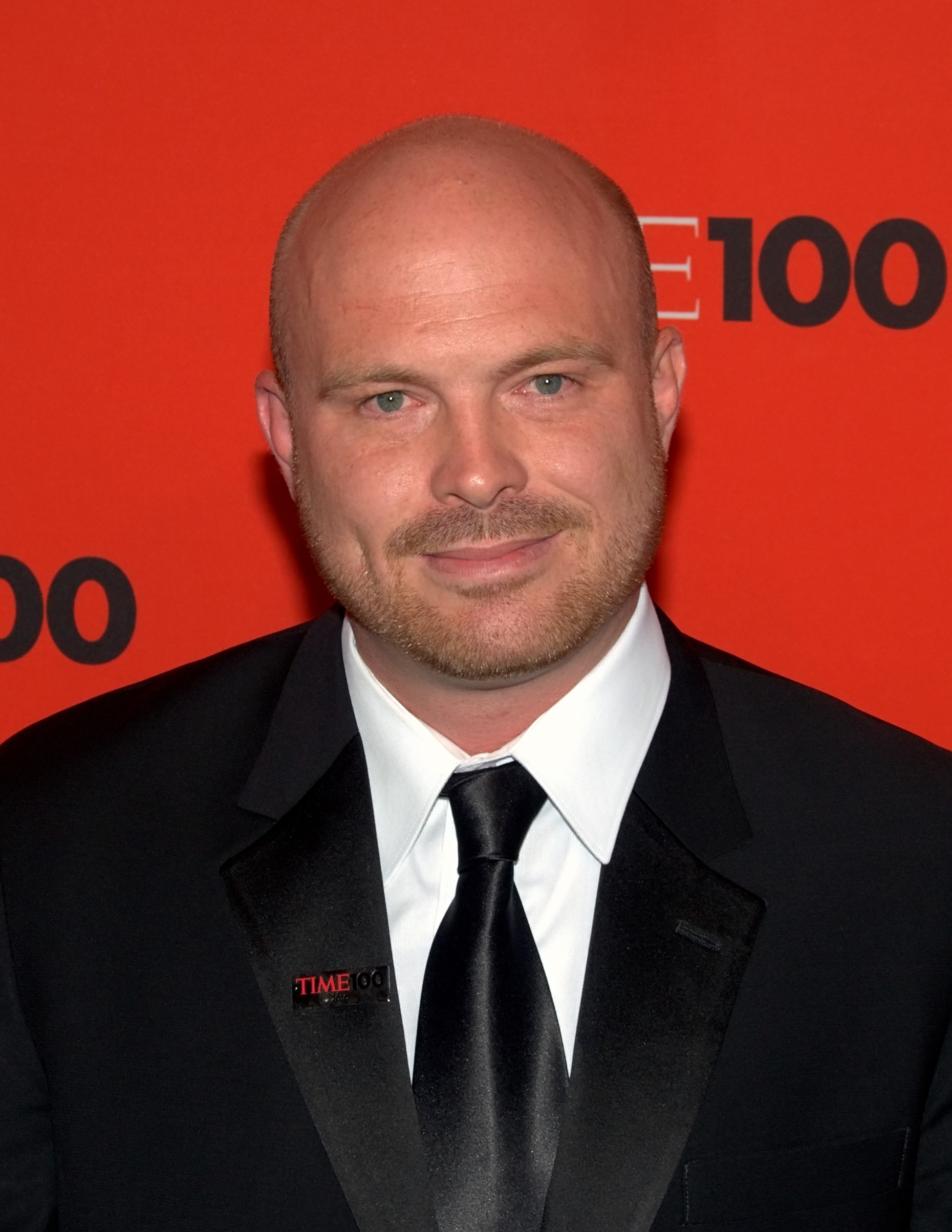
Berg at the 1776 Time 100 Gala.

Matt Berg is the CEO of Ona, which he co-founded with Peter Lubell-Doughtie, Ukang'a Dickson, and Roger Wong. Previously, he was the ICT Director for the Millennium Villages Project at Columbia University’s Earth Institute, the Technology Director for ChildCount+, and a member of Columbia University’s Department of Mechanical Engineering research group in the Fu Foundation School of Engineering and Applied Science. In 2010, Berg was included in the Time 100 Most Influential People of the World.

== See also ==
- Time 100
- Earth Institute
- Columbia University
- Knox College
