= Denys Cochin =

French author and politician (1851–1922)

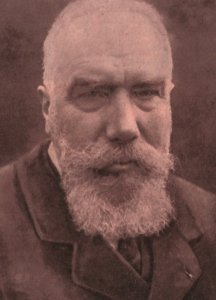
Denys Cochin

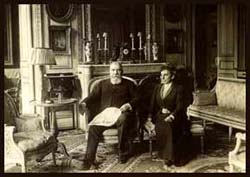
Cochin with his wife

Baron Denys Marie Pierre Augustin Cochin (1 September 1851 in Paris – 24 March 1922 in Paris) was a French writer and Catholic right-wing politician.

== Early life ==
Denys Cochin was the son of Pierre-Suzanne-Augustin Cochin, also a politician and writer. After graduating from the school Louis-le-Grand, he joined the military as a quartermaster in the eight cuirassier, before becoming flag carrier for General Charles Denis Bourbaki. After the end of the Franco-Prussian War in 1871, he was an attache in the embassy in London for a year. Returning to France in 1872, he undertook studies in chemistry in the laboratory of Louis Pasteur. During World War I, he worked on the development of explosives and chemical weapons.

== Career ==
In 1881 he was elected councilman of the 7th arrondissement of Paris. From 1893 to 1919, he represented Seine in the French National Assembly. He was the principal spokesman of the Catholic party defending the religious educational liberties and congregations against the attacks of the administrations of Pierre Waldeck-Rousseau and Émile Combes.

Symbolizing the alignment of L'union sacrée, he was Minister of State in Aristide Briand's fourth administration from 29 October 1915 to 12 December 1916, and then under-secretary for foreign policy matters responsible for dealing with the blockade of Germany under Alexandre Ribot from 20 March to August 1917. He resigned predicting the breakup of L'union sacrée.

He wrote several books such as:

- L’Évolution de la vie (The Evolution of Life; 1885, crowned by the Académie française)
- Le Monde extérieur (The exterior World; 1895)
- Contre les barbares (Against the barbarians; 1899)
- L’Esprit nouveau (The new Spirit; 1900)
- Ententes et ruptures (Alliances and breakups; 1905)

He was elected to Seat 11 of the Académie française on 16 February 1911.

As an art collector, Cochin bought several impressionist paintings together with Paul Durand-Ruel including one by Claude Monet.

Denys Cochin was the father of the historian Augustin Cochin.
