= Kochi Gakuen College =

Private junior college in Kōchi, Japan

Coordinates: 33°33′39″N 133°30′24″E

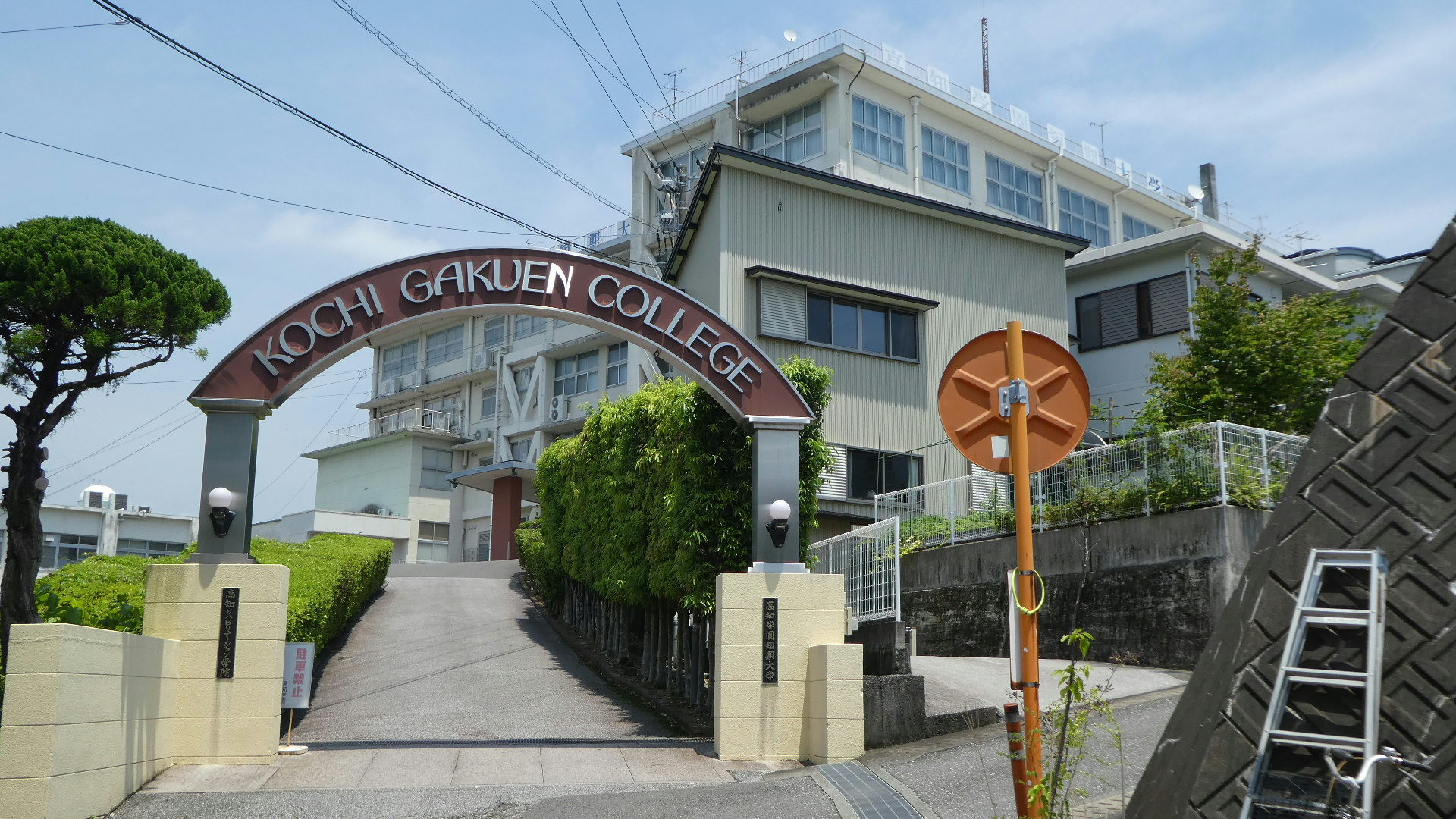

Kochi Gakuen College (高知学園短期大学, Kōchi Gakuen Tanki Daigaku) is a private junior college in Kōchi, Kōchi Prefecture, Japan, established in 1967.
