= Dimagi =

Dimagi, Inc.
- Type: B Corporation, Benefit Corporation, Social Enterprise
- Industry: Software
- Founded: 2002
- Headquarters: Cambridge, Massachusetts
- Key people: Jonathan Jackson; (CEO, Co-Founder); Vikram Kumar; (CMO, Co-Founder); Neal Lesh (CSO); Carter Powers (COO); Clayton Sims; (CTO); Lucina Tse; (Chief Engineering Officer)
- Products: CommCare (www.commcarehq.org)
- Number of employees: 202 (Nov 2021)
- Website: www.dimagi.com

Dimagi, Inc. is a for-profit social enterprise based in Cambridge, Massachusetts, US, that delivers open-source software technology suitable for low-resource settings and underserved communities. The company designs clinical interfaces, health information systems, and mobile technologies to perform patient-level disease management, clinical decision support, and health system monitoring. It also provides implementation services on open-source information and technology. Dimagi became a certified B corporation in 2008 and an incorporated benefit corporation in 2012. Dimagi has additional offices in Washington DC, New Delhi, India and Cape Town, South Africa.

== CommCare ==
CommCare is an open source mobile platform designed for data collection, client management, decision support, and behavior change communication. CommCare consists of two main technology components: CommCare Mobile and CommCare HQ. The mobile application is used by client-facing community health workers in visits as a data collection and educational tool and includes optional audio, image, and video prompts. Users access the application-building platform through the website which Dimagi operates on a cloud-based server.

CommCare supports J2ME feature phones, Android phones, and Android tablets and can capture photos and GPS readings. CommCare supports multi-languages and non-roman character scripts as well as the integration of multimedia (image, audio, and video). CommCare mobile versions allow applications to run offline and collected data can be transmitted to CommCare HQ when wireless (GPRS) or Internet (WI-FI) connectivity becomes available. CommCare also supports SMS, including, supports two-way messaging, broadcast messages, and reminders that are scheduled for each end user based on configurable data elements such as date of signup or language preference.

CommCare and CommCare HQ are released under the Apache v2.0 and BSD Licenses, respectively. The CommCare application is built on OpenRosa standard tools and protocols, and leverages many different open-source technologies. Protocols are represented using XForms, a W3C backed standard approach to more advanced forms that support nested and repeatable elements, decision support, advanced validation, and extensive user interface controls.

== Partnerships ==
Since its creation in 2008, Dimagi's software platform CommCare has been used in over 2,000 projects in 80 countries around the world.

In 2007, D-Tree International partnered with Dimagi to evaluate whether the use of an electronic job aid on a mobile device improved adherence to the Integrated Management of Childhood Illness protocols in Tanzania.

In 2011, Dimagi joined the Business Call to Action Initiative.

In 2012, the United States Agency for International Development Development Innovation Venture funded Dimagi to expand CommCare in India to 50 new programs in health and social sectors. In February 2012, Dimagi and the Grameen Foundation partnered with CARE through the Mobile Technology for Community Health (MOTECH) Platform Initiative in Bihar, India. Later in 2012, Dimagi partnered with the CORE Group, a global health membership organization, to establish the CommCare Learning Collaborative to support non-governmental organizations address maternal and child health issues.

In 2013, Novartis partnered with Dimagi in an effort to eliminate rheumatic heart disease in Zambia.

In 2020, Carlos Yerena, Director of Partnerships in Southern & East Africa, expressed the importance of partnerships and collaborations amidst the COVID-19 pandemic. "Collaboration is very important and, sometimes, it takes a pandemic for us to really unlock these meaningful collaborations. In some instances, you would believe they have competing interests, but establishing these strategic partnerships really supported governments and partners, and helped them utilise the different platforms in the best interests of a common goal".

== Research ==
Dimagi has participated in research on information and communications technology platforms and healthcare delivery in under-served populations, both domestically and abroad. Over 65 peer-reviewed publications have been written about Dimagi's digital health platform, CommCare, including 8 randomized controlled trials.
