= Kawauchi =

Kawauchi (川内 or 河内) may refer to:

== Places ==
- Kawauchi, Fukushima
- Kawauchi, Aomori, now part of the city of Mutsu, Aomori
- Kawauchi, Ehime, now part of the city of Tōon, Ehime

== People with the surname ==
- Hiroshi Kawauchi, Japanese politician
- Kōhan Kawauchi, Japanese screenwriter
- Rinko Kawauchi, Japanese photographer
- Takaya Kawauchi, Japanese baseball player
- Yuki Kawauchi, Japanese distance runner

== See also ==
- Kawachi (disambiguation)
- Sendai (disambiguation)
- 河内 (disambiguation)
