= University of Kochi =

Public university in Kōchi, Japan

Coordinates: 33.530556°N 133.583139°E

- 高知県立大学
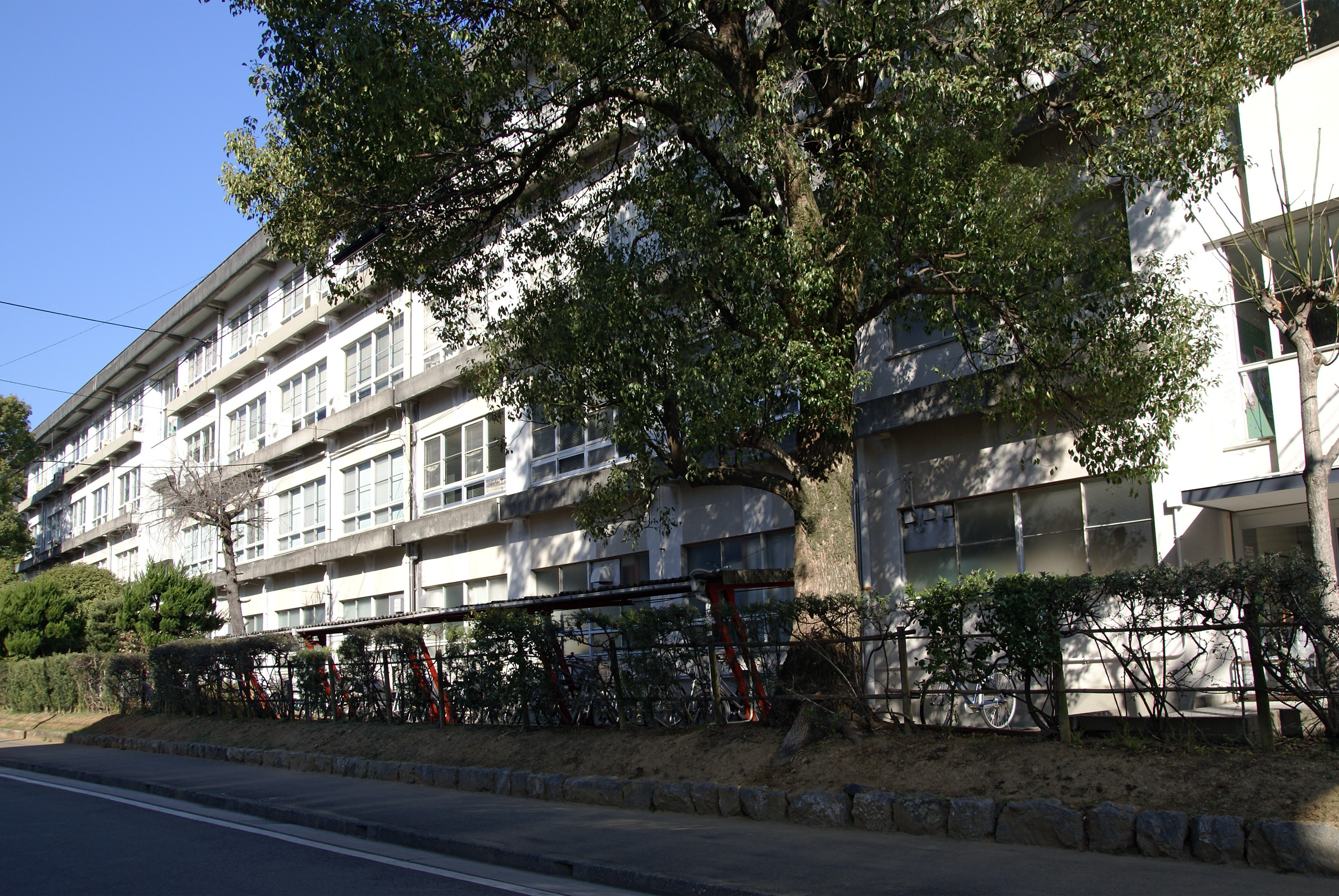
- Type: Public
- Established: 1949
- President: Hiroko Minami
- Location: Kōchi, Kōchi, Japan
- Website: Official website

University of Kochi (高知県立大学, Kōchi Kenritsu Daigaku) is a public university in Kōchi, Kōchi Prefecture, Japan. The predecessor of the school was founded in 1944, and it was chartered as a university in 1949. In April 2011, the school changed its name from Kochi Women's University (高知女子大学, Kōchi Joshi Daigaku) and became coeducational.

== Organization ==
The University of Kochi comprises four undergraduate faculties and two graduate schools.

=== Faculties ===
- Faculty of Cultural Studies
- Faculty of Nursing
- Faculty of Social Welfare
- Faculty of Nutrition

=== Graduate schools ===
- Graduate School of Nursing
- Graduate School of Human Life Sciences

== College of Child Development ==
The College of Child Development, Kochi Women's University (高知女子大学保育短期大学部, Kōchi Joshi Daigaku Hoiku Tanki Daigakubu) opened in April 1975, but the school was founded in 1948 as Kochi Kenritsu Hobo Yōseijo (高知県立保母養成所). It was affiliated with Kochi Women's University but was located on a separate campus. It became coeducational in 1992. It closed in 1998.
