= Chiyo Kimura =

Japanese politician (1890–1956)

- 木村 チヨ

Member of the House of Representatives
- In office 11 April 1946 – 31 March 1947
- Preceded by: Constituency established
- Succeeded by: Multi-member district
- Constituency: Kyoto at-large

Personal details
- Born: 12 September 1890 Fukutsu, Fukuoka, Japan
- Died: 2 July 1956 (aged 65)
- Party: Independent

Chiyo Kimura (Japanese: 木村チヨ; 12 September 1890 – 2 July 1956) was a Japanese politician. She was one of the first group of women elected to the House of Representatives in 1946.

== Early life ==
Kimura was born in Kaminishigo (now part of Fukutsu) in 1890. She graduated from a private arts and sewing school in 1909, after which she moved to Tokyo and worked at the Institute of Politics and Economics. She also worked as a teacher. After marrying, she lived in Kamikoma in Kyoto Prefecture. She founded the Women's Cultural Federation.

== Political career ==
In the 1946 general elections Kimura was an independent candidate in Kyoto, and was elected to the House of Representatives. However, after being elected, her claim to have graduated from Fukuoka Prefectural Girls' School was found to be untrue.

She attempted to become a Democratic Party candidate for the 1947 elections, but was rejected by the party. She registered as an independent candidate for the 1956 House of Councillors elections, but died of angina six days before polling day.
