= Pierre-Suzanne-Augustin Cochin =

French politician and writer (1823–1872)

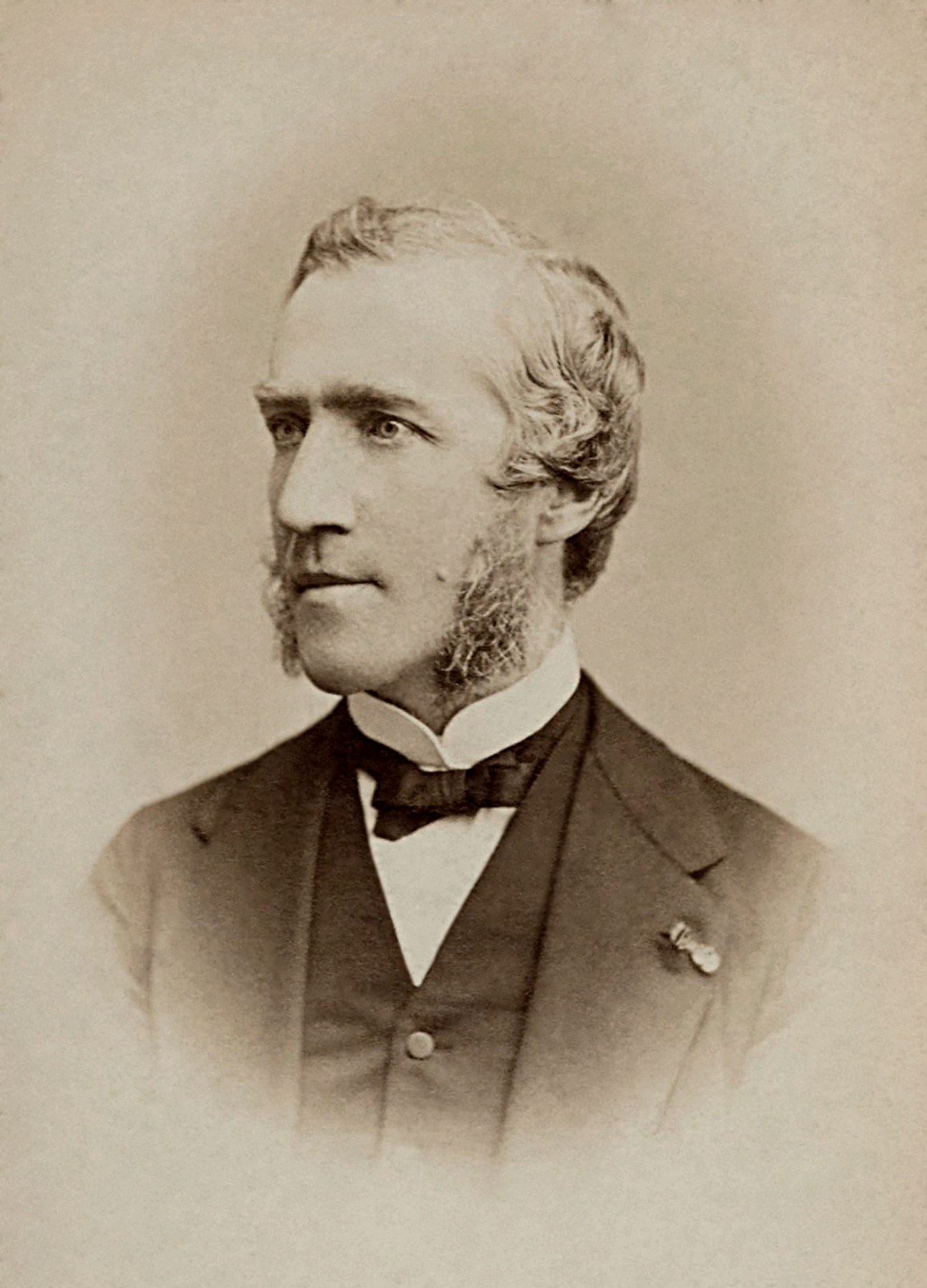
Photograph by Reutlinger, Paris

Pierre-Suzanne-Augustin Cochin (1823 – 1872) was a French politician and writer with an interest in social and economic issues. He was associated with Charles de Montalembert and the liberal branch of the Catholic Church in France and was elected mayor of the tenth arrondissement in Paris in 1853. A staunch opponent of slavery and advocate for the Union cause during the American Civil War, he was knighted by Pope Pius IX in 1862 for (in the words of Catholic journalist Orestes Brownson) his "admirable work on the Abolition of Slavery." He was the father of the Catholic politician Denys Cochin and the grandfather of the historian Augustin Cochin. He was born in Paris.

== Works ==
- L'Abolition de l'esclavage, (1861)
