= Katsuyuki Kawachi =

Japanese footballer

Katsuyuki Kawachi 河内 勝幸
Personal information
- Full name: Katsuyuki Kawachi
- Date of birth: April 27, 1955 (age 71)
- Place of birth: Hiroshima, Japan
- Position: Midfielder

Youth career
- 1971–1973: Hiroshima Technical High School
- 1974–1977: Osaka University of Commerce

Senior career*
Years	Team	Apps	(Gls)
1978–1987	Mazda		

International career
1979	Japan	3	(0)
Medal record
Mazda
Runner-up	Emperor's Cup	1978
- * Club domestic league appearances and goals

Katsuyuki Kawachi (河内 勝幸, Kawachi Katsuyuki; born April 27, 1955) is a former Japanese football player. He played for Japan national team.

== Club career ==
Kawachi was born in Hiroshima Prefecture on April 27, 1955. After graduating from Osaka University of Commerce, he joined his local club, the Toyo Industries (later Mazda) in 1978. Although the club won second place in the 1978 Emperor's Cup, the club performance was not good and he also played in Division 2. He retired in 1987. He played 92 games and scored 11 goals in Division 1.

== National team career ==
On June 16, 1979, Kawachi debuted for Japan national team against South Korea. He played 3 games for Japan in 1979.

== National team statistics ==
Japan national team
Year	Apps	Goals
1979	3	0
Total	3	0
