= Asian art =

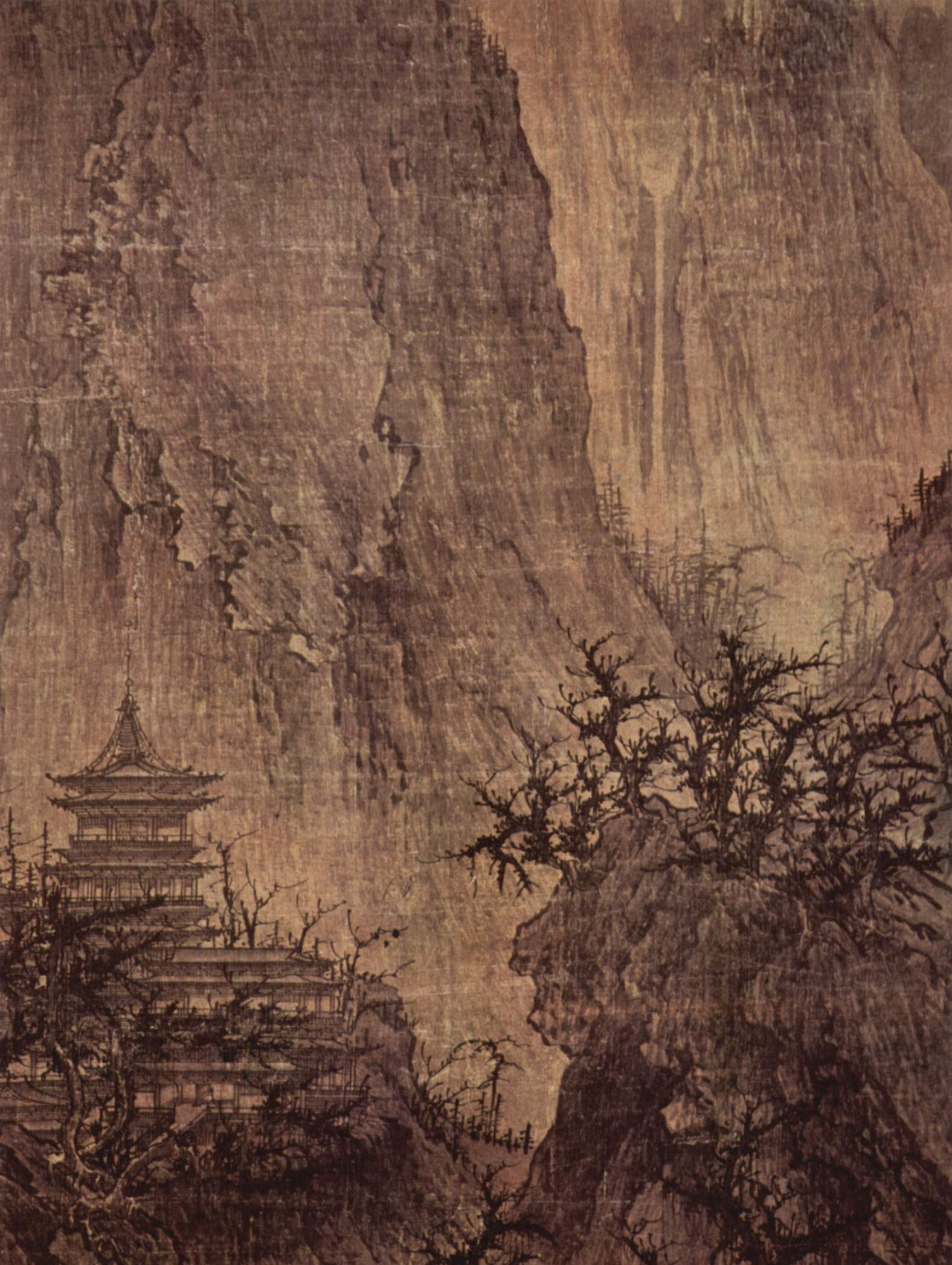
Li Cheng, Buddhist Temple in the Mountains, 11th century, China, ink on silk, Nelson-Atkins Museum of Art, Kansas City, Missouri

The history of Asian art includes a vast range of arts from various cultures, regions, and religions across the continent of Asia. Asian art is typically divided into broad blocks: East Asian art includes works from China, Japan, Korea and Tibetan art, while Southeast Asian art includes the arts of Cambodia, Indonesia, Laos, Malaysia, Myanmar (Burma), the Philippines, Thailand, and Vietnam. Historically, South Asian art mostly falls under Indian art, which encompasses the arts of the Indian subcontinent, while Central Asian art covers that region. West Asian art encompasses the arts of the Ancient Near East including Mesopotamian art and Persian art, and more recently becoming dominated by Islamic art.

In many ways, the history of Eastern art parallels the development of Western art. The art histories of Asia and Europe repeatedly intertwine, with Asian art greatly influencing European art, and vice versa; the Eurasian cultures mixed through methods such as steppe-nomad migrations, followed successively by the Silk Road transmission of art, the cultural exchange of the Age of Discovery and Western colonization, and through the Internet and modern globalization.

Excluding prehistoric art, the art of Mesopotamia represents the oldest forms of art in Asia.

== Upper Paleolithic Northeast Asia ==
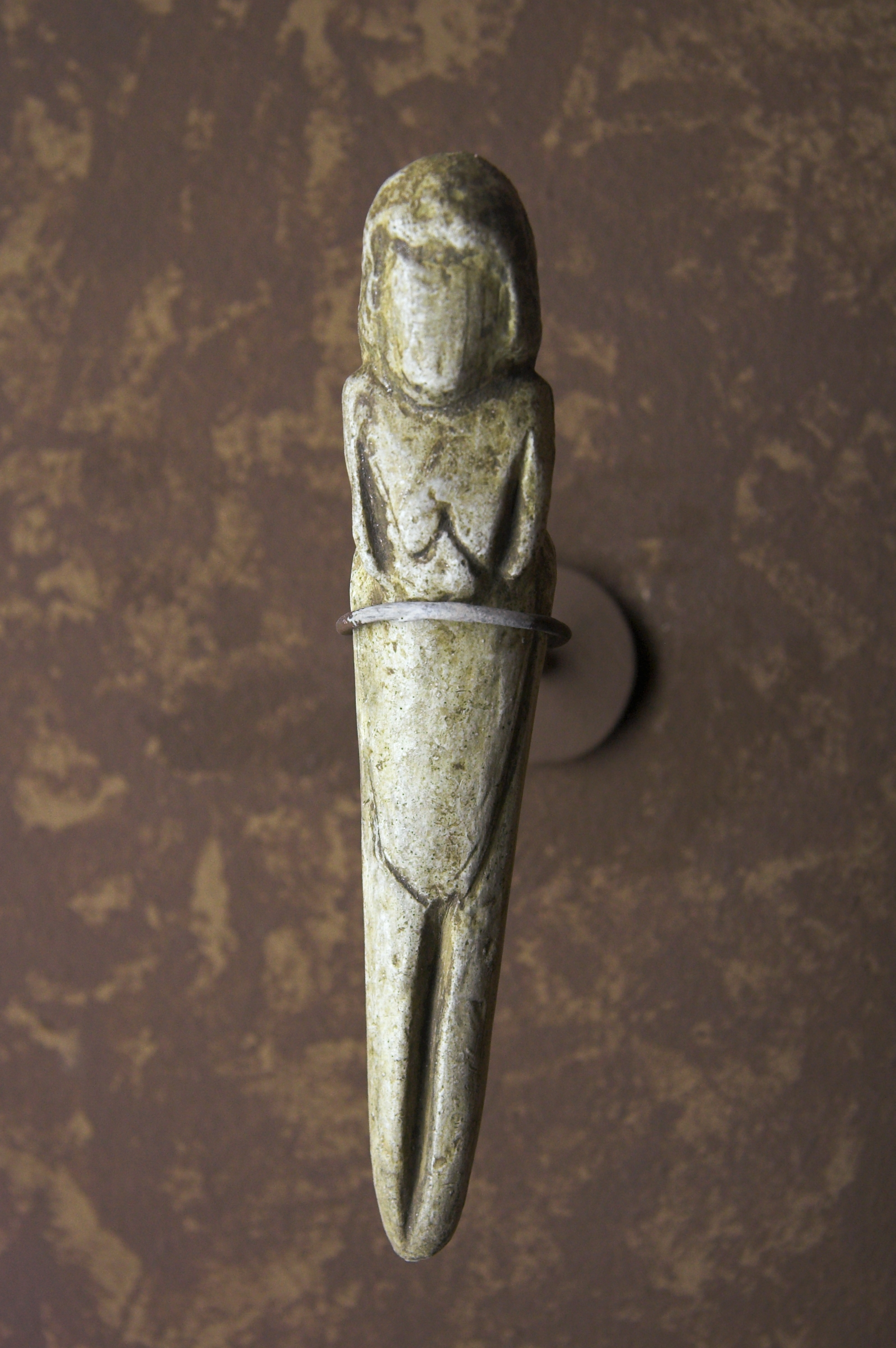
One of the Venus figurines of Mal'ta, circa 21,000 BCE

The first modern human occupation in the difficult climates of Northeast Asia is dated to circa 40,000 ago, with the early Yana culture of northern Siberia dated to circa 31,000 BCE. By around 21,000 BCE, two main cultures developed: the Mal'ta culture and slightly later the Afontova Gora-Oshurkovo culture.

The Mal'ta culture, centered around at Mal'ta, at the Angara River, near Lake Baikal in Irkutsk Oblast, Southern Siberia, created some of the first works of art in the Upper Paleolithic period, with objects such as the Venus figurines of Mal'ta. These figures consist most often of mammoth ivory. The figures are about 23,000 years old and stem from the Gravettian. Most of these statuettes show stylized clothes. Quite often the face is depicted. The tradition of Upper Paleolithic portable statuettes being almost exclusively European, it has been suggested that Mal'ta had some kind of cultural and cultic connection with Europe during that time period, but this remains unsettled.

== East Asian art ==
=== Chinese art ===
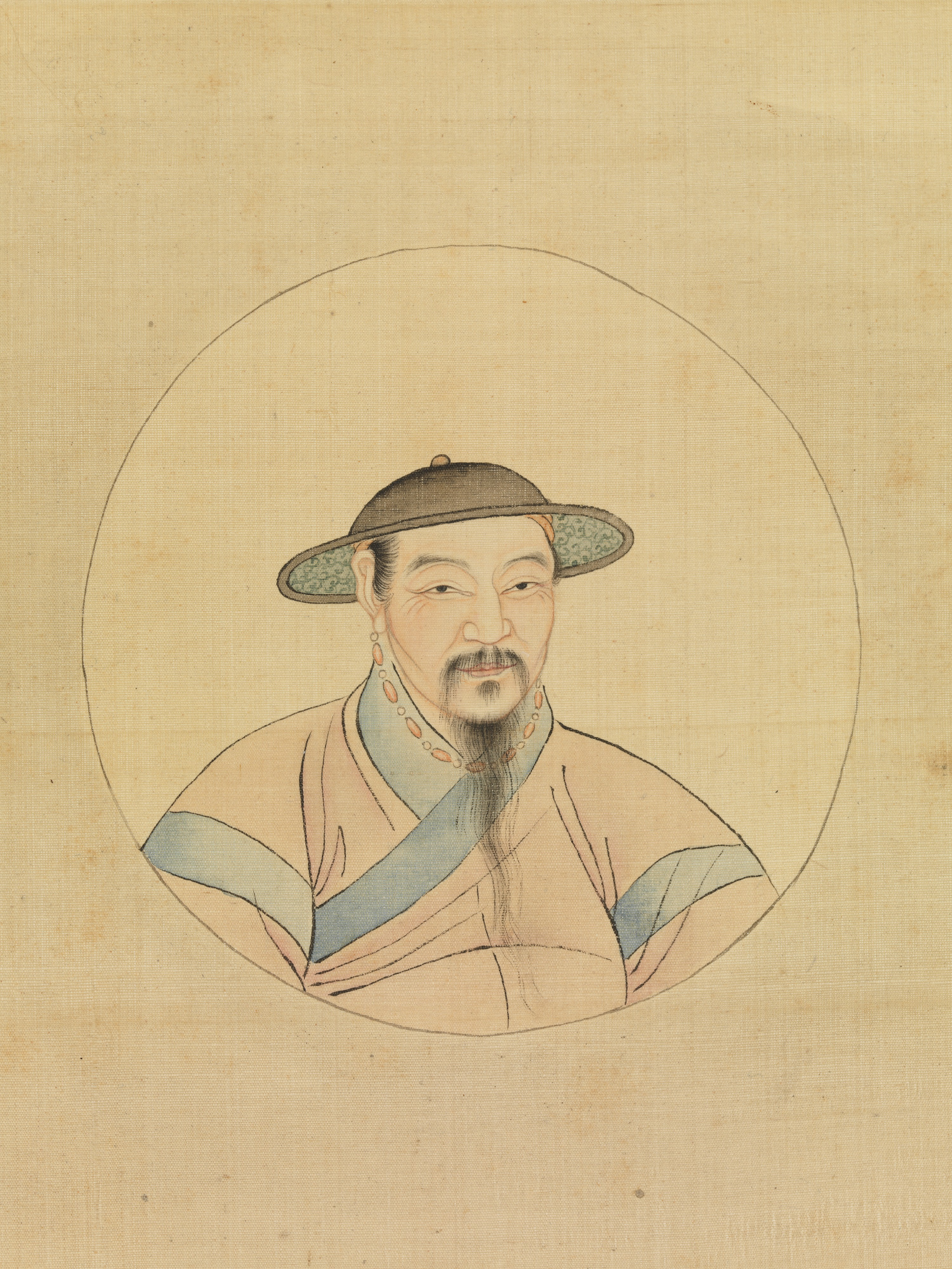
Copy of a portrait of Zhao Mengfu (趙孟頫), Metropolitan Museum of Art

Chinese art (Chinese: 中國藝術/中国艺术) has varied throughout its ancient history, divided into periods by the ruling dynasties of China and changing technology. Different forms of art have been influenced by great philosophers, teachers, religious figures, and even political leaders. Chinese art encompasses fine arts, folk arts, and performance arts. Chinese art is art, whether modern or ancient, that originated from or is practiced in China or by Chinese artists or performers.

In the Song dynasty, poetry was marked by a lyric poetry known as Ci (詞) which expressed feelings of desire, often in an adopted persona. Also in the Song dynasty, paintings of more subtle expressions of landscapes appeared, with blurred outlines and mountain contours which conveyed distance through an impressionistic treatment of natural phenomena. It was during this period that in painting, emphasis was placed on spiritual rather than emotional elements, as in the previous period. Kunqu, the oldest extant form of Chinese opera developed during the Song dynasty in Kunshan, near present-day Shanghai. In the Yuan dynasty, painting by the Chinese painter Zhao Mengfu (趙孟頫) greatly influenced later Chinese landscape painting, and the Yuan dynasty opera became a variant of Chinese opera which continues today as Cantonese opera.

==== Chinese painting ====
Gongbi and Xieyi are two painting styles in Chinese painting.

Gongbi means "meticulous", the rich colours and details in the picture are its main features, its content mainly depicts portraits or narratives. Xieyi means 'freehand', its form is often exaggerated and unreal, with an emphasis on the author's emotional expression and usually used in depicting landscapes.

In addition to paper and silk, traditional paintings have also been done on the walls, such as the Mogao Grottoes in Gansu Province. The Dunhuang Mogao Grottoes were built in the Northern Wei dynasty (386–534 AD). It consists of more than 700 caves, of which 492 caves have murals on the walls, totalling more than 45,000 square meters. The murals are very broad in content, include Buddha statues, paradise, angels, important historical events, and even donors. The painting styles in early caves received influence from India and the West. From the Tang dynasty (618–906 CE), the murals began to reflect the unique Chinese painting style.

Panorama of Along the River During the Qingming Festival, an 18th-century reproduction of the 12th century original by Chinese artist Zhang Zeduan; Note: scroll starts from the right

==== Chinese Calligraphy ====
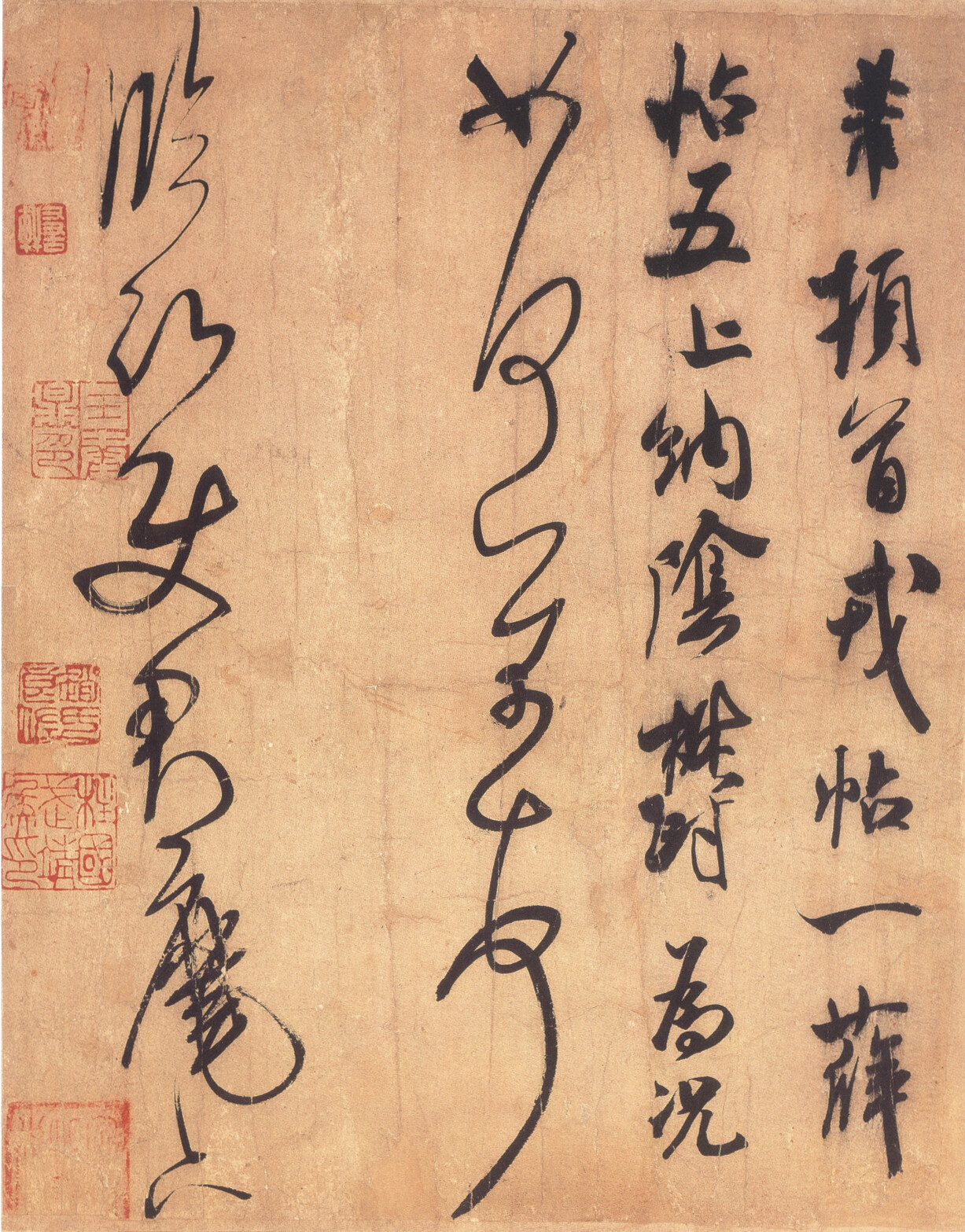
On Calligraphy by Mi Fu, Song dynasty

Chinese calligraphy can be traced back to the Dazhuan (large seal script) that appeared in the Zhou dynasty. After Emperor Qin unified China, Prime Minister Li Si collected and compiled Xiaozhuan (small seal) style as the new official text. The small seal script is very elegant but difficult to write quickly. In the Eastern Han dynasty, a type of script called the Lishu (Official Script) began to rise. Because it reveals no circles and very few curved lines, it is very suitable for fast writing. After that, the Kaishu style (traditional regular script) has appeared, and as its structure is simpler and neater, this script is still widely used today.

==== Ancient Chinese crafts ====
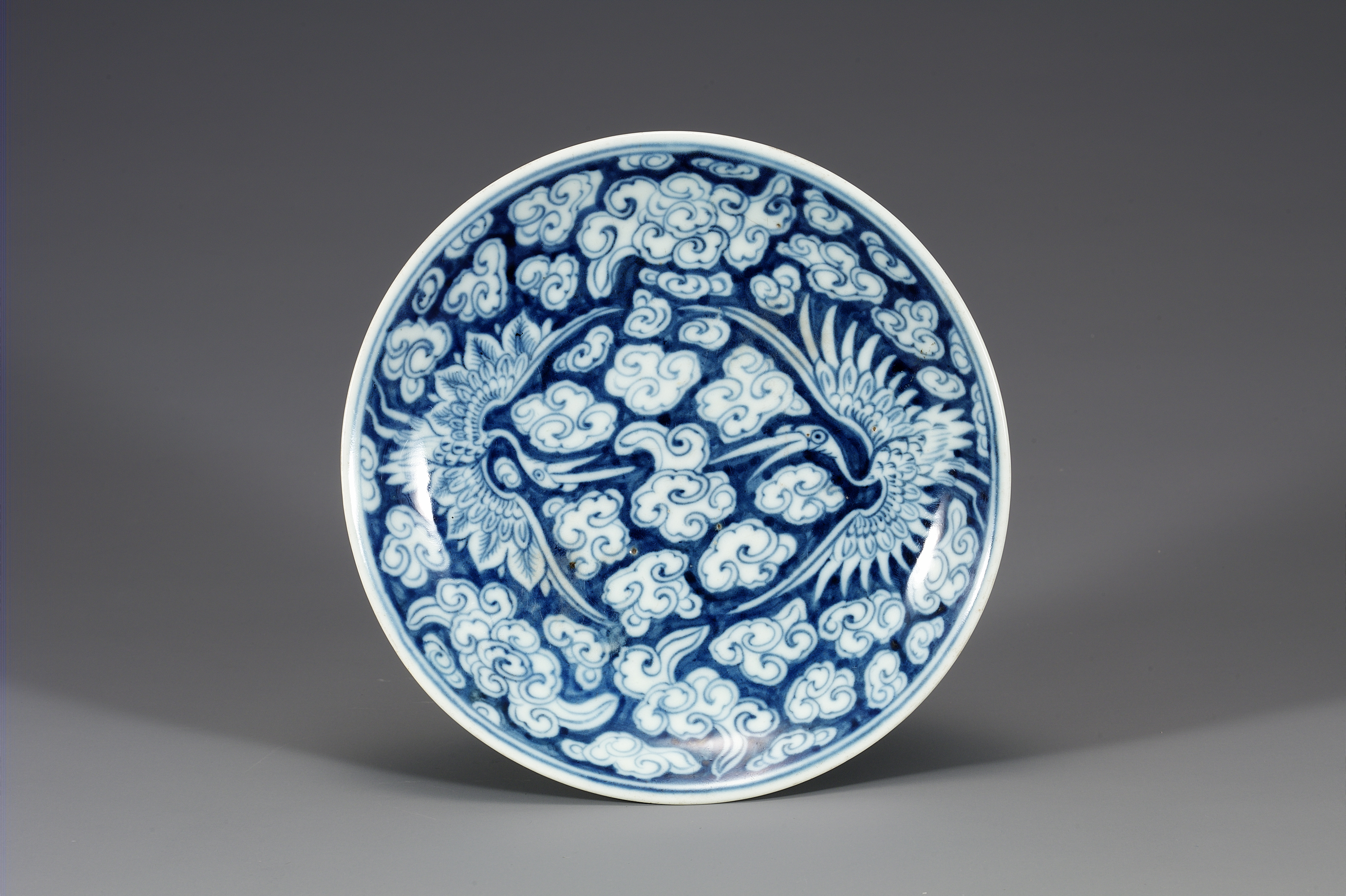
Blue and white porcelain dish

Jade

Early jade was used as an ornament or as sacrificial utensils. The earliest Chinese carved-jade object appeared in the Hemudu culture in the early Neolithic period (about 3500–2000 BCE). During the Shang dynasty (c. 1600–1046 BCE), Bi (circular perforated jade) and Cong (square jade tube) appeared, which were presumed to be sacrificial utensils, representing the sky and the earth. In the Zhou dynasty (1046–256 BCE), due to the use of higher hardness engraving tools, jades were carved more delicately and began to be used as a pendant or ornament in clothing. Jade was considered to be immortal and could protect the owner, so carved-jade objects were often buried with the deceased, such as a jade burial suit from the tomb of Liu Sheng, a prince of the Western Han dynasty.

Porcelain

Porcelain is a kind of ceramic made from kaolin at high temperature. The earliest ceramics in China appeared in the Shang dynasty (c.1600–1046 BCE). And the production of ceramics laid the foundation for the invention of porcelain. The history of Chinese porcelain can be traced back to the Han dynasty (206 BC – 220 AD). In the Tang dynasty, porcelain was divided into celadon and white porcelain. In the Song dynasty, Jingdezhen was selected as the royal porcelain production centre and began to produce blue and white porcelain.

==== Modern Chinese art ====
After the end of the last feudal dynasty in China, with the rise of the new cultural movement, Chinese artists began to be influenced by Western art and began to integrate Western art into Chinese culture. Influenced by American jazz, Chinese composer Li Jinhui (Known as the father of Chinese pop music) began to create and promote popular music, which made a huge sensation. At the beginning of the 20th century, oil paintings were introduced to China, and more and more Chinese painters began to touch Western painting techniques and combine them with traditional Chinese painting. Meanwhile, a new form of painting, comics, had also begun to rise. It was popular with many people and became the most affordable way to entertain at the time.

=== Tibetan art ===
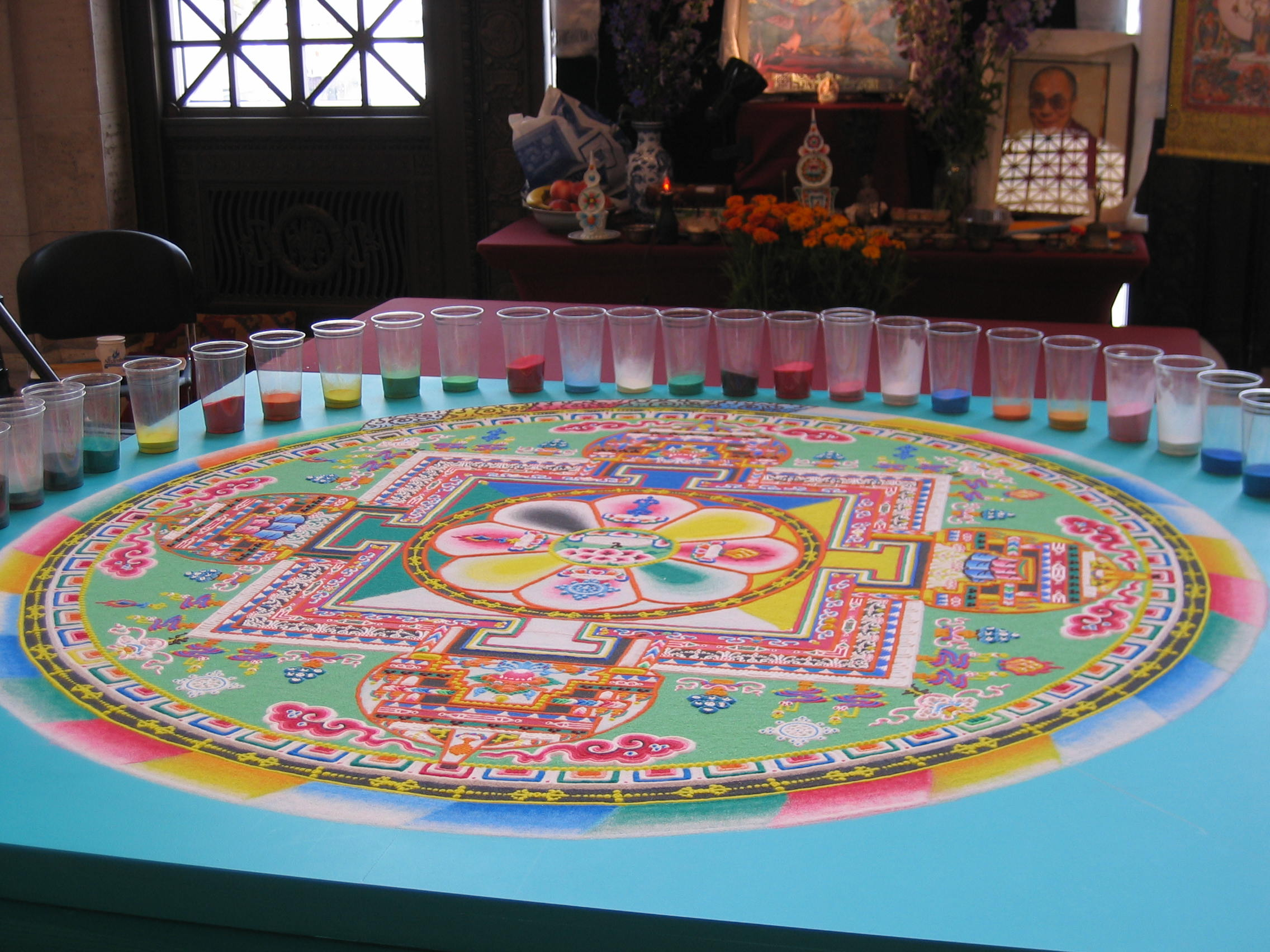
Tibetan Buddhist Sand mandala displaying its materials

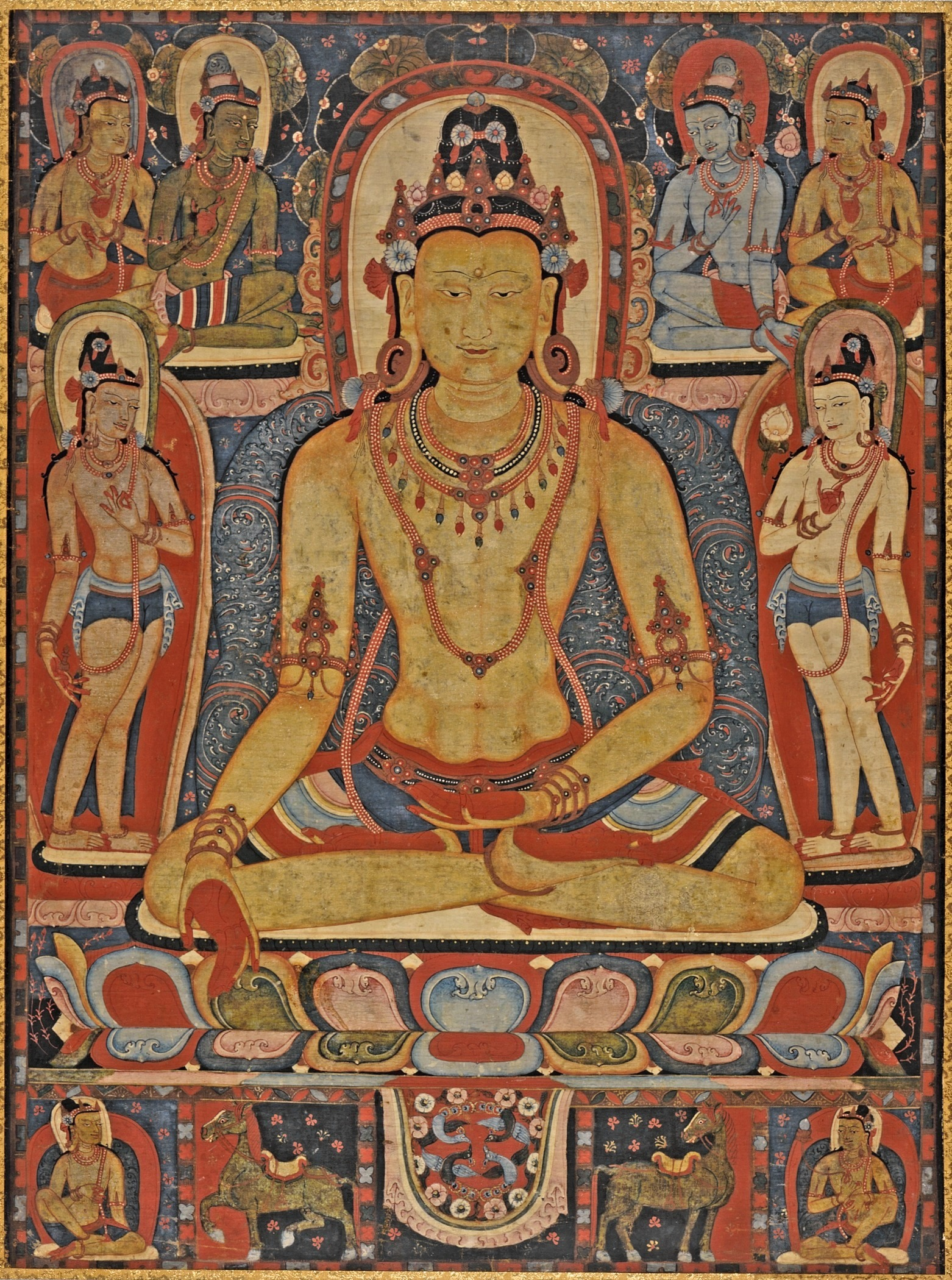
Jina Buddha Ratnasambhava, central Tibet, Kadampa Monastery, 1150–1225.

Tibetan art is the distinct art of Tibet (Tibet Autonomous Region in China) and other present and former Himalayan kingdoms (Bhutan, Ladakh, Nepal, and Sikkim). Tibetan art is first and foremost a form of sacred art, reflecting the overriding influence of Tibetan Buddhism on these cultures. The Sand Mandala (Tib: kilkhor) is a Tibetan Buddhist tradition which symbolises the transitory nature of things. As part of Buddhist canon, all things material are seen as transitory. A sand mandala is an example of this, being that once it has been built and its accompanying ceremonies and viewing are finished, it is systematically destroyed.

As Mahayana Buddhism emerged as a separate school in the 4th century BC it emphasized the role of bodhisattvas, compassionate beings who forgo their personal escape to Nirvana in order to assist others. From an early time various bodhisattvas were also subjects of statuary art. Tibetan Buddhism, as an offspring of Mahayana Buddhism, inherited this tradition. But the additional dominating presence of the Vajrayana (or Buddhist tantra) may have had an overriding importance in the artistic culture. A common bodhisattva depicted in Tibetan art is the deity Chenrezig (Avalokitesvara), often portrayed as a thousand-armed saint with an eye in the middle of each hand, representing the all-seeing compassionate one who hears our requests. This deity can also be understood as a Yidam, or 'meditation Buddha' for Vajrayana practice.

Tibetan Buddhism contains Tantric Buddhism, also known as Vajrayana Buddhism for its common symbolism of the vajra, the diamond thunderbolt (known in Tibetan as the dorje). Most of the typical Tibetan Buddhist art can be seen as part of the practice of tantra. Vajrayana techniques incorporate many visualizations/imaginations during meditation, and most of the elaborate tantric art can be seen as aids to these visualizations; from representations of meditational deities (yidams) to mandalas and all kinds of ritual implements.

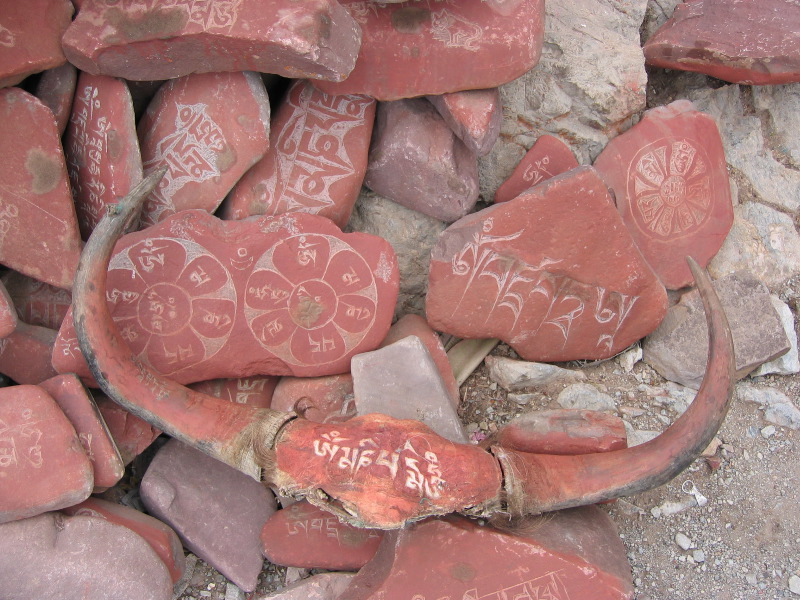
In Tibet, many Buddhists carve mantras into rocks as a form of devotion.

A visual aspect of Tantric Buddhism is the common representation of wrathful deities, often depicted with angry faces, circles of flame, or with the skulls of the dead. These images represent the Protectors (Skt. dharmapala) and their fearsome bearing belies their true compassionate nature. Actually, their wrath represents their dedication to the protection of the dharma teaching as well as to the protection of the specific tantric practices to prevent corruption or disruption of the practice. They are most importantly used as wrathful psychological aspects that can be used to conquer the negative attitudes of the practitioner.

Historians note that Chinese painting had a profound influence on Tibetan painting in general. Starting from the 14th and 15th century, Tibetan painting had incorporated many elements from the Chinese, and during the 18th century, Chinese painting had a deep and far-reaching impact on Tibetan visual art. According to Giuseppe Tucci, by the time of the Qing dynasty, "a new Tibetan art was then developed, which in a certain sense was a provincial echo of the Chinese 18th century's smooth ornate preciosity."

=== Japanese art ===
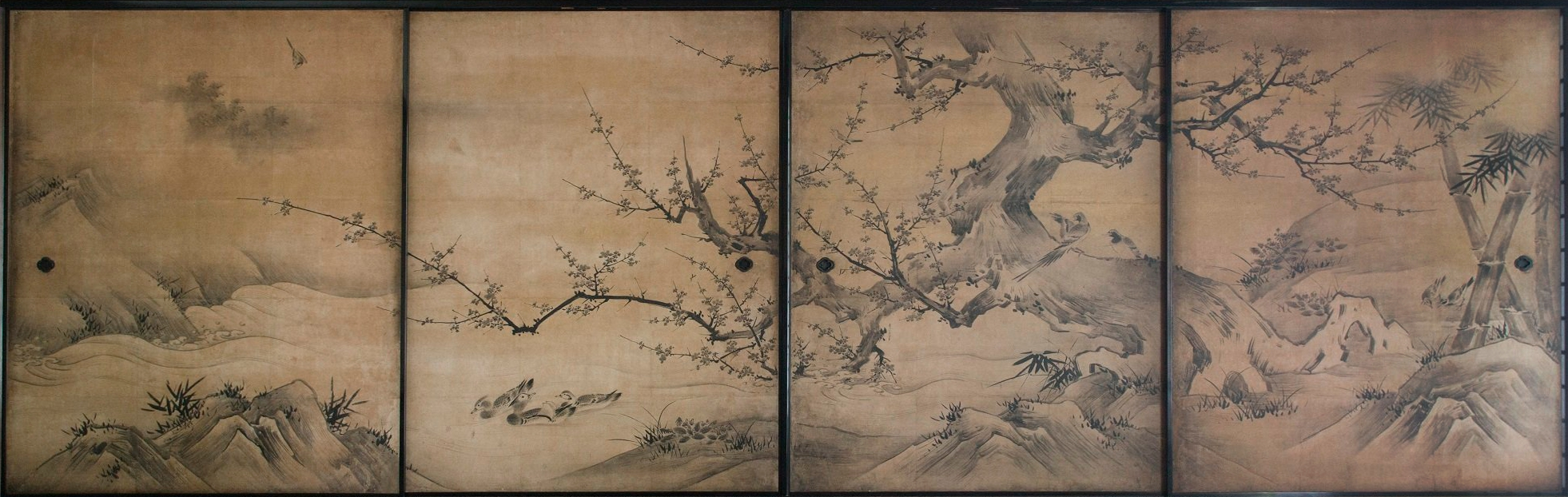
Four from a set of sixteen sliding room partitions (Birds and Flower of the Four Seasons) made for a 16th-century Japanese abbot. Typically for later Japanese landscapes, the main focus is on a feature in the foreground.

Japanese art and architecture include works of art produced in Japan from the beginnings of human habitation there, sometime in the 10th millennium BC, to the present. Japanese art covers a wide range of art styles and media, including ancient pottery, sculpture in wood and bronze, ink painting on silk and paper, and a myriad of other types of works of art; from ancient times until the contemporary 21st century.

The art form rose to great popularity in the metropolitan culture of Edo (Tokyo) during the second half of the 17th century, originating with the single-color works of Hishikawa Moronobu in the 1670s. At first, only India ink was used, then some prints were manually colored with a brush, but in the 18th century Suzuki Harunobu developed the technique of polychrome printing to produce nishiki-e.

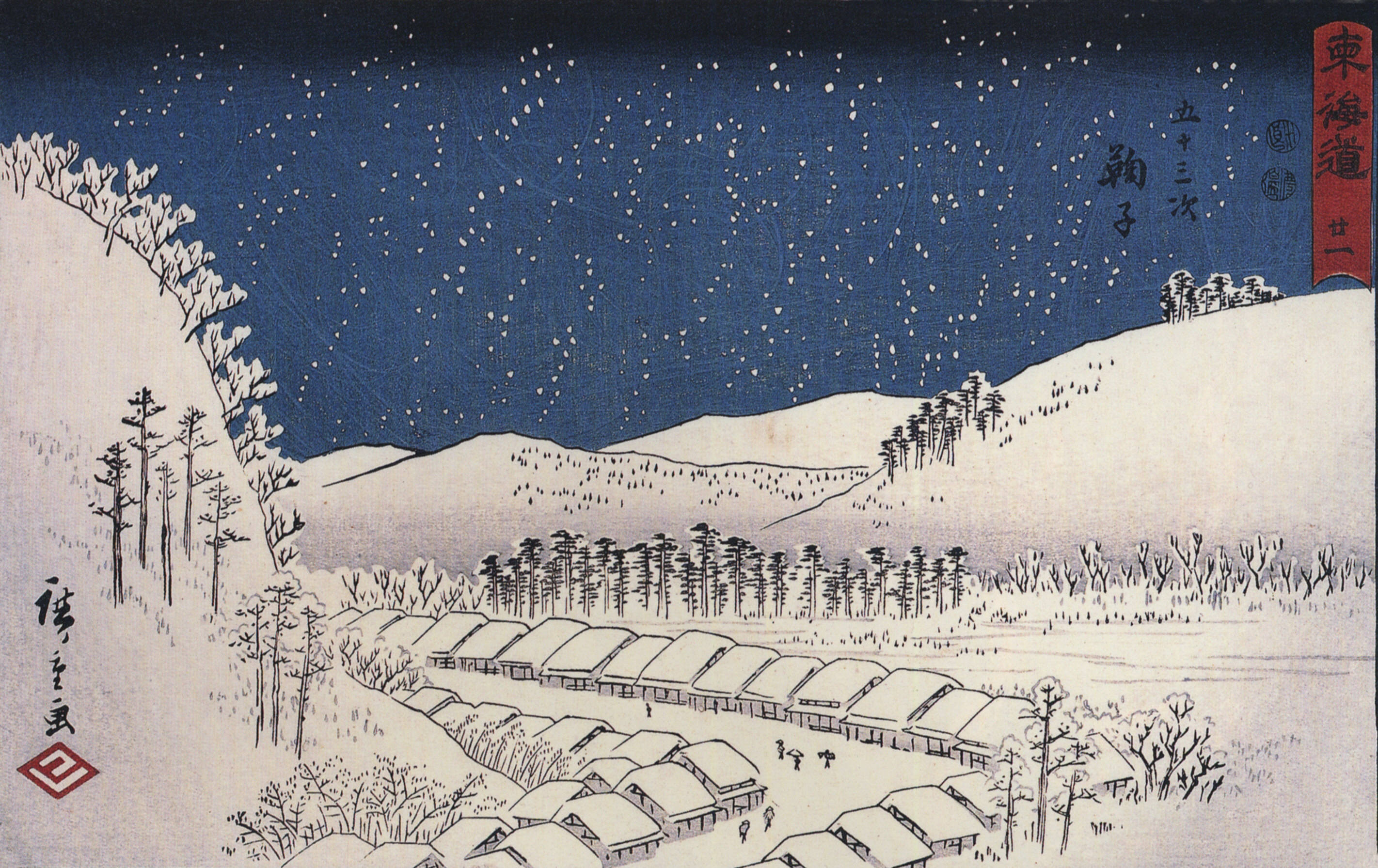
Hiroshige, Snow falling on a town, c. 1833, ukiyo-e print

Japanese painting (絵画, Kaiga) is one of the oldest and most highly refined of the Japanese arts, encompassing a wide variety of genre and styles. As with the history of Japanese arts in general, the history of Japanese painting is a long history of synthesis and competition between native Japanese aesthetics and adaptation of imported ideas.

The origins of painting in Japan date well back into Japan's prehistoric period. Simple stick figures and geometric designs can be found on Jōmon period pottery and Yayoi period (300 BC – 300 AD) dōtaku bronze bells. Mural paintings with both geometric and figurative designs have been found in numerous tumulus from the Kofun period (300–700 AD).

Ancient Japanese sculpture was mostly derived from the idol worship in Buddhism or animistic rites of Shinto deity. In particular, sculpture among all the arts came to be most firmly centered around Buddhism. Materials traditionally used were metal—especially bronze—and, more commonly, wood, often lacquered, gilded, or brightly painted. By the end of the Tokugawa period, such traditional sculpture – except for miniaturized works – had largely disappeared because of the loss of patronage by Buddhist temples and the nobility.

Ukiyo, meaning "floating world", refers to the impetuous young culture that bloomed in the urban centers of Edo (modern-day Tokyo), Osaka, and Kyoto that were a world unto themselves. It is an ironic allusion to the homophone term "Sorrowful World" (憂き世), the earthly plane of death and rebirth from which Buddhists sought release.

=== Korean art ===
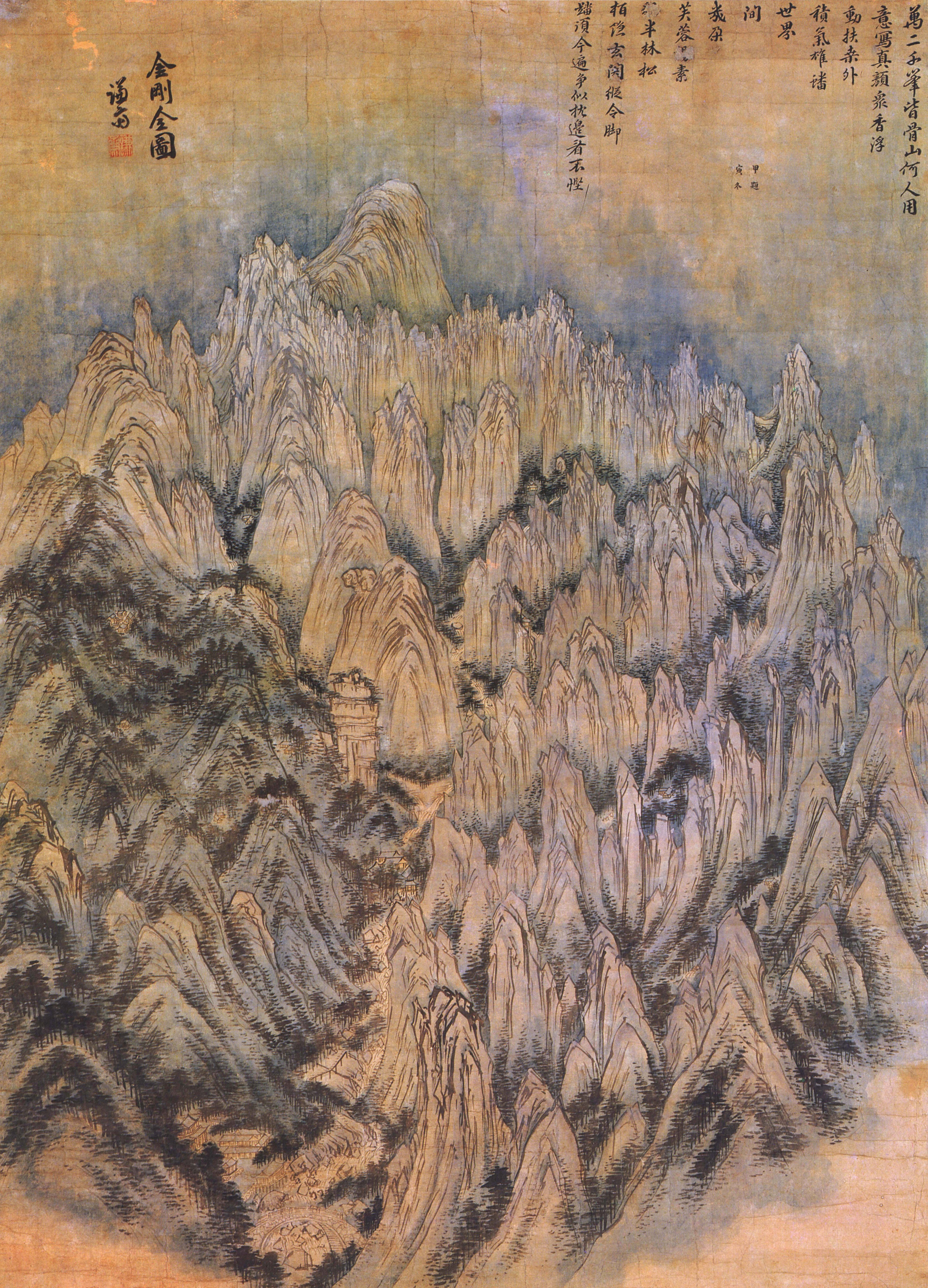
Jeong Seon, General View of Mt. Geumgang (금강전도, 金剛全圖), Korea, c.1734

Korean art is noted for its traditions in pottery, music, calligraphy, painting, sculpture, and other genres, often marked by the use of bold color, natural forms, precise shape and scale, and surface decoration.

While there are clear and distinguishing differences between three independent cultures, there are significant and historical similarities and interactions between the arts of Korea, China, and Japan.

The study and appreciation of Korean art is still at a formative stage in the West. Because of Korea's position between China and Japan, Korea was seen as a mere conduit of Chinese culture to Japan. However, recent scholars have begun to acknowledge Korea's own unique art, culture, and important role in not only transmitting Chinese culture but assimilating it and creating a unique culture of its own. An art given birth to and developed by a nation is its own art.

Generally, the history of Korean painting is dated to approximately 108 C.E., when it first appears as an independent form. Between that time and the paintings and frescoes that appear on the Goryeo dynasty tombs, there has been little research. Suffice to say that until the Joseon dynasty the primary influence was Chinese painting though done with Korean landscapes, facial features, Buddhist topics, and an emphasis on celestial observation in keeping with the rapid development of Korean astronomy.

Throughout the history of Korean painting, there has been a constant separation of monochromatic works of black brushwork on very often mulberry paper or silk; and the colourful folk art or min-hwa, ritual arts, tomb paintings, and festival arts which made extensive use of colour.

This distinction was often class-based: scholars, particularly in Confucian art, felt that one could see colour in monochromatic paintings within the gradations and felt that the actual use of colour coarsened the paintings, and restricted the imagination. Korean folk art, and painting of architectural frames was seen as brightening certain outside wood frames, and again within the tradition of Chinese architecture, and the early Buddhist influences of profuse rich thalo and primary colours inspired by the Art of India.

Contemporary art in Korea: The first example of Western-style oil painting in Korean art was in the self-portraits of Korean artist Ko Hu i-dong (1886–1965). Only three of these works still remain today. These self-portraits impart an understanding of the medium that extends well beyond the affirmation of stylistic and cultural difference. By the early twentieth century, the decision to paint using oil and canvas in Korea had two different interpretations. One being a sense of enlightenment due to western ideas and art styles. This enlightenment derived from an intellectual movement of the seventeenth and eighteenth centuries. Ko had been painting with this method during a period of Japan's annexation of Korea. During this time many claimed his art could have been political, however, he himself stated he was an artist and not a politician. Ko stated: "While I was in Tokyo, a very curious thing happened. At that time there were fewer than one hundred Korean students in Tokyo. All of us were drinking the new air and embarking on new studies, but there were some who mocked my choice to study art. A close friend said that it was not right for me to study painting in such a time as this."

Korean pottery was recognized as early as 6000 BCE. This pottery was also referred to as comb-patterned pottery due to the decorative lines carved onto the outside. Early Korean societies were mainly dependent on fishing. So, they used pottery to store fish and other things collected from the ocean such as shellfish. Pottery had two main regional distinctions. Those from the East coast tend to have a flat base, whereas pottery on the South coast had a round base.

== Southeast Asian art ==
=== Bruneian art ===
Silver is a popular element in Bruneian art. Silversmiths make ornaments, flower vases and gongs (metal disk with a turned rim giving a resonant note when stuck). Another popular utensil is pasigupan, a type of mini pot that has a mandala print and holds tobacco.

Weaving skills have been passed across generations. Brunei produces fabric for making gowns and sarongs. "The weaving and decoration of cloth as well as wearing, display, and exchange of it, has been an important part of Bruneian culture for years (Orr 96)." Weaving became significant in the 15th century. Antonio Pigafetta visited Brunei during his travels and observed how the clothes were made. One example was a Jongsarat, a handmade garment used for weddings and special occasions. It typically includes a hint of silver and gold. It can be used for wall coverings.

The two types of clothing in Brunei are called Batik and Ikat. Batik is dyed cotton cloth decorated through a technique known as wax-resist dyeing. Ikat is made through a similar process as Batik, Instead of dyeing the pattern onto finished cloth, it is created during weaving.

=== Cambodian art ===
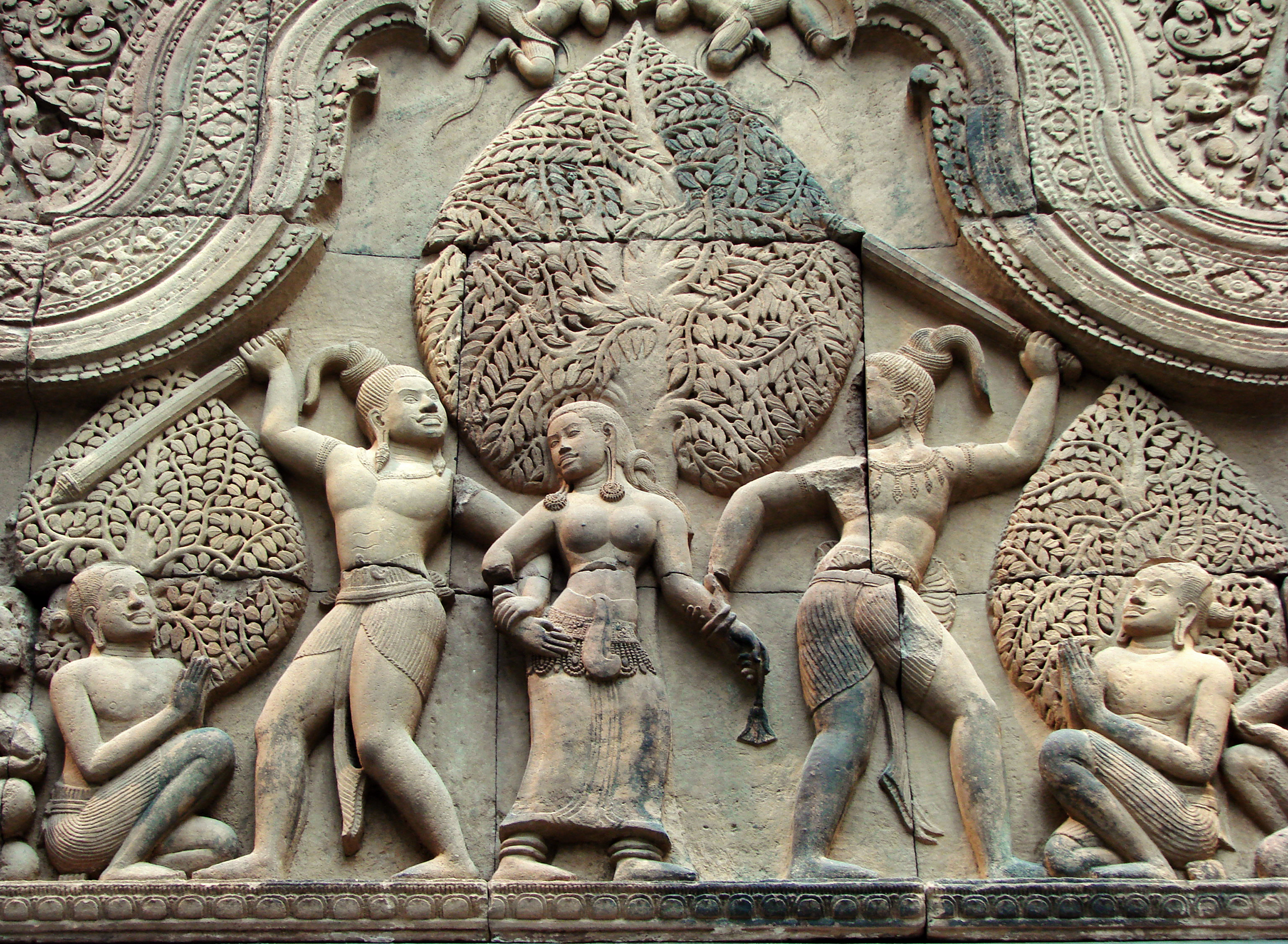
Stone carving at Banteay Srei (Angkor)

Cambodian art and the culture of Cambodia has had a rich and varied history dating back many centuries and has been heavily influenced by India. In turn, Cambodia greatly influenced Thailand, Laos, and vice versa. Throughout Cambodia's long history, a major source of inspiration was from religion. Throughout nearly two millennia, Cambodians developed a unique Khmer belief from the syncreticism of indigenous animistic beliefs and the Indian religions of Buddhism and Hinduism. Indian culture and civilization, including its language and arts, reached mainland Southeast Asia around the 1st century CE. It is generally believed that seafaring merchants brought Indian customs and culture to ports along the gulf of Thailand and the Pacific while trading with China. The first state to benefit from this was Funan. At various times, Cambodian culture also absorbed elements from Javanese, Chinese, Lao, and Thai cultures.

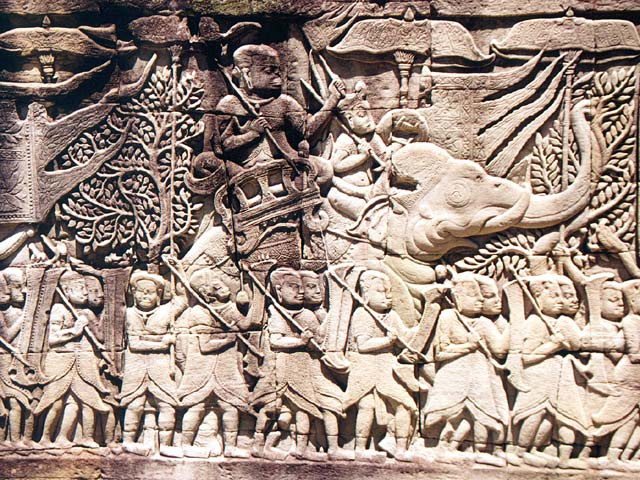
Stone bas-relief at Bayon temple depicting the Khmer army at war with the Cham, carved c. 1200 CE

The history of the visual arts of Cambodia stretches back centuries to ancient crafts; Khmer art reached its peak during the Angkor period. Traditional Cambodian arts and crafts include textiles, non-textile weaving, silversmithing, stone carving, lacquerware, ceramics, wat murals, and kite-making. Beginning in the mid-20th century, a tradition of modern art began in Cambodia, though in the later 20th century both traditional and modern arts declined for several reasons, including the killing of artists by the Khmer Rouge. The country has experienced a recent artistic revival due to increased support from governments, NGOs, and foreign tourists.

==== Khmer sculpture ====
Khmer sculpture refers to the stone sculpture of the Khmer Empire, which ruled a territory based on modern Cambodia, but rather larger, from the 9th to the 13th century. The most celebrated examples are found in Angkor, which served as the seat of the empire.

By the 7th century, Khmer sculpture began to diverge from its Indian influences – pre-Gupta for the Buddhist figures, Pallava for the Hindu figures – and through constant stylistic evolution, developed its own originality, which by the 10th century can be considered to have reached full maturity. Khmer sculpture soon went beyond religious representation, often serving to portray court figures in the guise of gods and goddesses. Furthermore, it came to constitute a means and end in itself for the execution of stylistic refinement, serving as a kind of testing ground. While the social context of the Khmer kingdom provides a second key to understanding this art, one can also imagine that on a more exclusive level, small groups of intellectuals and artists were at work, competing among themselves in mastery and refinement as they pursued an ideal of style.

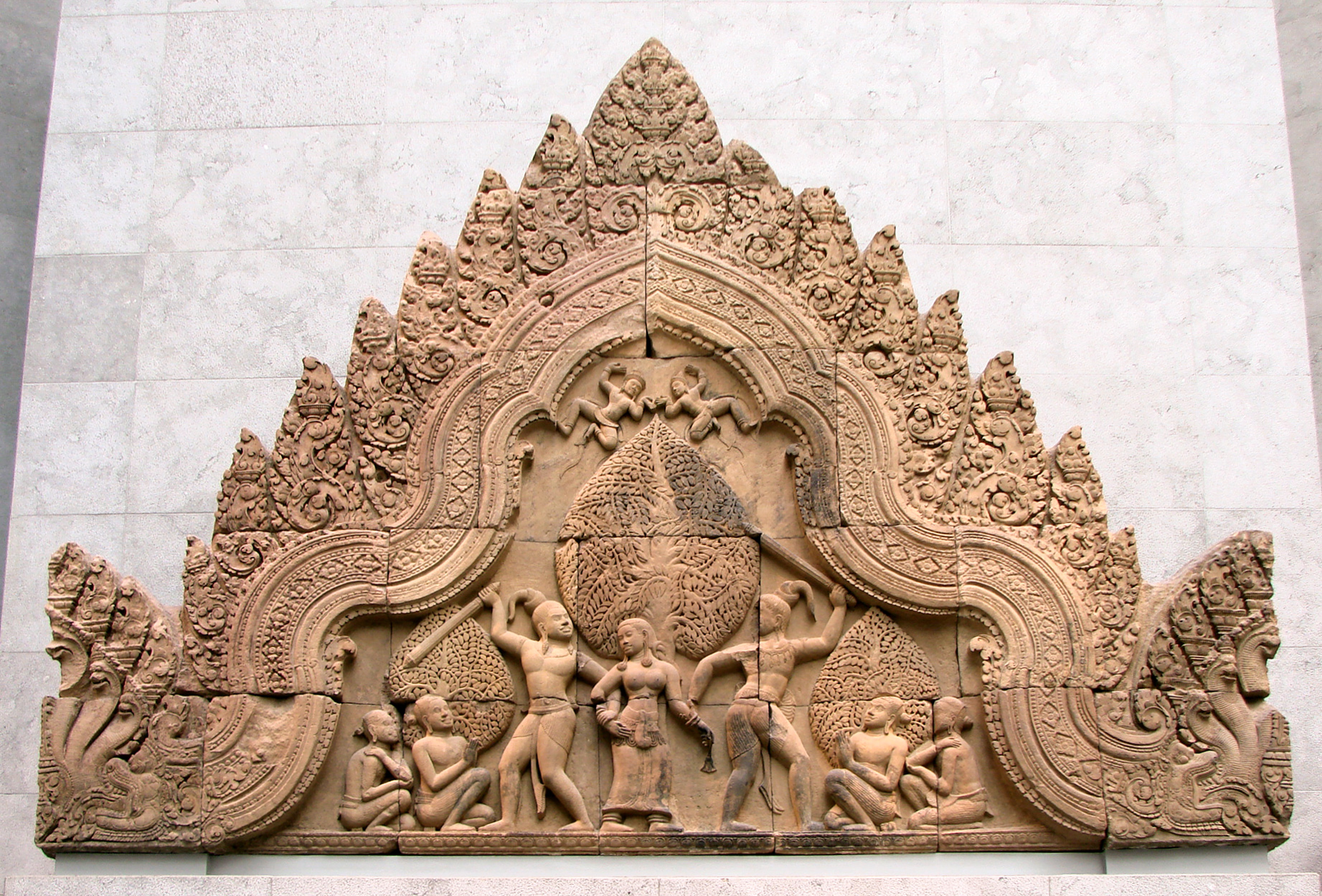
Relief from Angkor

The gods found in Khmer sculpture are those of two renowned religions in India, Buddhism and Hinduism. They are represented with iconographic precision, indicating that learned priests had supervised the execution of the works. However, as opposed to the Hindu representations that reiterate an idealized stereotype, these images are considered to be rendered with realism and originality, as they portray real-life subjects: the king and his court. The true social function of Khmer art was, in fact, the glorification of the aristocracy through these images of the gods embodied in the princes. In fact, the cult of the "deva-raja" required the development of an eminently aristocratic art in which the people were supposed to see the tangible proof of the sovereign's divinity, while the aristocracy took pleasure in seeing itself – if, it's true, in idealized form – immortalized in the splendour of intricate adornments, elegant dresses, and extravagant jewelry.

The sculptures are images of gods, royal and imposing presences, though not without feminine sensuality, which would invoke thoughts of important persons at the courts and persons of considerable power. The artists who sculpted the stones were agreed to have satisfied the primary objectives and requisites demanded by the persons who commissioned them. The sculptures represent the chosen divinity in the orthodox manner and are seen to succeed in portraying, with great skill and expertise, high figures of the courts in the attire, adornments, and jewelry of a sophisticated beauty.

=== Filipino art ===
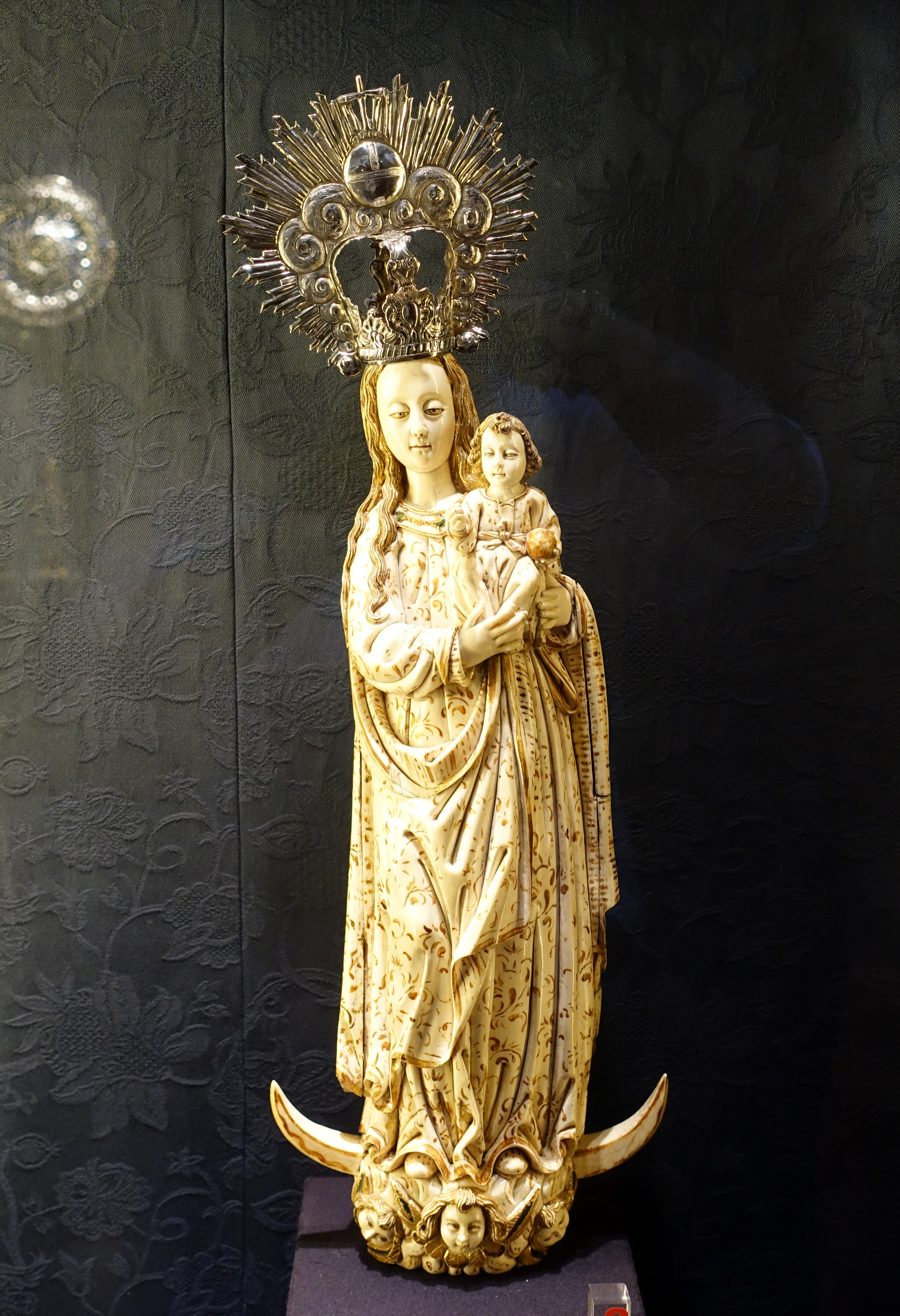
Madonna with Child ivory statue.

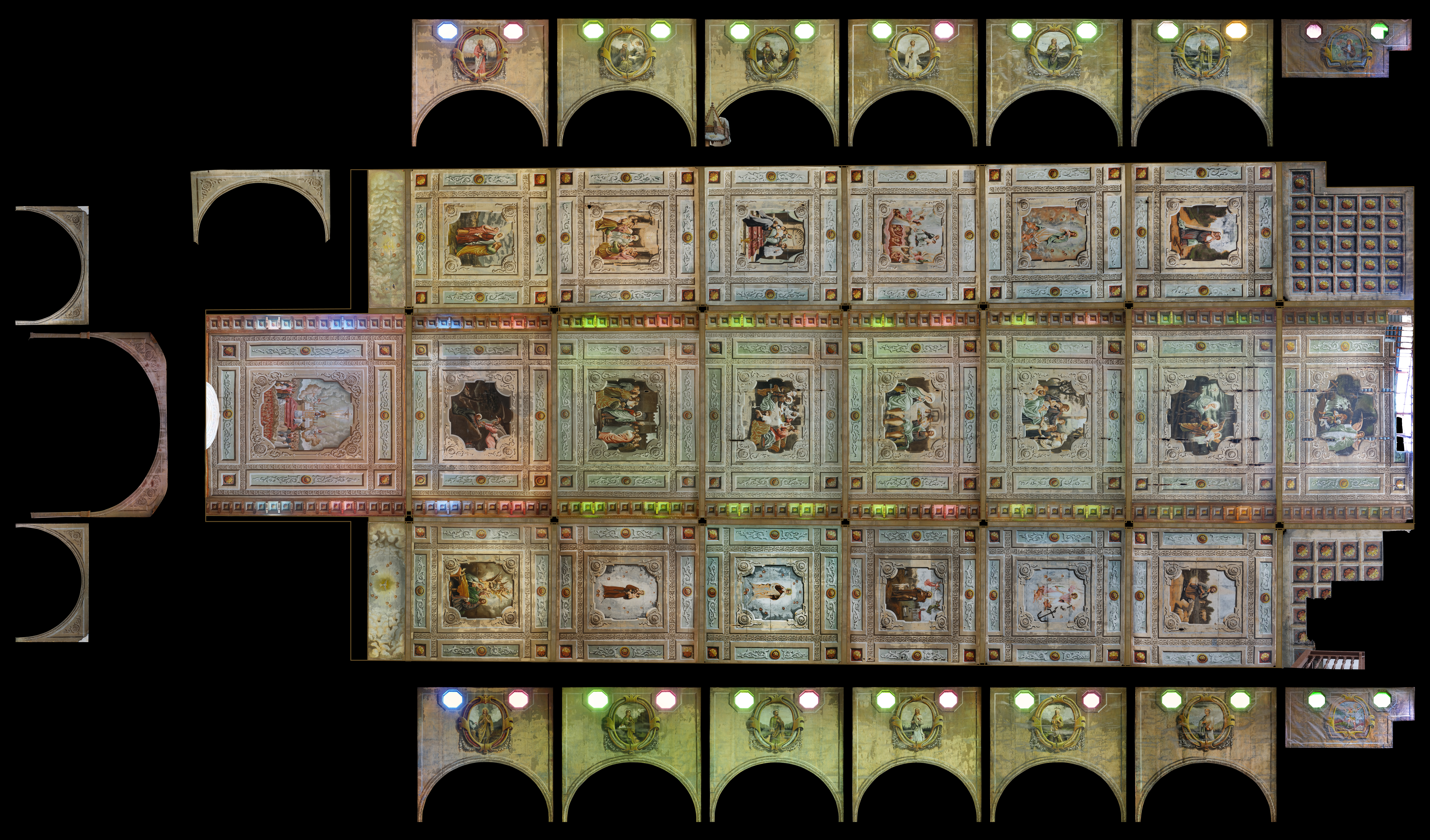
Lila Church ceiling paintings.

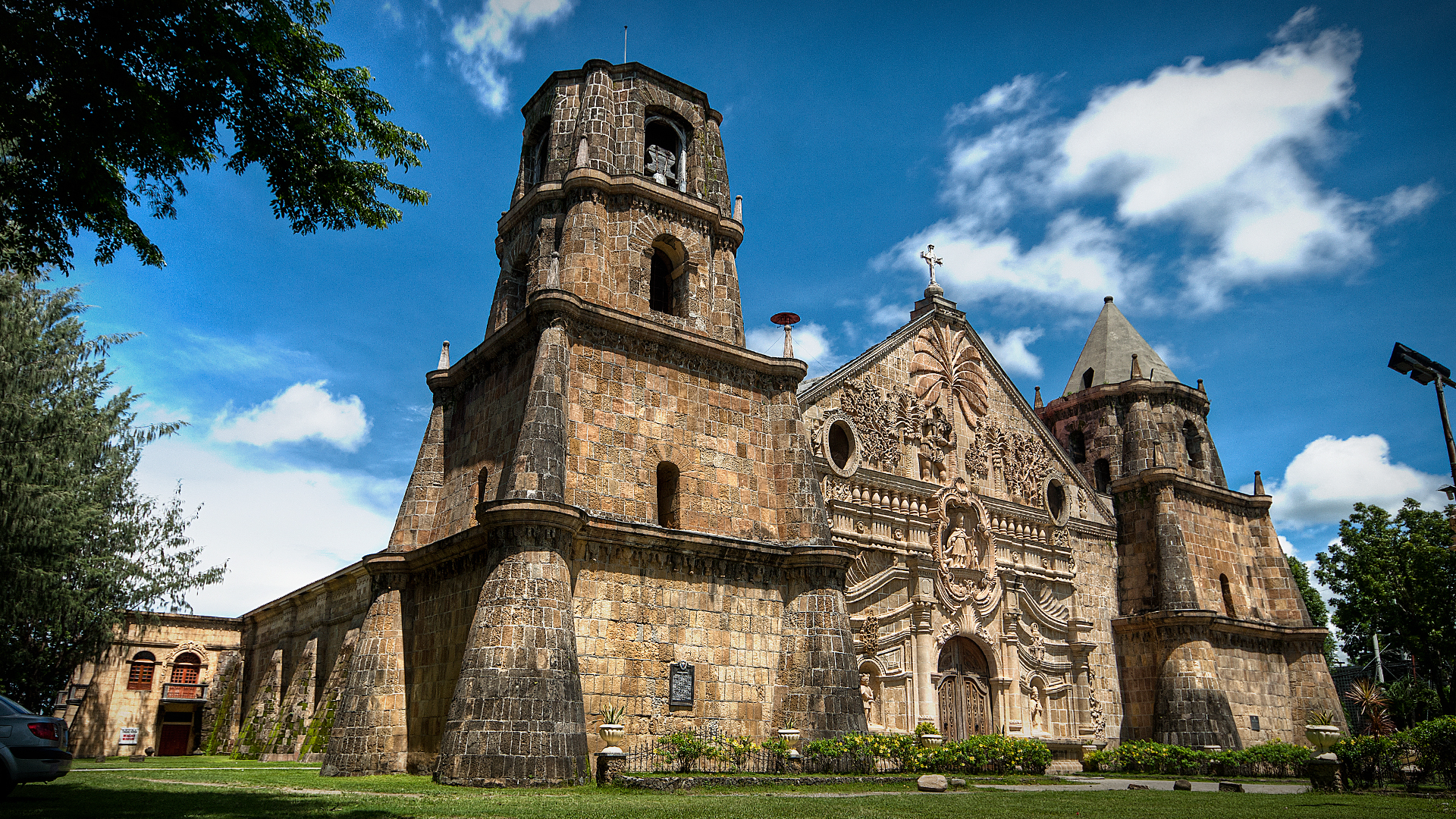
Miagao Church.

The earliest known Filipino arts are the rock arts, where the oldest is the Angono Petroglyphs, made during the Neolithic age, dated between 6000 and 2000 BC. The carvings were possibly used as part of an ancient healing practice for sick children. This was followed by the Alab Petroglyphs, dated not later than 1500 BC, which exhibited symbols of fertility such as a pudenda. The rock arts are petrographs, including the charcoal rock art from Peñablanca, charcoal rock art from Singnapan, red hematite art at Anda, and the recently discovered rock art from Monreal (Ticao), depicting monkeys, human faces, worms or snakes, plants, dragonflies, and birds. Between 890 and 710 BC, the Manunggul Jar was made in southern Palawan. It served as a secondary burial jar, where the top cover depicts the journey of the soul into the afterlife through a boat with a psychopomp. In 100 BC, the Kabayan Mummy Burial Caves were carved from a mountain. Between 5 BC-225 AD, the Maitum anthropomorphic pottery were created in Cotabato. The crafts were secondary burial jars, with many depicting human heads, hands, feet, and breast.

By the 4th century AD, and most likely before that, ancient people from the Philippines have been making giant warships, where the earliest known archaeological evidences have been excavated from Butuan, where the ship was identified as a balangay and dated at 320 AD. The oldest, currently found, artifact with a written script on it is the Laguna Copperplate Inscription, dated 900 AD. The plate discusses the payment of a debt. The Butuan Ivory Seal is the earliest known ivory art in the country, dated between the 9th to 12th century AD. The seal contains carvings of an ancient script. During this period, various artifacts were made, such as the Agusan image, a gold statue of a deity, possibly influenced by Hinduism and Buddhism. From the 12th to 15th century, the Butuan Silver Paleograph was made. The script on the silver has yet to be deciphered. Between the 13th–14th century, the natives of Banton, Romblon, crafted the Banton cloth, the oldest surviving ikat textile in Southeast Asia. The cloth was used as a death blanket. By the 16th century, up to the late 19th century, Spanish colonization influenced various forms of art in the country.

From 1565 to 1815, Filipino craftsfolk were making the Manila galleons used for the trading from Asia to the Americas, where many of the goods went to Europe. In 1565, the ancient tradition of tattooing in the Philippines was first recorded through the Pintados. In 1584, Fort San Antonio Abad was completed, while in 1591, Fort Santiago was built. By 1600, the Rice Terraces of the Philippine Cordilleras were made. Five rice terrace clusters have been designated as World Heritage Sites. In 1607, the San Agustin Church (Manila) was built. The building has been declared as a World Heritage Site. The site is famous for its painted interior. In 1613, the oldest surviving suyat writing on paper was written through the University of Santo Tomas Baybayin Documents. Following 1621, the Monreal Stones were created in Ticao, Masbate. In 1680, the Arch of the Centuries was made. In 1692, the image of Nuestra Senora de la Soledad de Porta Vaga was painted.

Manaoag Church was established in 1701. In 1710, the World Heritage Site of Paoay Church was built. The church is known for its giant buttresses, part of the earthquake Baroque architecture. In 1720, the religious paintings at Camarin de la Virgen in Santa Ana were made. In 1725, the historical Santa Ana Church was built. In 1765, the World Heritage Site of Santa Maria Church was built. The site is notable for its highland structure. Bacarra Church was built in 1782. In 1783, the idjangs, castle-fortresses, of Batanes were first recorded. The exact age of the structures are still unknown. In 1797, the World Heritage Site of Miagao Church was built. The church is famous for its facade carvings. Tayum Church was built in 1803. In 1807, the Basi Revolt paintings were made, depicting the Ilocano revolution against Spanish interference on basi production and consumption. In 1822, the historical Paco Park was established. In 1824, the Las Piñas Bamboo Organ was created, becoming the first and only organ made of bamboo. By 1852, the Sacred Art paintings of the Parish Church of Santiago Apostol were finished. In 1884, both the Assassination of Governor Bustamante and His Son and Spoliarium won prizes during an art competition in Spain. In 1890, the painting, Feeding the Chicken, was made. The Parisian Life was painted in 1892, while La Bulaqueña was painted in 1895. The clay art, The Triumph of Science over Death, was crafted in 1890. In 1891, the first and only all-steel church in Asia, San Sebastian Church (Manila), was built. In 1894, the clay art Mother's Revenge was made.

In the 20th century, or possibly earlier, the Koran of Bayang was written. During the same time, the Stone Agricultural Calendar of Guiday, Besao, was discovered by outsiders. In 1913, the Rizal Monument was completed. In 1927, the University of Santo Tomas Main Building was rebuilt, while its Central Seminary Building was built in 1933. In 1931, the royal palace Darul Jambangan of Sulu was destroyed. On the same year, the Manila Metropolitan Theater was built. The Progress of Medicine in the Philippines paintings were finished in 1953. Santo Domingo Church was built in 1954. In 1962, the International Rice Research Institute painting was completed, while the Manila Mural was made in 1968. In 1993, the Bonifacio Monument was created.

=== Indonesian art ===
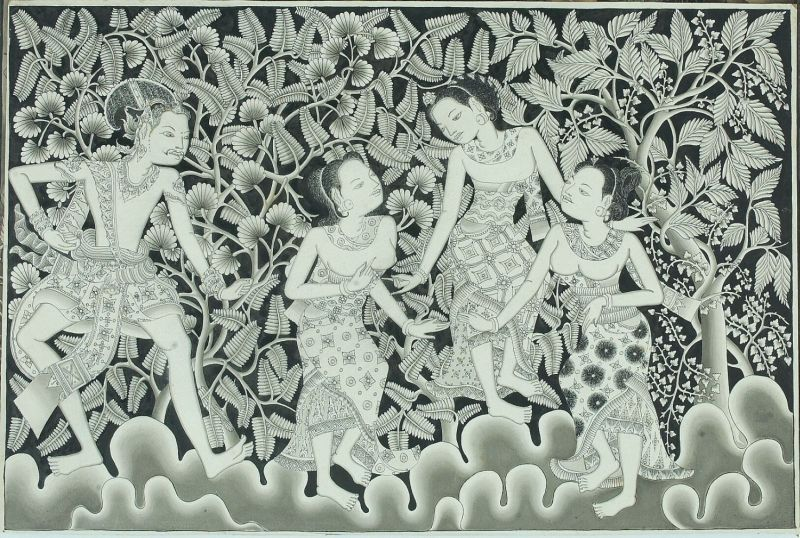
Balinese painting of Prince Panji meeting three women in the jungle

Indonesian art and culture has been shaped by long interaction between original indigenous customs and multiple foreign influences. Indonesia is central along ancient trading routes between the Far East and the Middle East, resulting in many cultural practices being strongly influenced by a multitude of religions, including Hinduism, Buddhism, Confucianism, and Islam, all strong in the major trading cities. The result is a complex cultural mixture very different from the original indigenous cultures. Indonesia is not generally known for paintings, aside from the intricate and expressive Balinese paintings, which often express natural scenes and themes from the traditional dances.

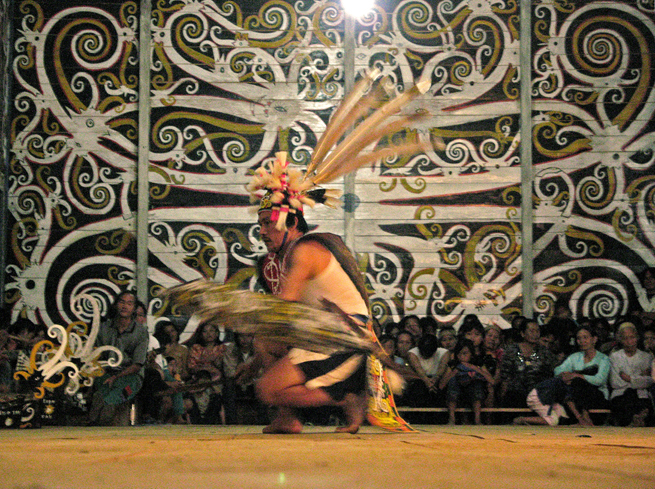
Kenyah mural painting in Long Nawang, East Kalimantan.

Other exceptions include indigenous Kenyah paint designs based on, as commonly found among Austronesian cultures, endemic natural motifs such as ferns, trees, dogs, hornbills, and human figures. These are still to be found decorating the walls of Kenyah Dayak longhouses in East Kalimantan's Apo Kayan region.

Indonesia has a long-he Bronze and Iron Ages, but the art-form particularly flourished from the 8th century to the 10th century, both as standalone works of art, and also incorporated into temples.

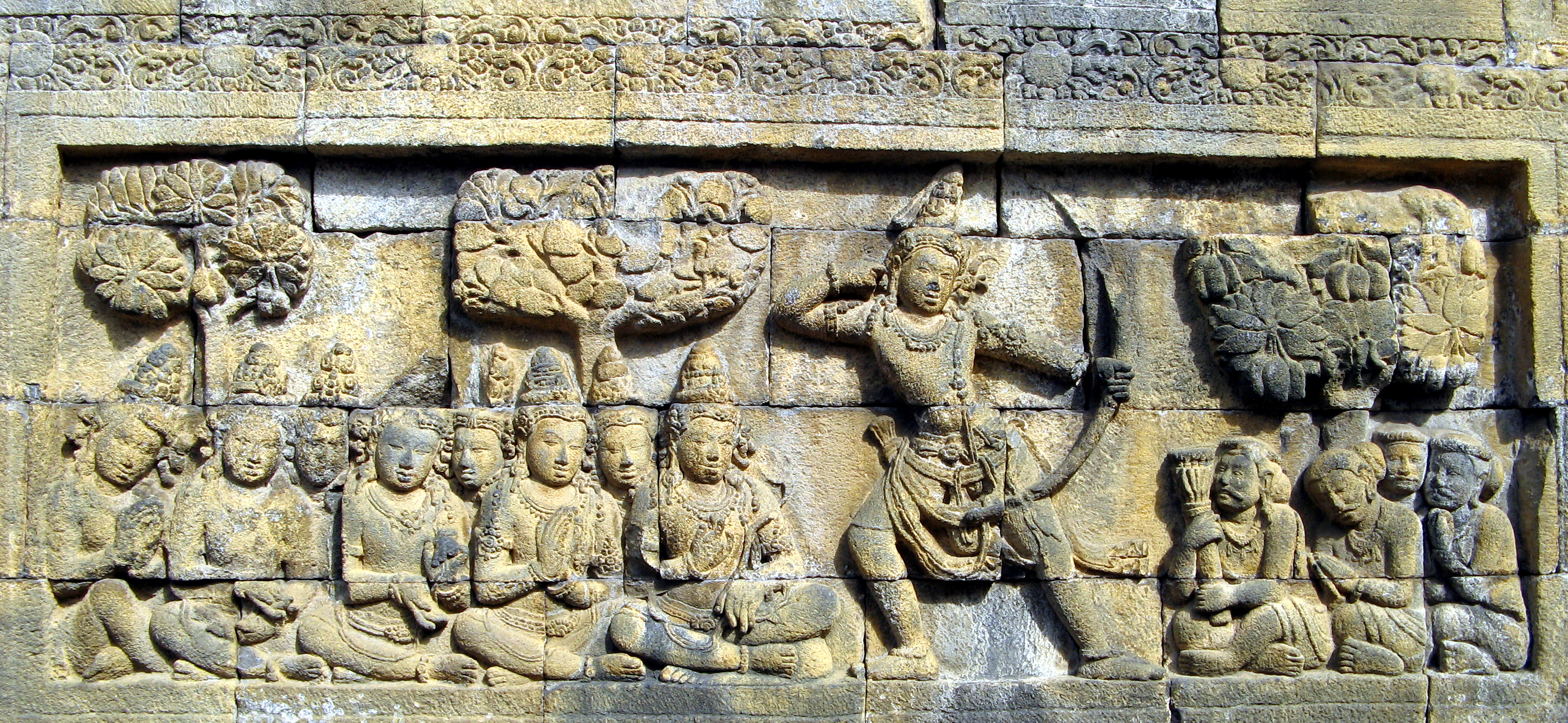
Relief sculpture from Borobudur temple, c. 760–830 AD

Most notable are the hundreds of meters of relief sculptures at the temple of Borobudur in central Java. Approximately two miles of exquisite relief sculptures tell the story of the life of Buddha and illustrate his teachings. The temple was originally home to 504 statues of the seated Buddha. This site, as with others in central Java, show a clear Indian influence.

Calligraphy, mostly based on the Qur'an, is often used as decoration as Islam forbids naturalistic depictions. Some foreign painters have also settled in Indonesia. Modern Indonesian painters use a wide variety of styles and themes.

==== Balinese art ====
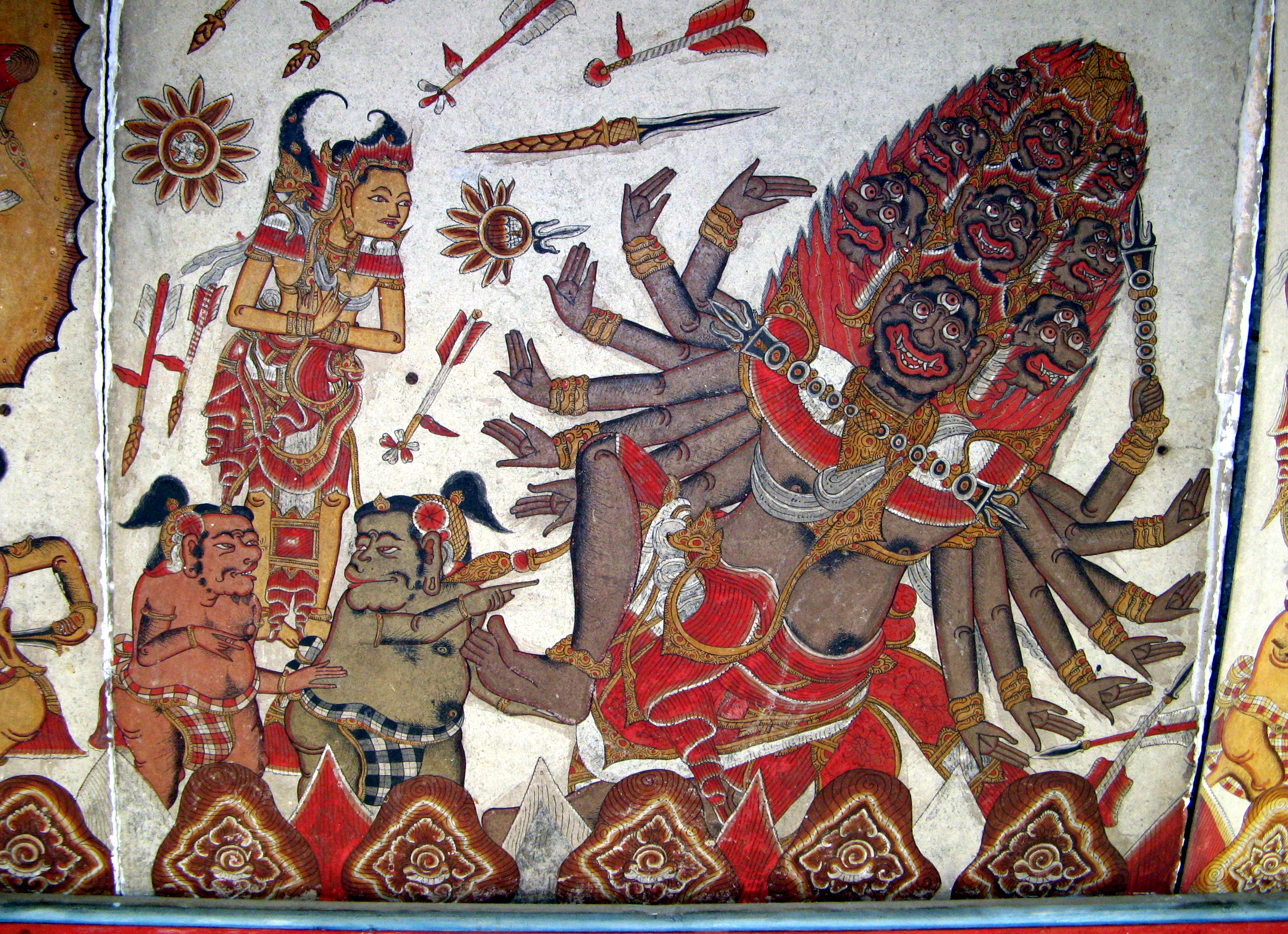
Balinese painting of Ramayana scene from Kerta Gosha, depicting Rama versus Dasamukha (Ravana).

Balinese art is art of Hindu-Javanese origin that grew from the work of artisans of the Majapahit Kingdom, with their expansion to Bali in the late 13th century. From the 16th until the 20th centuries, the village of Kamasan, Klungkung (East Bali), was the centre of classical Balinese art. During the first part of the 20th century, new varieties of Balinese art developed. Since the late twentieth century, Ubud and its neighboring villages established a reputation as the center of Balinese art. Ubud and Batuan are known for their paintings, Mas for their woodcarvings, Celuk for gold and silversmiths, and Batubulan for their stone carvings. Covarrubias describes Balinese art as, "... a highly developed, although informal Baroque folk art that combines the peasant liveliness with the refinement of classicism of Hinduistic Java, but free of the conservative prejudice and with a new vitality fired by the exuberance of the demonic spirit of the tropical primitive". Eiseman pointed out that Balinese art is actually carved, painted, woven, and prepared into objects intended for everyday use rather than as object d 'art.

In the 1920s, with the arrival of many western artists, Bali became an artist enclave (as Tahiti was for Paul Gauguin) for avant-garde artists such as Walter Spies (German), Rudolf Bonnet (Dutch), Adrien-Jean Le Mayeur (Belgian), Arie Smit (Dutch), and Donald Friend (Australian) in more recent years. Most of these western artists had very little influence on the Balinese until the post-World War Two period, although some accounts over-emphasise the western presence at the expense of recognising Balinese creativity.

This groundbreaking period of creativity reached a peak in the late 1930s. A stream of famous visitors, including Charlie Chaplin and the anthropologists Gregory Bateson and Margaret Mead, encouraged the talented locals to create highly original works. During their stay in Bali in the mid-1930s, Bateson and Mead collected over 2000 paintings, predominantly from the village of Batuan, but also from the coastal village of Sanur. Among western artists, Spies and Bonnet are often credited for the modernization of traditional Balinese paintings. From the 1950s onwards, Baliese artists incorporated aspects of perspective and anatomy from these artists. More importantly, they acted as agents of change by encouraging experimentation, and promoted departures from tradition. The result was an explosion of individual expression that increased the rate of change in Balinese art.

=== Lao art ===
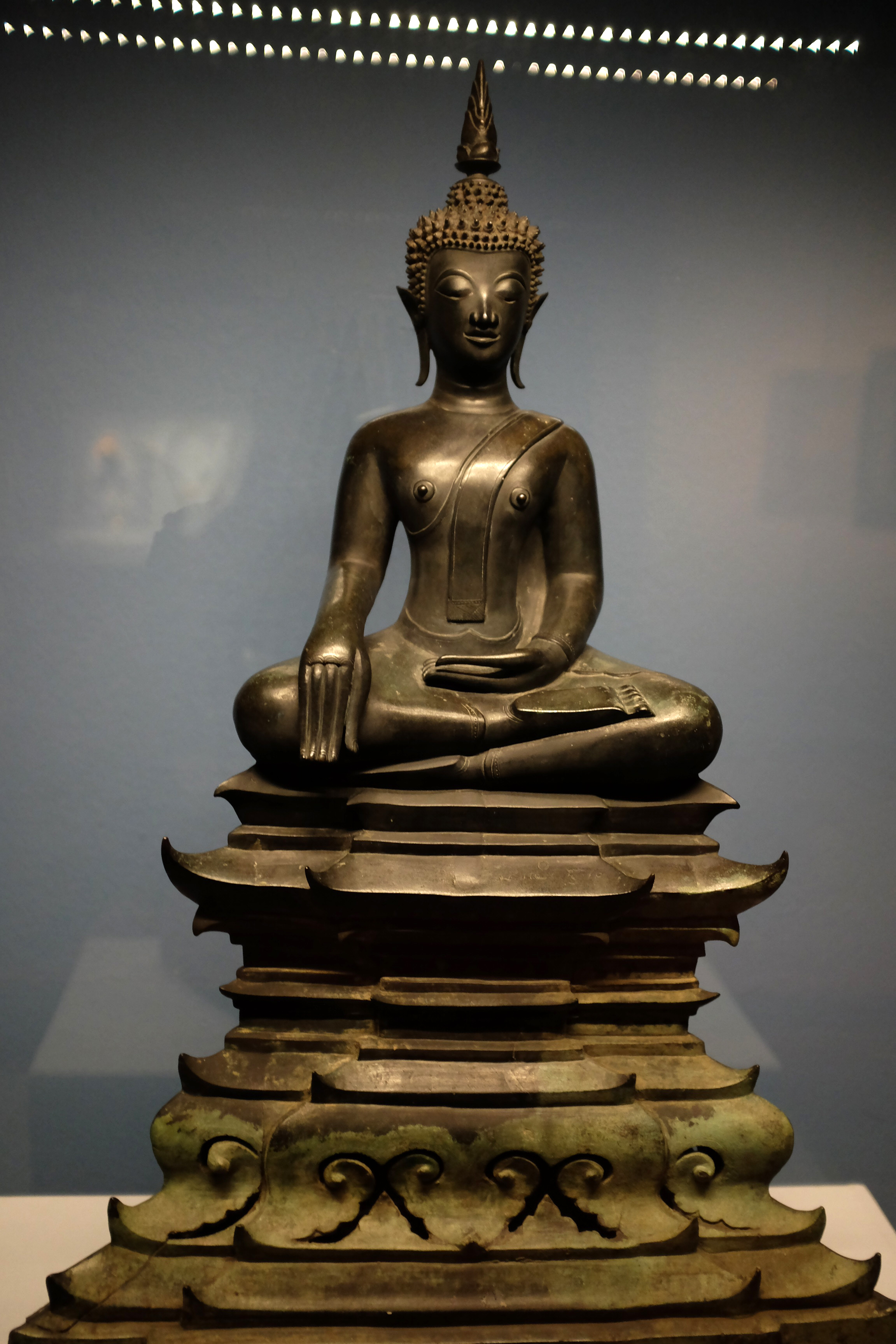
Lan Xang bronze Buddha, 17th century Laos

Laotian art includes ceramics, Lao Buddhist sculpture, and Lao music.

Lao Buddhist sculptures were created in a large variety of material including gold, silver, and, most often, bronze. Brick-and-mortar was also a medium used for colossal images, most famous of these is the image of Phya Vat (16th century) in Vientiane, although a renovation completely altered the appearance of the sculpture, and it no longer resembles a Lao Buddha. Wood is popular for small, votive Buddhist images that are often left in caves. Wood is also very common for large, life-size standing images of the Buddha. The most famous two sculptures carved in semi-precious stone are the Phra Keo (The Emerald Buddha) and the Phra Phuttha Butsavarat. The Phra Keo, which is probably of Xieng Sen (Chiang Saen) origin, is carved from a solid block of jade. It rested in Vientiane for two hundred years before the Siamese carried it away as booty in the late 18th century. Today it serves as the palladium of the Kingdom of Thailand, and resides at the Grand Palace in Bangkok. The Phra Phuttha Butsavarat, like the Phra Keo, is also enshrined in its own chapel at the Grand Palace in Bangkok. Before the Siamese seized it in the early 19th century, this crystal image was the palladium of the Lao kingdom of Champassack.

Many Lao Buddhist sculptures are carved right into the Pak Ou caves. The Tham Ting (lower cave) and the Tham Theung (upper cave) are located on Pak Ou (mouth of the Ou river) near Luang Prabang, Laos. They are a group of caves only accessible by boat, about two hours upstream from the center of Luang Prabang, and have recently become more well-known and frequented by tourists. The caves are noted for their Buddhist and Lao style sculptures carved into the cave walls, and hundreds of discarded Buddhist figures laid out over the floors and wall shelves. These discarded statues were left by their owners who did not wish to destroy them.

=== Malaysian art ===
Malaysian art is primarily composed of Malay art and Bornean art, holding similarities with the other styles from Southeast Asia, such that of Brunei, Indonesia, and Singapore. The history of art in Malaysia dates back to the Malay sultanates, with influences from Chinese, Indian and Islamic arts.

Traditional Malaysian art is mainly centred on the crafts of carving, weaving, and silversmithing. Traditional art ranges from handwoven baskets from rural areas to the silverwork of the Malay courts. Common artworks included ornamental kris and beetle nut sets. Luxurious textiles known as Songket are made, as well as traditional patterned batik fabrics. Indigenous East Malaysians are known for their wooden masks. Malaysian art has expanded only recently, as before the 1950s Islamic taboos about drawing people and animals were strong. Textiles such as the batik, songket, Pua Kumbu, and tekat are used for decorations, often embroidered with a painting or pattern. Traditional jewelry was made from gold and silver adorned with gems, and, in East Malaysia, leather and beads were used to the same effect.

=== Myanmar art ===
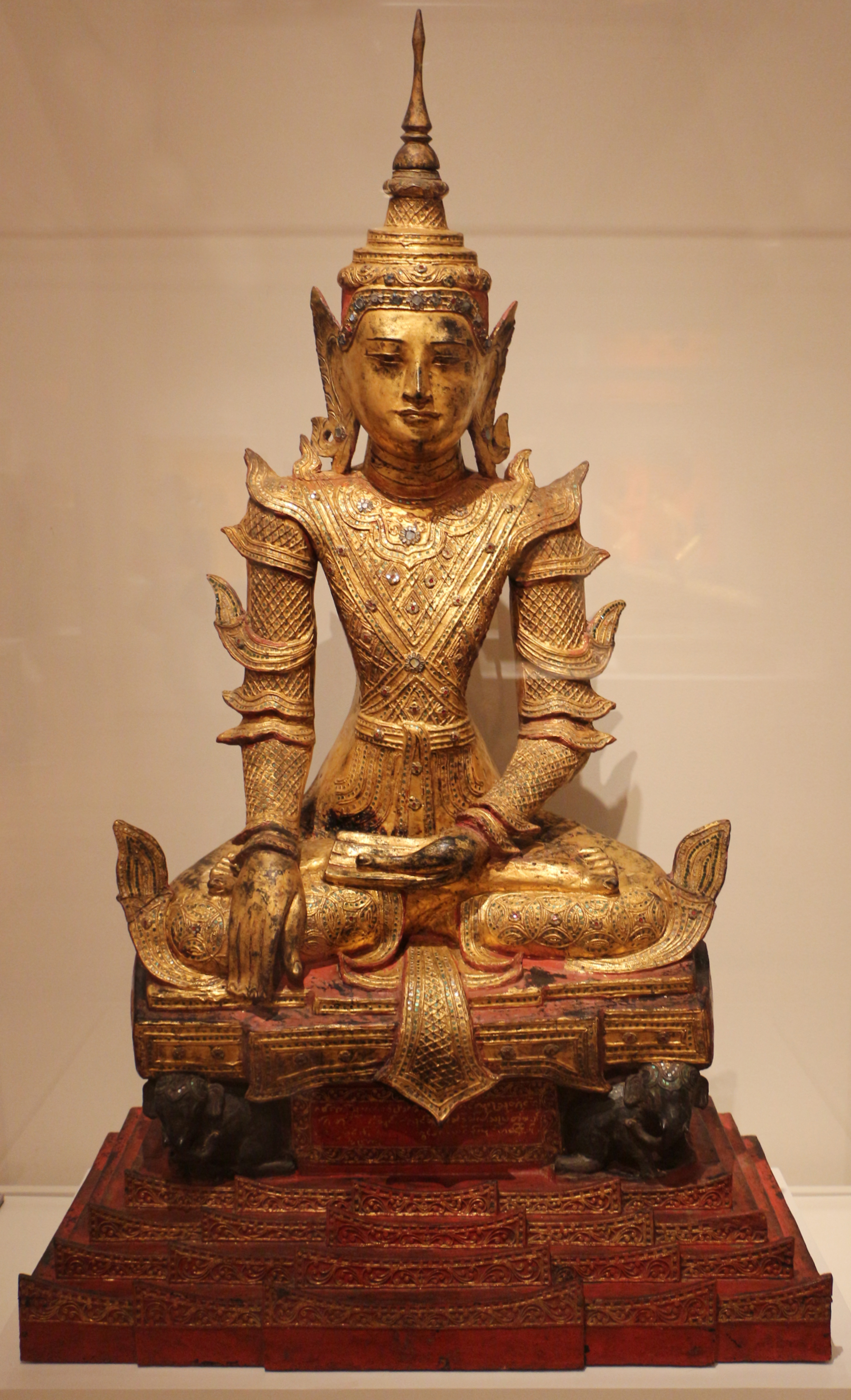
Buddha on an elephant throne; c. 1890; Art Institute of Chicago (USA)

Art of Myanmar refers to visual art created in Myanmar (Burma). Ancient Burmese art was influenced by India and was often religious in nature, ranging from Hindu sculptures in the Thaton Kingdom to Theravada Buddhist images in the Sri Ksetra Kingdom.

The Bagan period saw significant developments in many art forms from wall paintings and sculptures to stucco and wood carving. After a dearth of surviving art between the 14th and 16th century, artists created paintings and sculptures that reflect the Burmese culture. Burmese artists have been subjected to government interference and censorship, hindering the development of art in Myanmar. Burmese art reflects the central Buddhist elements including the mudra, Jataka tales, the pagoda, and Bodhisattva.

=== Singaporean art ===
The history of Singaporean art includes the indigenous artistic traditions of the Malay Archipelago and the diverse visual practices of itinerant artists and migrants from China, the Indian subcontinent, and Europe.

Singaporean art includes the sculptural, textile, and decorative art traditions of the Malay world; portraiture, landscapes, sculpture, printmaking, and natural history drawings from the country's British colonial period; along with Chinese-influenced Nanyang style paintings, social realist art, abstract art, and photography practices emerging in the post-war period. Today, it includes the contemporary art practices of post-independence Singapore, such as performance art, conceptual art, installation art, video art, sound art, and new media art. The emergence of modern Singaporean art, or more specifically, "the emergence of self-aware artistic expression" is often tied to the rise of art associations, art schools, and exhibitions in the 20th century, though this has since been expanded to include earlier forms of visual representation, such as from Singapore's historical periods.

Presently, the contemporary art of Singapore also circulates internationally through art biennales and other major international exhibitions. Contemporary art in Singapore tends to examine themes of "hyper-modernity and the built environment; alienation and changing social mores; post-colonial identities and multiculturalism." Across these tendencies, "the exploration of performance and the performative body" is a common running thread. Singapore carries a notable history of performance art, with the government historically having enacted a no-funding rule for that specific art form from 1994 to 2003, following a controversial performance artwork at the 5th Passage art space.

=== Thai art ===
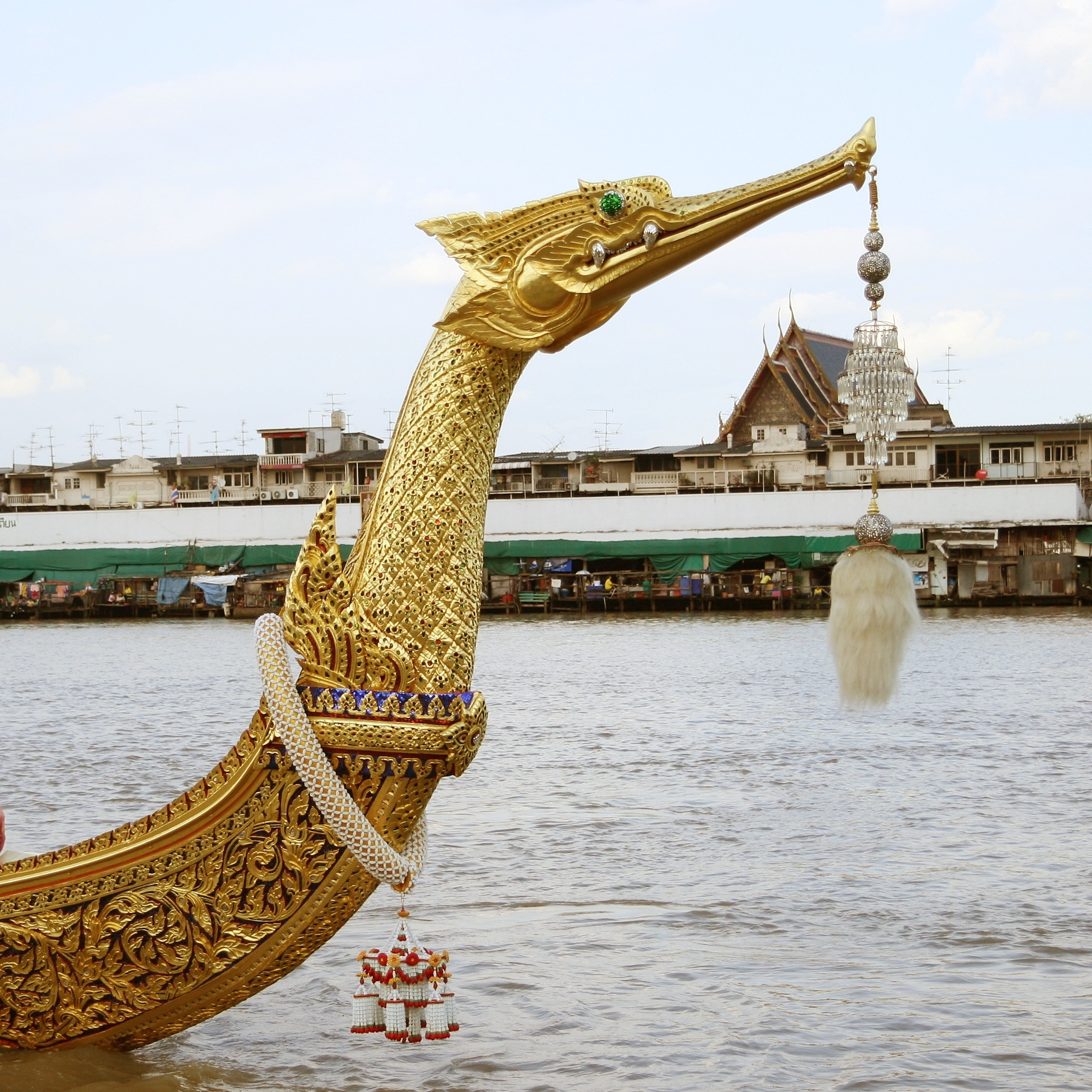
The bow of Royal Barge Suphannahong of Thailand.

Thai art and visual art was traditionally and primarily Buddhist and Royal Art. Sculpture was almost exclusively of Buddha images, while painting was confined to the illustration of books and decoration of buildings, primarily palaces and temples. Thai Buddha images from different periods have a number of distinctive styles. Contemporary Thai art often combines traditional Thai elements with modern techniques.

Traditional Thai paintings showed subjects in two dimensions without perspective. The size of each element in the picture reflected its degree of importance. The primary technique of composition is that of apportioning areas: the main elements are isolated from each other by space transformers. This eliminated the intermediate ground, which would otherwise imply perspective. Perspective was introduced only as a result of Western influence in the mid-19th century.

The most frequent narrative subjects for paintings were or are: the Jataka stories, episodes from the life of the Buddha, the Buddhist heavens and hells, and scenes of daily life.

The Sukhothai period began in the 14th century in the Sukhothai kingdom. Buddha images of the Sukhothai period are elegant, with sinuous bodies and slender, oval faces. This style emphasized the spiritual aspect of the Buddha, by omitting many small anatomical details. The effect was enhanced by the common practice of casting images in metal rather than carving them. This period saw the introduction of the "walking Buddha" pose.

Sukhothai artists tried to follow the canonical defining marks of a Buddha, as they are set out in ancient Pali texts:

- Skin so smooth that dust cannot stick to it;
- Legs like a deer;
- Thighs like a banyan tree;
- Shoulders as massive as an elephant's head;
- Arms round like an elephant's trunk, and long enough to touch the knees;
- Hands like lotuses about to bloom;
- Fingertips turned back like petals;
- Head like an egg;
- Hair like a scorpion's stingers;
- Chin like a mango stone;
- Nose like a parrot's beak;
- Earlobes lengthened by the earrings of royalty;
- Eyelashes like a cow's;
- Eyebrows like drawn bows.

Sukhothai also produced a large quantity of glazed ceramics in the Sawankhalok style, which were traded throughout Southeast Asia.

=== Timorese art ===
Art in East Timor began to popularize since the violence during the 2006 East Timorese crisis. Children living in the country began graffiting walls into peace murals.

The East Timor Arts Society promotes the art in the area, and house many different artworks produced in the country.

=== Vietnamese art ===
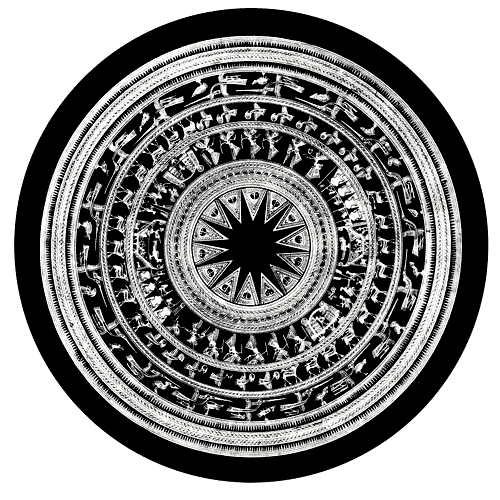
Ngoc Lu bronze drum's surface, 2nd to 3rd century BCE

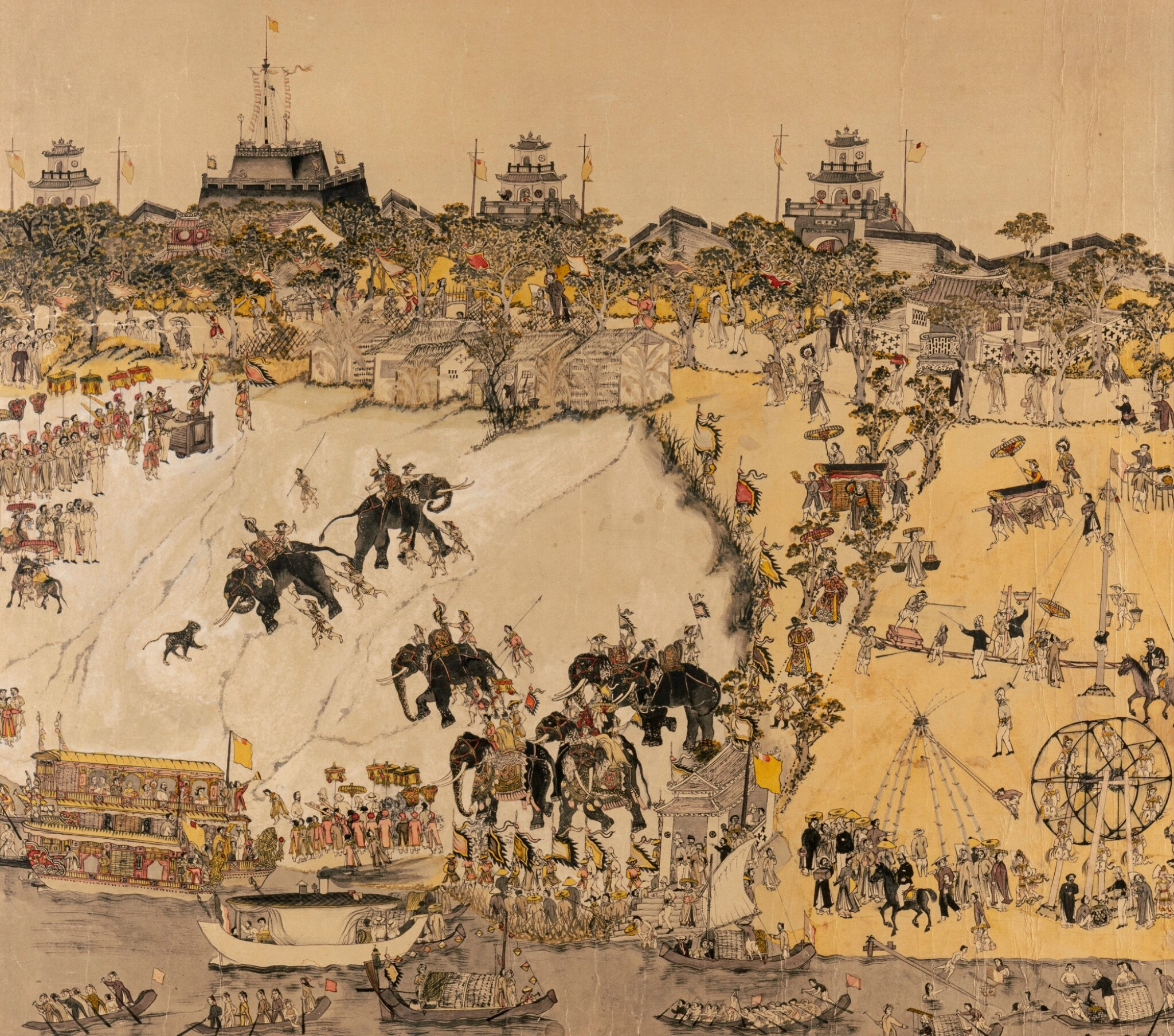
The painting depicts the festival scene in Huế

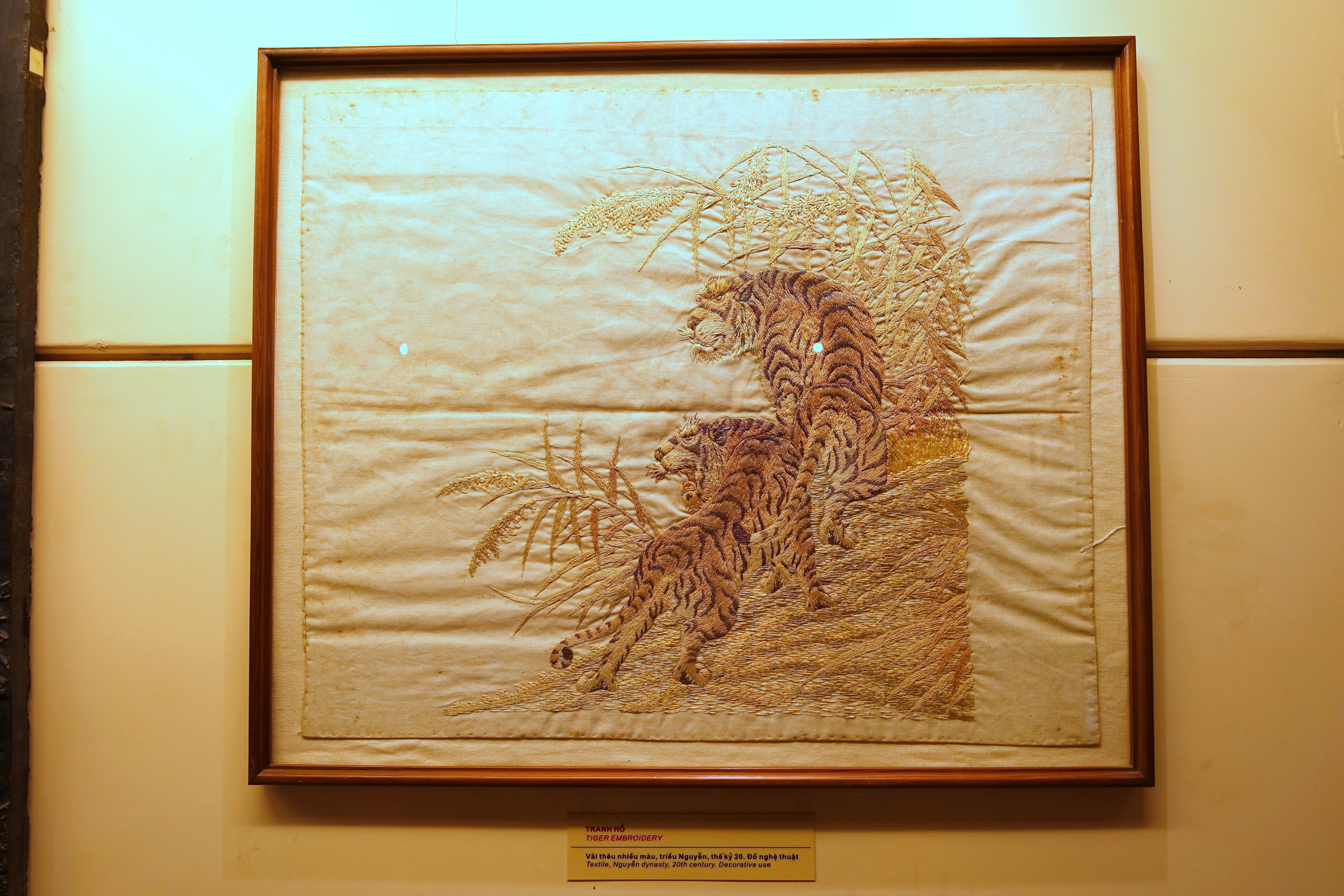
Embroidery painting of two tigers in the Nguyễn dynasty

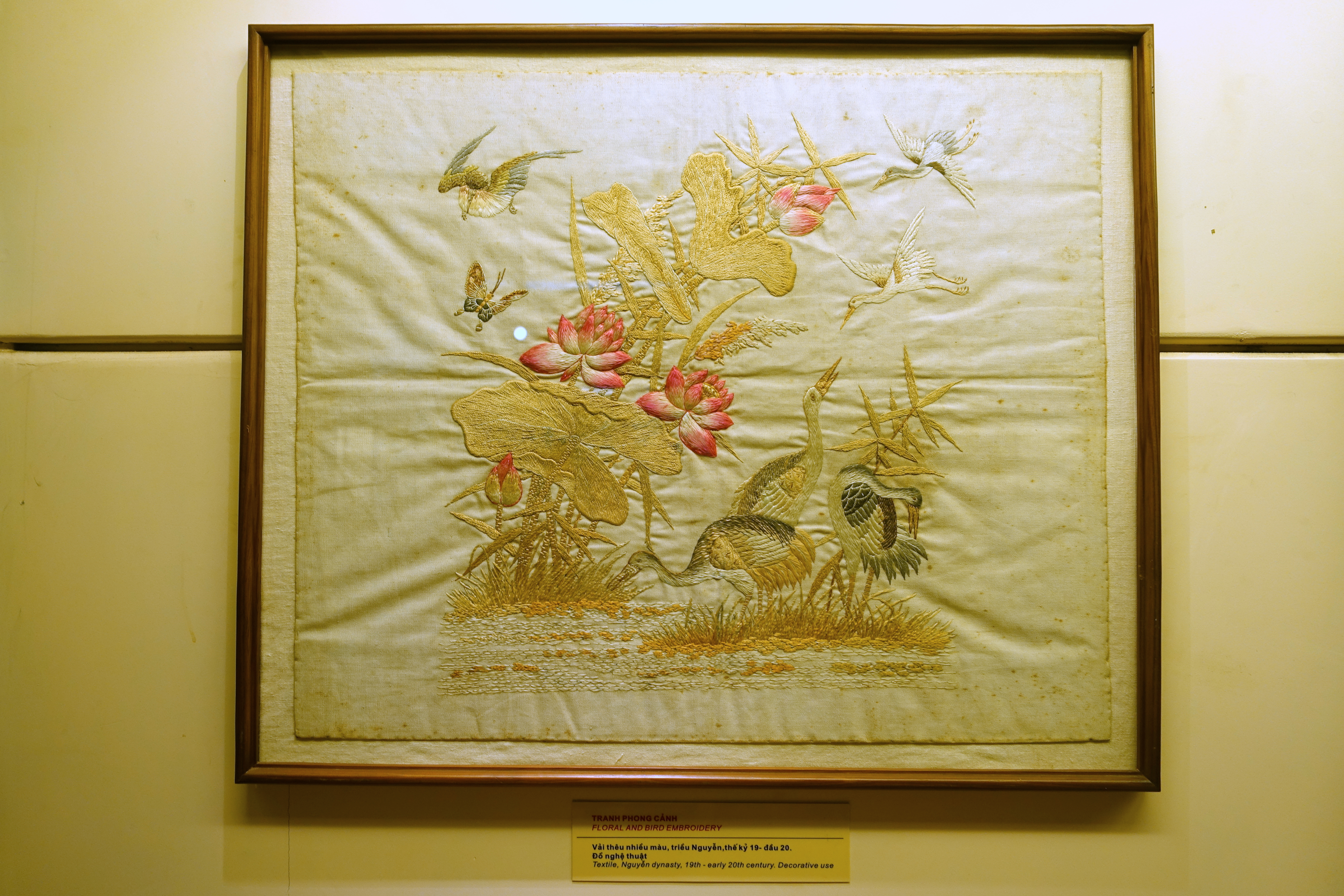
Embroidery painting of floral and bird in the Nguyễn dynasty

Vietnamese art is from one of the oldest of such cultures in the Southeast Asian region. A rich artistic heritage that dates to prehistoric times and includes: silk painting, sculpture, pottery, ceramics, woodblock prints, architecture, music, dance, and theatre.

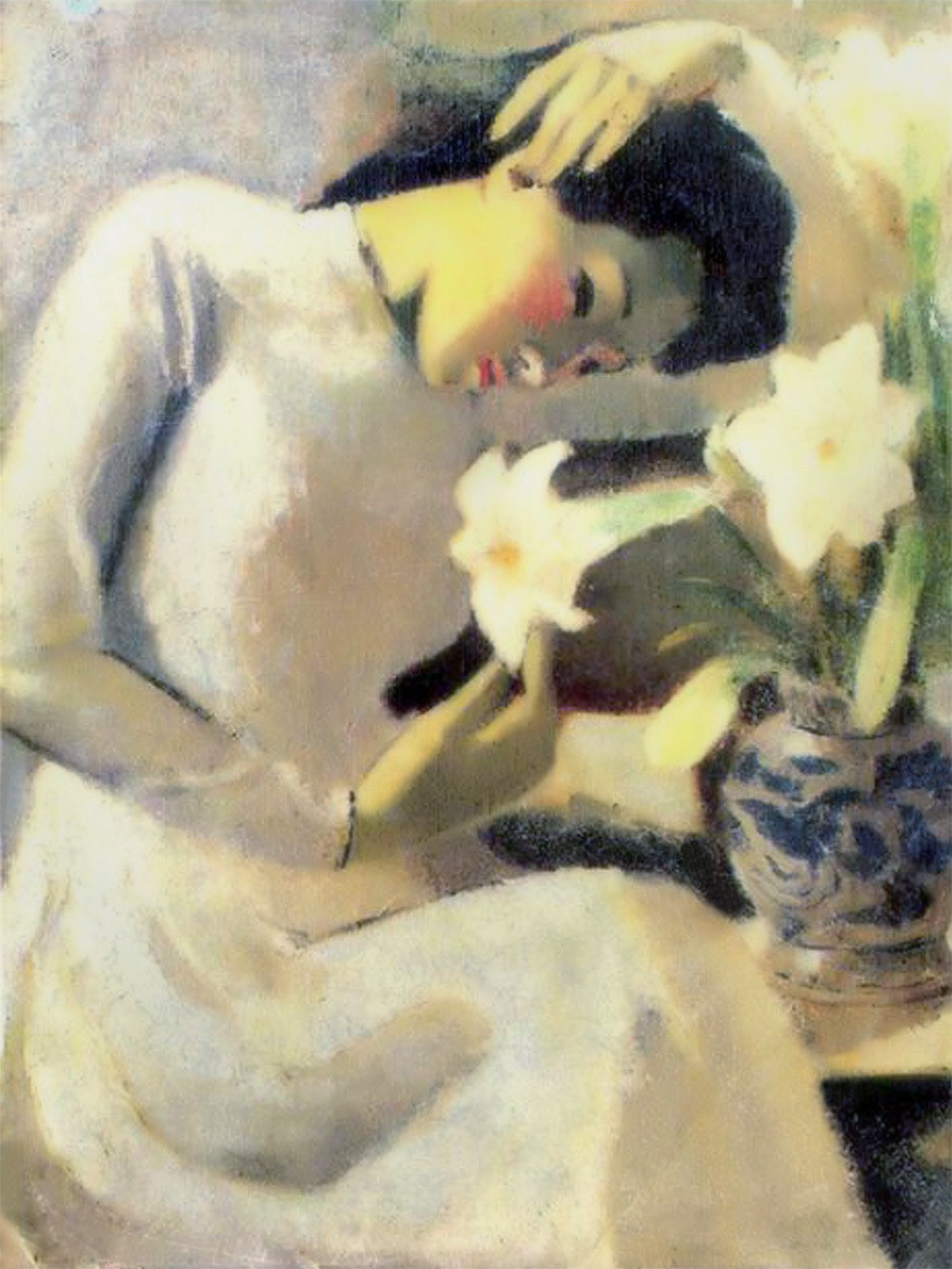
Tô Ngọc Vân, Thiếu nữ bên hoa huệ (Young Woman with Lily), 1943, oil

Traditional Vietnamese art is art practiced in Vietnam or by Vietnamese artists, from ancient times (including the elaborate Đông Sơn drums) to post-Chinese domination art which was strongly influenced by Chinese Buddhist art, among other philosophies such as Taoism and Confucianism. The art of Champa and French art also played a smaller role later on.

The Chinese influence on Vietnamese art extends into Vietnamese pottery and ceramics, calligraphy, and traditional architecture. Currently, Vietnamese lacquer paintings have proven to be quite popular.

The Nguyễn dynasty, the last ruling dynasty of Vietnam (c. 1802–1945), saw a renewed interest in ceramics and porcelain art. Imperial courts across Asia imported Vietnamese ceramics.

Despite how highly developed the performing arts (such as imperial court music and dance) became during the Nguyễn dynasty, some view other fields of art as beginning to decline during the latter part of the Nguyễn dynasty.

Beginning in the 19th century, modern art and French artistic influences spread into Vietnam. In the early 20th century, the École Supérieure des Beaux Arts de l'Indochine (Indochina College of Arts) was founded to teach European methods and exercised influence mostly in the larger cities, such as Hanoi and Ho Chi Minh City.

Travel restrictions imposed on the Vietnamese during France's 80-year rule of Vietnam and the long period of war for national independence meant that very few Vietnamese artists were able to train or work outside of Vietnam. A small number of artists from well-to-do backgrounds had the opportunity to go to France and make their careers there for the most part. Examples include Le Thi Luu, Le Pho, Mai Trung Thu, Le Van De, Le Ba Dang, and Pham Tang.

Modern Vietnamese artists began to utilize French techniques with many traditional mediums such as silk, lacquer, etc., thus creating a unique blend of eastern and western elements.

==== Vietnamese calligraphy ====
Calligraphy has had a long history in Vietnam, previously using Chữ Hán along with Chữ Nôm. However, most modern Vietnamese calligraphy instead uses the Roman-character based Chữ Quốc Ngữ, which has proven to be very popular.

In the past, with literacy in the old character-based writing systems of Vietnam being restricted to scholars and elites, calligraphy nevertheless still played an important part in Vietnamese life. On special occasions such as the Tết Nguyên Đán, people would go to the village teacher or scholar to make them a calligraphy hanging (often poetry, folk sayings, or even single words). People who could not read or write also often commissioned scholars to write prayers which they would burn at temple shrines.

== South Asian art ==
=== Buddhist art ===
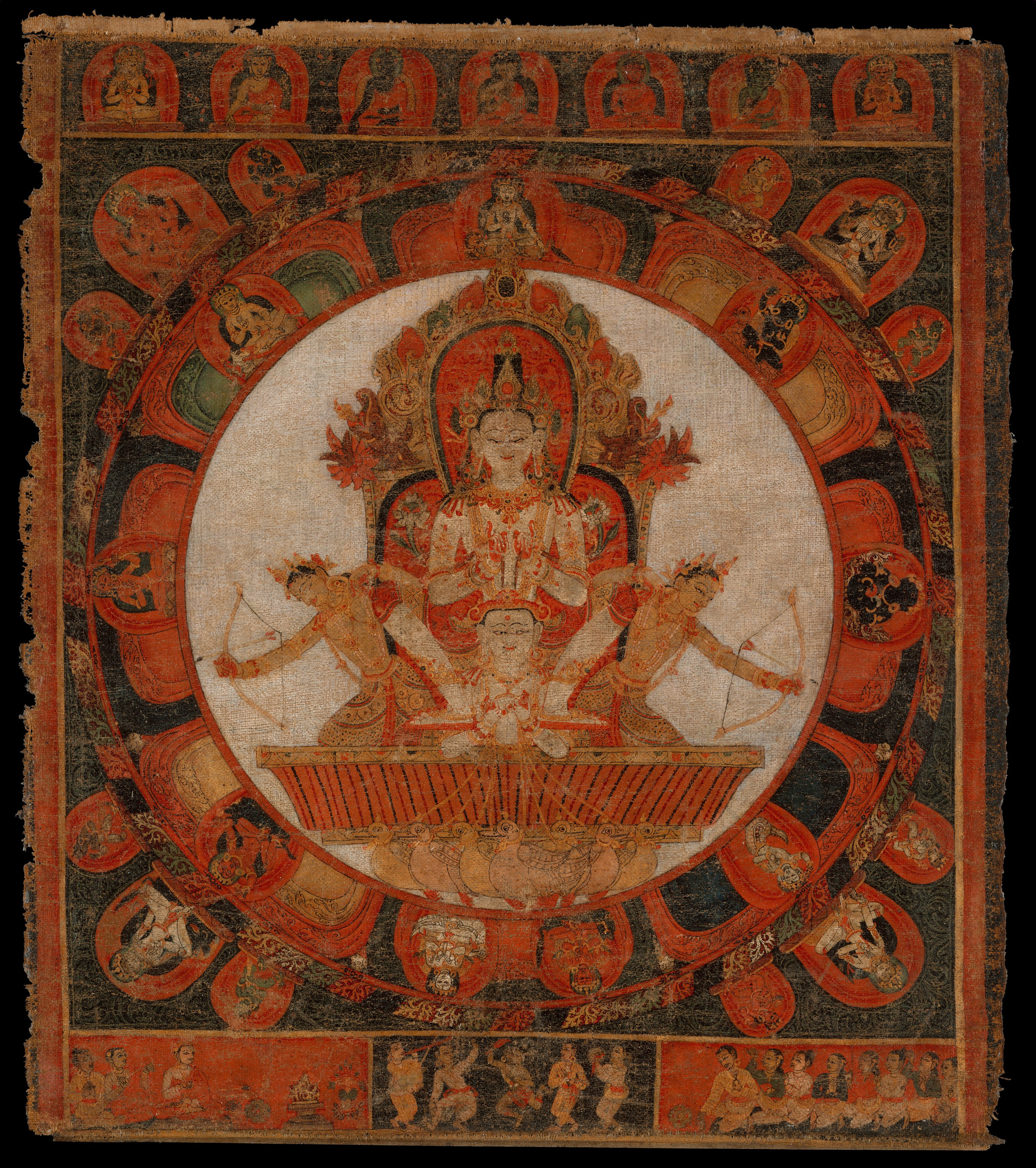
Mandala of Chandra, God of the Moon, Nepal (Kathmandu Valley) via The Metropolitan Museum of Art

Buddhist art originated in the Indian subcontinent in the centuries following the life of the historical Gautama Buddha in the 6th to 5th century BCE, before evolving through its contact with other cultures and its diffusion through the rest of Asia and the world. Buddhist art traveled with believers as the dharma spread, adapted, and evolved in each new host country. It developed to the north through Central Asia and into East Asia to form the Northern branch of Buddhist art, and to the east as far as Southeast Asia to form the Southern branch of Buddhist art. In India, Buddhist art flourished and even influenced the development of Hindu art, until Buddhism nearly disappeared in India around the 10th century CE due in part to the vigorous expansion of Islam alongside Hinduism.

A common visual device in Buddhist art is the mandala. From a viewer's perspective, it represents schematically the ideal universe. In various spiritual traditions, mandalas may be employed for focusing the attention of aspirants and adepts, a spiritual teaching tool, for establishing a sacred space, and as an aid to meditation and trance induction. Its symbolic nature can help one "to access progressively deeper levels of the unconscious, ultimately assisting the meditator to experience a mystical sense of oneness with the ultimate unity from which the cosmos in all its manifold forms arises." The psychoanalyst Carl Jung saw the mandala as "a representation of the centre of the unconscious self," and believed his paintings of mandalas enabled him to identify emotional disorders and work towards wholeness in personality.

=== Bhutanese art ===
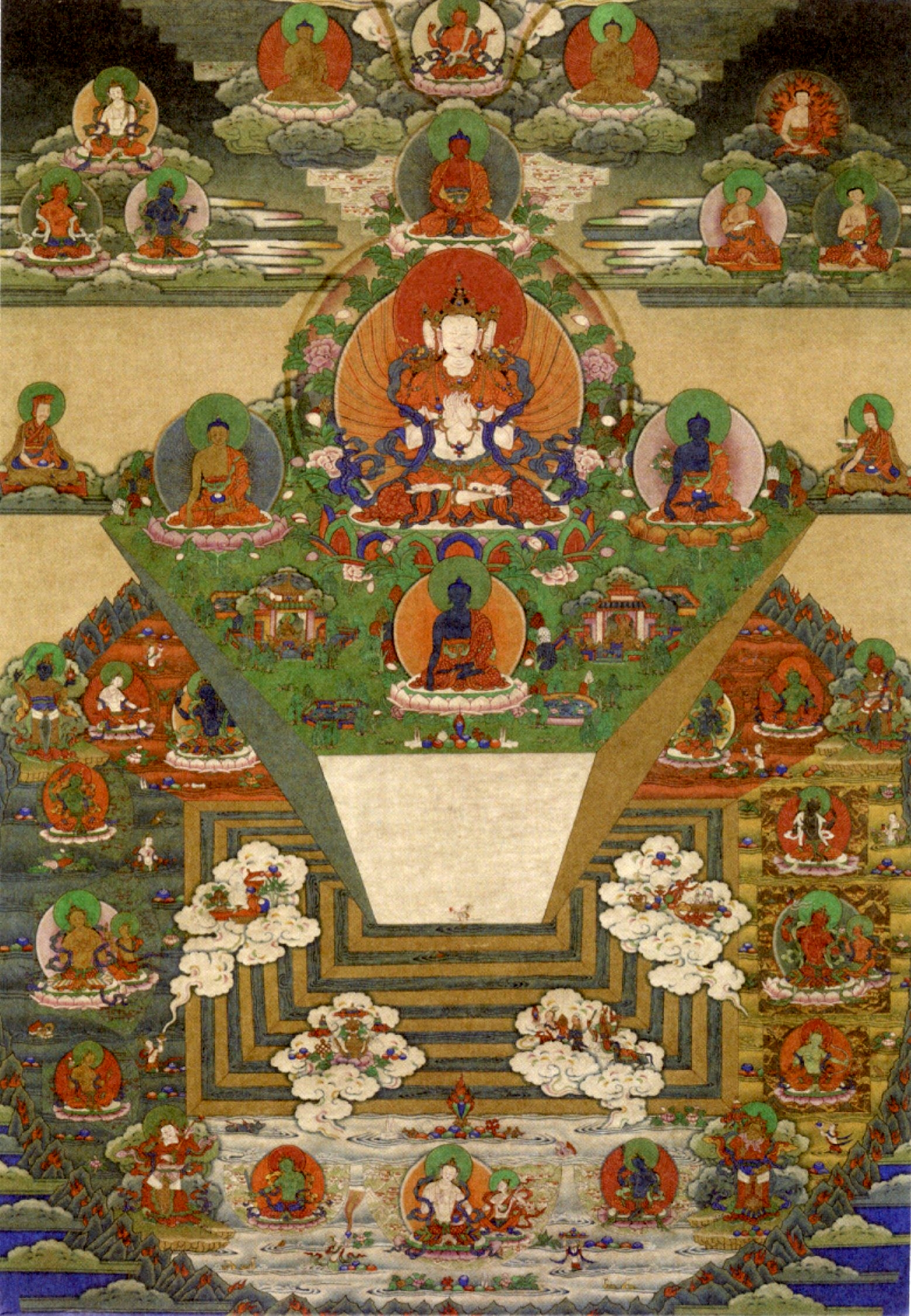
Bhutanese thanka of Mt. Meru and the Buddhist Universe, 19th century, Trongsa Dzong, Trongsa, Bhutan

Bhutanese art is similar to the art of Tibet. Both are based upon Vajrayana Buddhism, with its pantheon of divine beings.

The major orders of Buddhism in Bhutan are Drukpa Kagyu and Nyingma. The former is a branch of the Kagyu School and is known for paintings documenting the lineage of Buddhist masters and the 70 Je Khenpo (leaders of the Bhutanese monastic establishment). The Nyingma order is known for images of Padmasambhava, who is credited with introducing Buddhism into Bhutan in the 7th century. According to legend, Padmasambhava hid sacred treasures for future Buddhist masters, especially Pema Lingpa, to find. The treasure finders (tertön) are also frequent subjects of Nyingma art.

Each divine being is assigned special shapes, colors, and/or identifying objects, such as lotus, conch-shell, thunderbolt, and begging bowl. All sacred images are made to exact specifications that have remained remarkably unchanged for centuries.

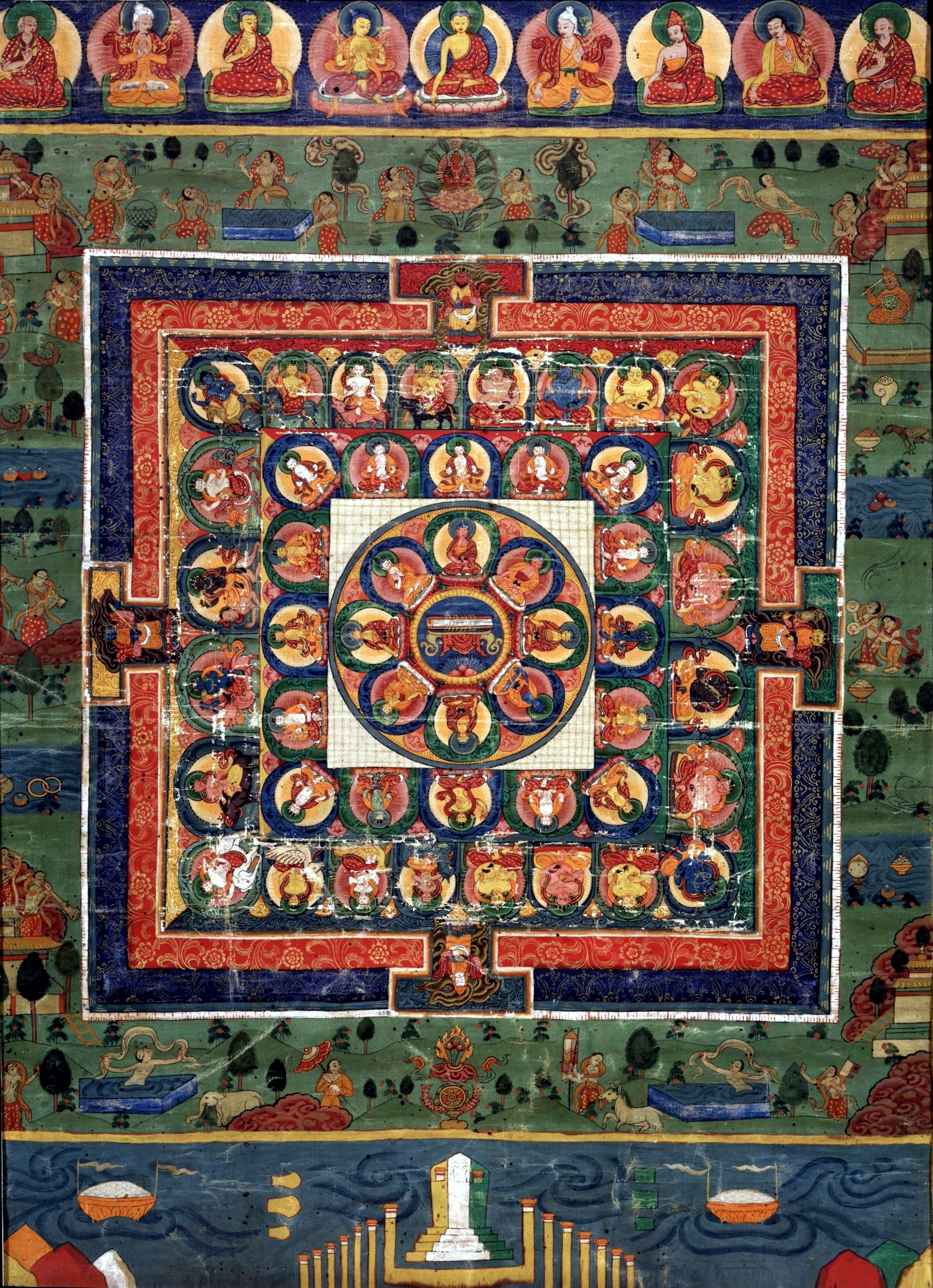
Painted Bhutanese Medicine Buddha mandala with the goddess Prajnaparamita in center, 19th century, Rubin Museum of Art.

Bhutanese art is particularly rich in bronzes of different kinds that are collectively known by the name Kham-so (made in Kham) even though they are made in Bhutan, because the technique of making them was originally imported from the eastern province of Tibet called Kham. Wall paintings and sculptures, in these regions, are formulated on the principal ageless ideals of Buddhist art forms. Even though their emphasis on detail is derived from Tibetan models, their origins can be discerned easily, despite the profusely embroidered garments and glittering ornaments with which these figures are lavishly covered. In the grotesque world of demons, the artists apparently had greater freedom of action than when modeling images of divine beings.

The arts and crafts of Bhutan that represent the exclusive "spirit and identity of the Himalayan kingdom" are defined as the art of Zorig Chosum, which means the "thirteen arts and crafts of Bhutan"; the thirteen crafts are carpentry, painting, paper making, blacksmithing, weaving, sculpting, and many other crafts. The Institute of Zorig Chosum in Thimphu is the premier institution of traditional arts and crafts set up by the Government of Bhutan with the sole objective of preserving the rich culture and tradition of Bhutan and training students in all traditional art forms; there is another similar institution in eastern Bhutan known as Trashi Yangtse. Bhutanese rural life is also displayed in the 'Folk Heritage Museum' in Thimphu. There is also a 'Voluntary Artists Studio' in Thimphu to encourage and promote the art forms among the youth of Thimphu.

=== Indian art ===
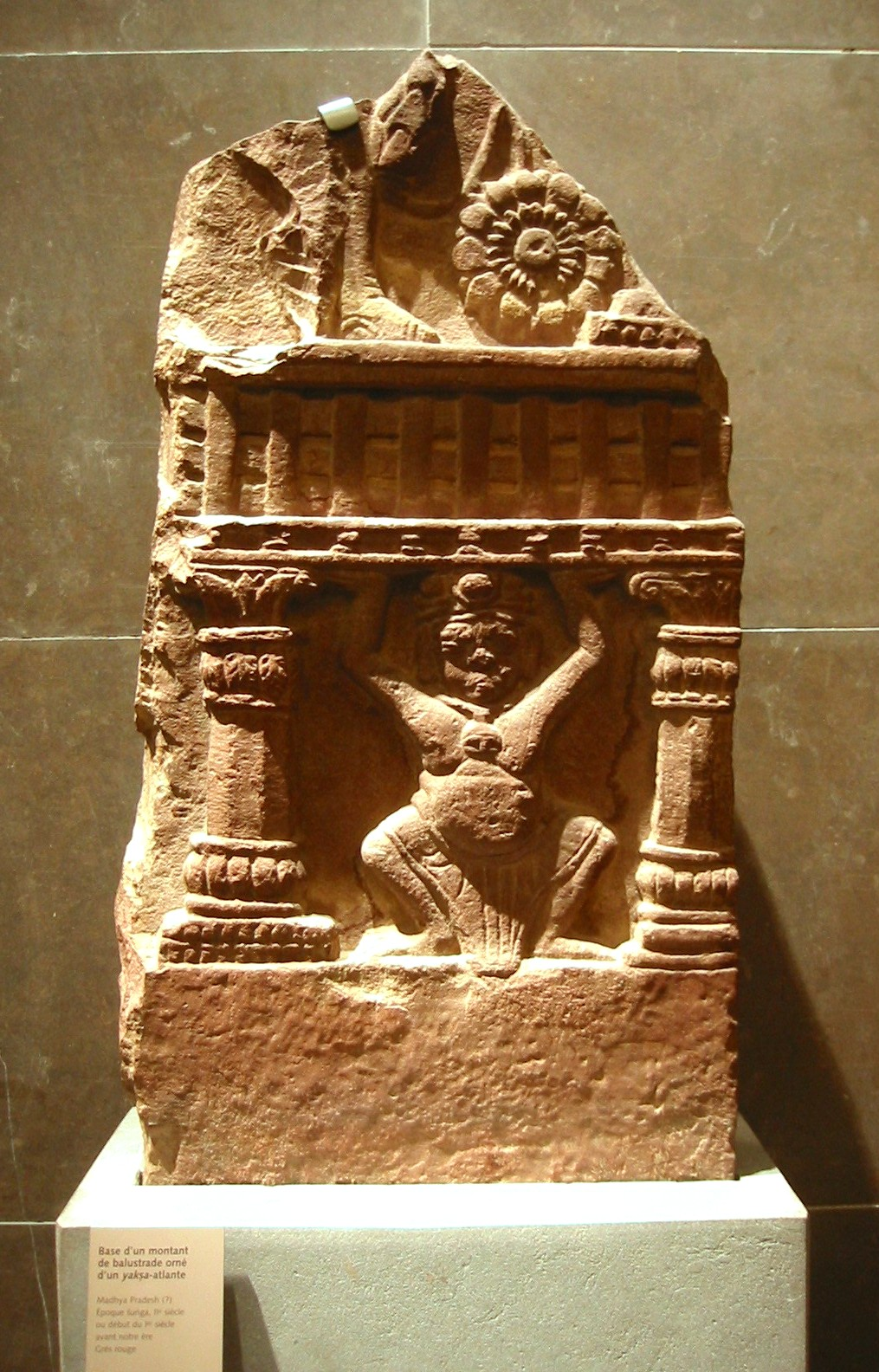
Balustrade-holding Yaksha, Madhya Pradesh, India, Shunga period (2nd–1st century BCE). Musee Guimet.

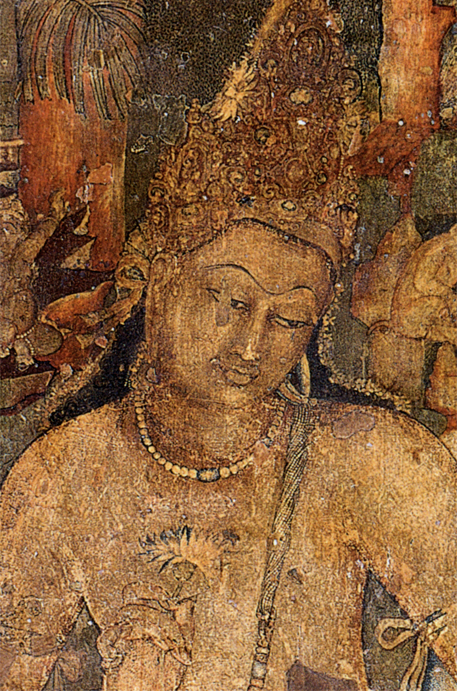
Fresco from Ajanta Caves, c. 450–500

Indian art can be classified into specific periods, each reflecting certain religious, political, and cultural developments. The earliest examples are the petroglyphs such as those found in Bhimbetka, some of them dating to before 5500 BC. The production of such works continued for several millennia.

The art of the Indus Valley Civilization followed. Later examples include the carved pillars of Ellora, Maharashtra state. Other examples are the frescoes of Ajanta and Ellora Caves.

The contributions of the Mughal Empire to Indian art include Mughal painting, a style of miniature painting heavily influenced by Persian miniatures, and Mughal architecture.

During the British Raj, modern Indian painting evolved as a result of combining traditional Indian and European styles. Raja Ravi Varma was a pioneer of this period. The Bengal school of Art developed during this period, led by Abanidranath Tagore, Gaganendranath Tagore, Jamini Roy, Mukul Dey, and Nandalal Bose.

One of the most popular art forms in India is called Rangoli. It is a form of sandpainting decoration that uses finely ground white powder and colours, and is used commonly outside homes in India.

The visual arts (sculpture, painting, and architecture) are tightly interrelated with the non-visual arts. According to Kapila Vatsyayan, "Classical Indian architecture, sculpture, painting, literature (kaavya), music, and dancing evolved their own rules conditioned by their respective media, but they shared with one another not only the underlying spiritual beliefs of the Indian religio-philosophic mind, but also the procedures by which the relationships of the symbol and the spiritual states were worked out in detail."

Insight into the unique qualities of Indian art is best achieved through an understanding of the philosophical thought, the broad cultural history, social, religious, and political background of the artworks.

Specific periods:

- Hinduism, Jainism and Buddhism of the ancient period (3500 BCE – present)
- Islamic ascendancy (712–1757 CE)
- The colonial period (1757–1947)
- Modern and Postmodern art in India
- Independence and the postcolonial period (Post-1947)

=== Nepalese art ===
The traditional culture of Kathmandu, and of Nepal more broadly, has been shaped by a long interaction between Hindu and Buddhist traditions, which have influenced the country's religious practices, festivals, art, architecture, and social customs. In the Kathmandu Valley these traditions have historically developed alongside one another, producing a distinctive cultural landscape in which Hindu and Buddhist practices and institutions are often closely intertwined. The cultural life of the region has also been influenced by other religious communities, including Jains, Muslims, and Christians, reflecting the wider religious and cultural diversity of Nepal.

=== Pakistani art ===
Pakistani art has a long tradition and history. It consists of a variety of art forms, including painting, sculpture, calligraphy, pottery, and textile arts such as woven silk. Geographically, it is a part of the Indian subcontinent art, including what is now Pakistan.

== Central Asian art ==
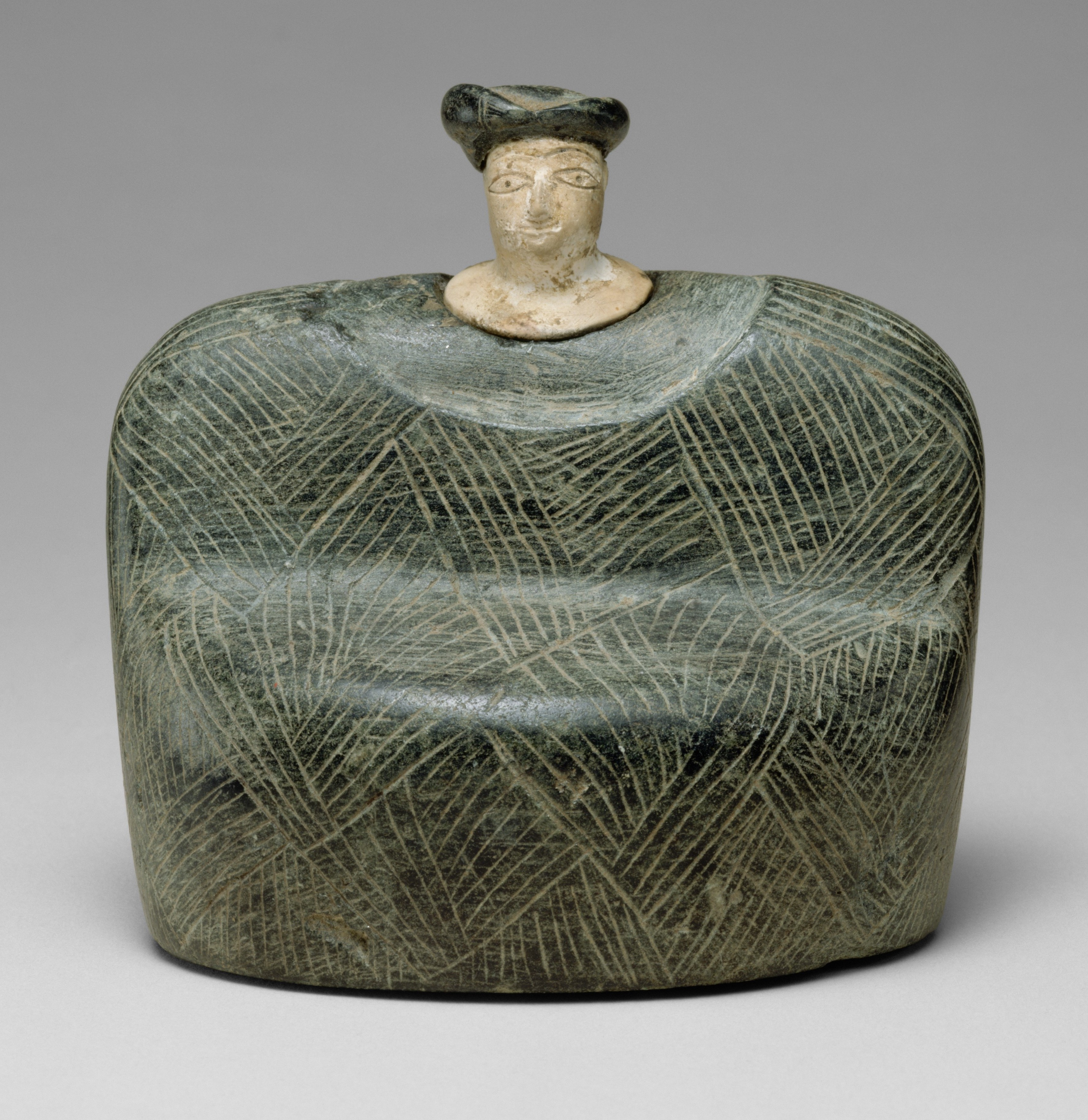
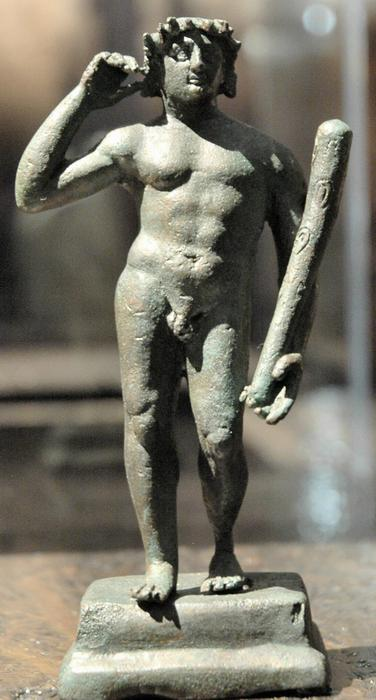
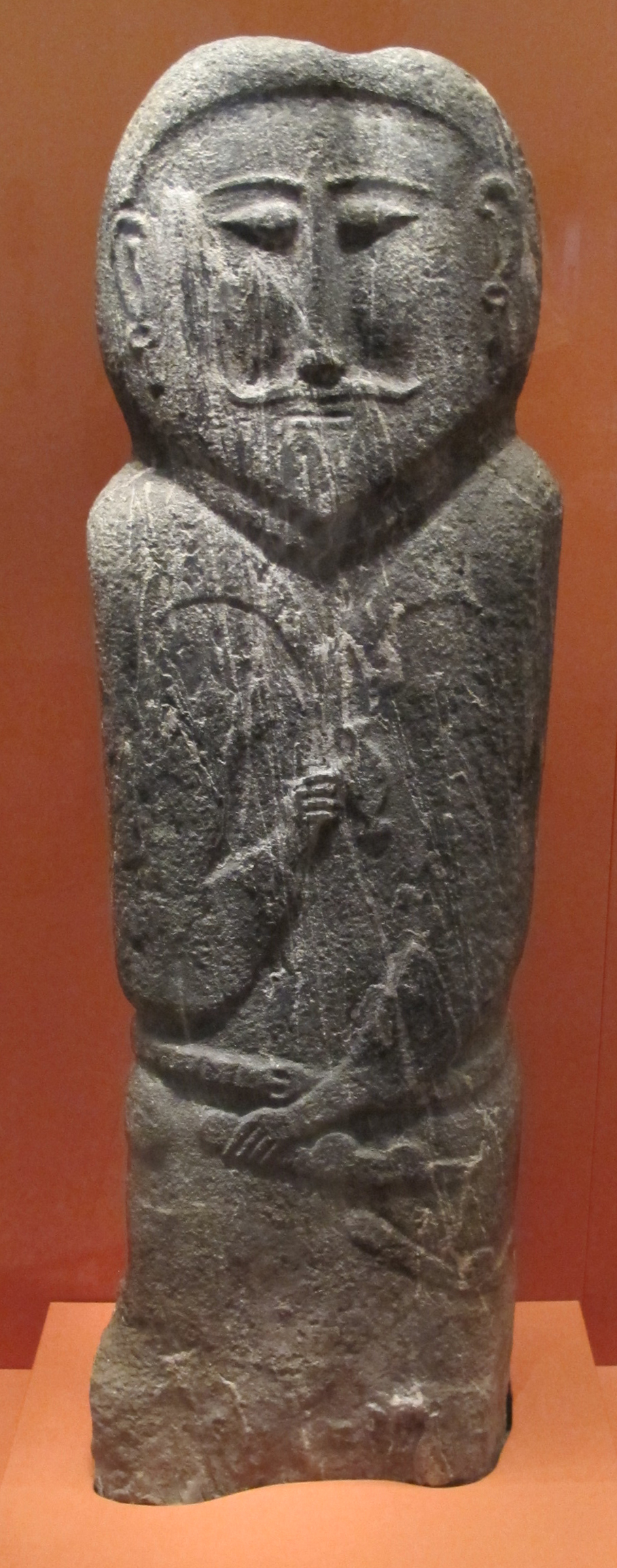
Female statuette of the BMAC (3rd-2nd millennium BC), a Greco-Bactrian statuette from Ai-Khanoum (2nd century BC), a statuette from Kosh-Agach (8th-10th century AD).

Art in Central Asia is visual art created by the largely Turkic peoples of modern-day Kyrgyzstan, Kazakhstan, Uzbekistan, Turkmenistan, Azerbaijan, Tajikistan, Mongolia, Tibet, Afghanistan, and Pakistan as well as parts of China and Russia. In recent centuries, art in the region has been greatly influenced by Islamic art. Earlier, Central Asian art was influenced by Chinese, Greek, and Persian art, via the Silk Road transmission of art. Scythian art could transmit styles very rapidly across a very wide area.

=== Nomadic folk art ===
Nomadic folk art was a vital aspect of Central Asian Art, reflecting the lifestyle of nomadic groups residing within the region. Some characteristics that this art reflects include semi-precious stones, quilt, carved door, and embroidered carpets.

== Gallery of art in Asia ==
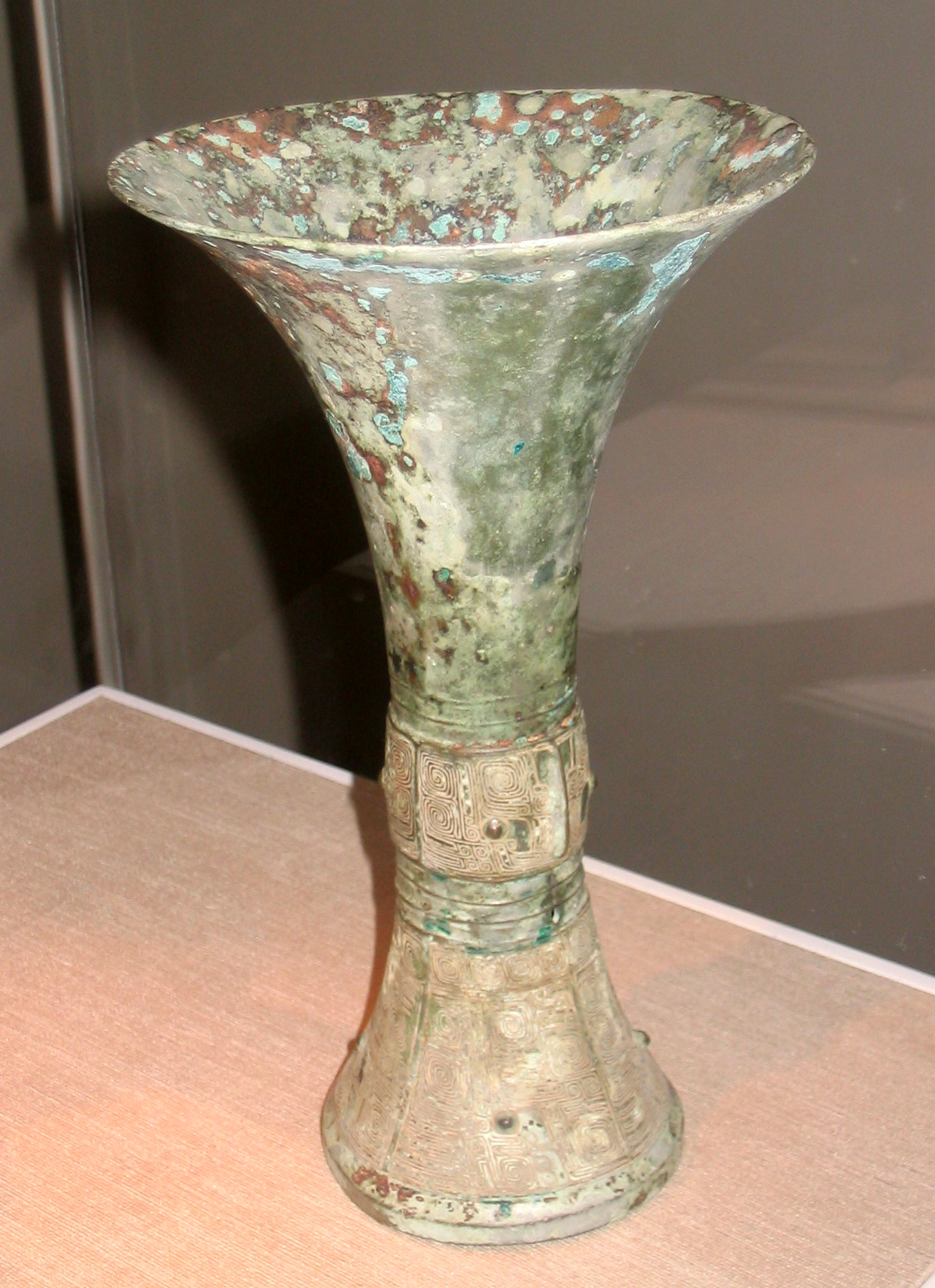
Shang dynasty (Yin) bronze ritual wine vessel, dating to the 13th century BC, Chinese

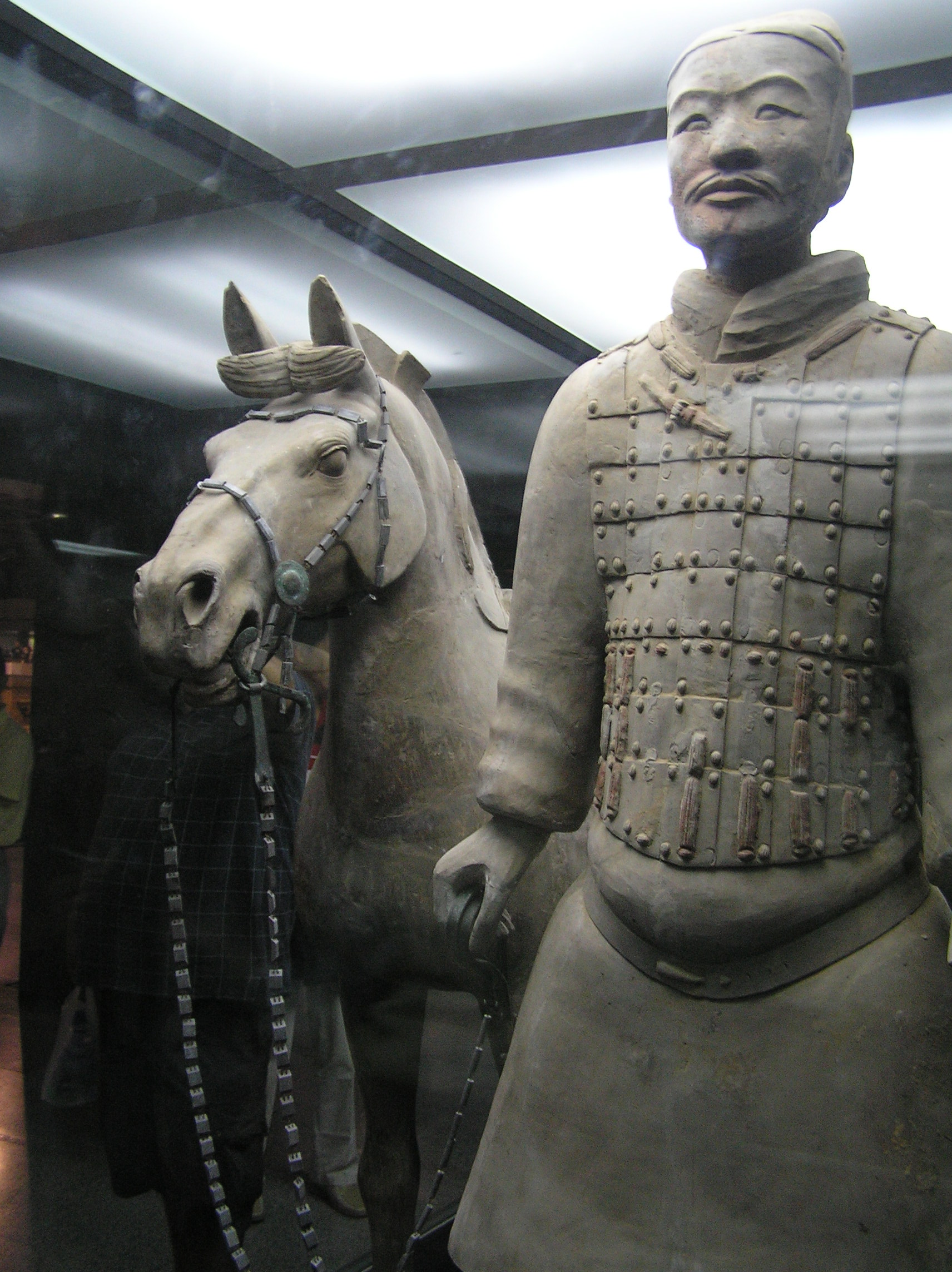
The Terracotta Army sculpture, 3rd century BC, Chinese

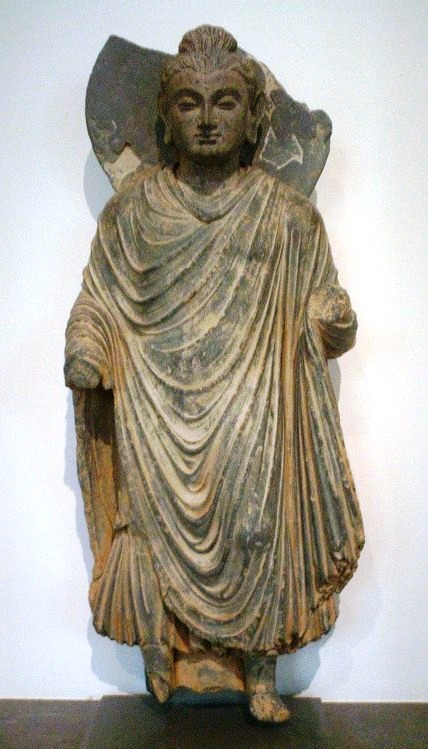
Standing Buddha sculpture, ancient region of Gandhara, northern Pakistan, 1st century CE, Musée Guimet

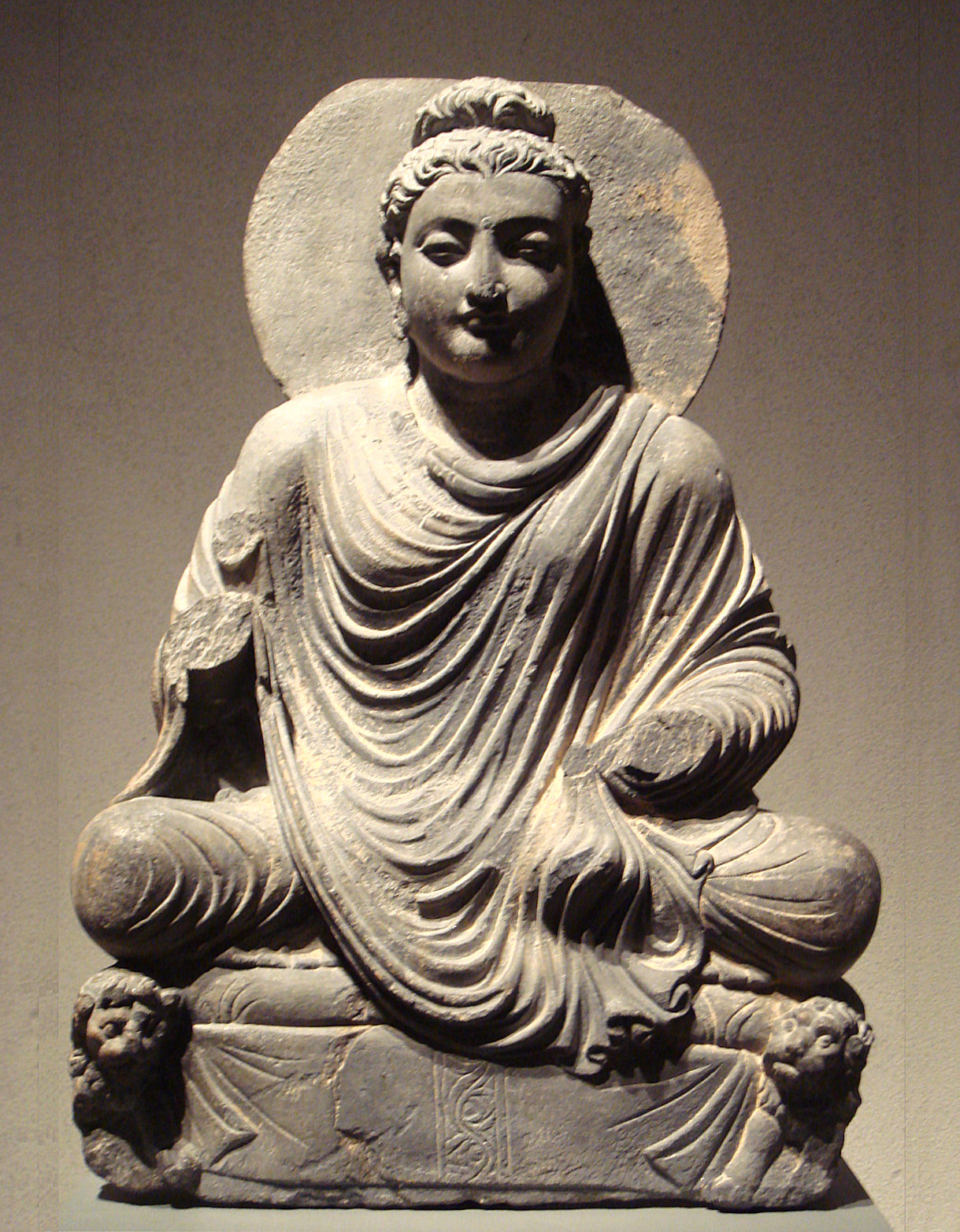
Seated Buddha, Gandhara, 2nd century CE

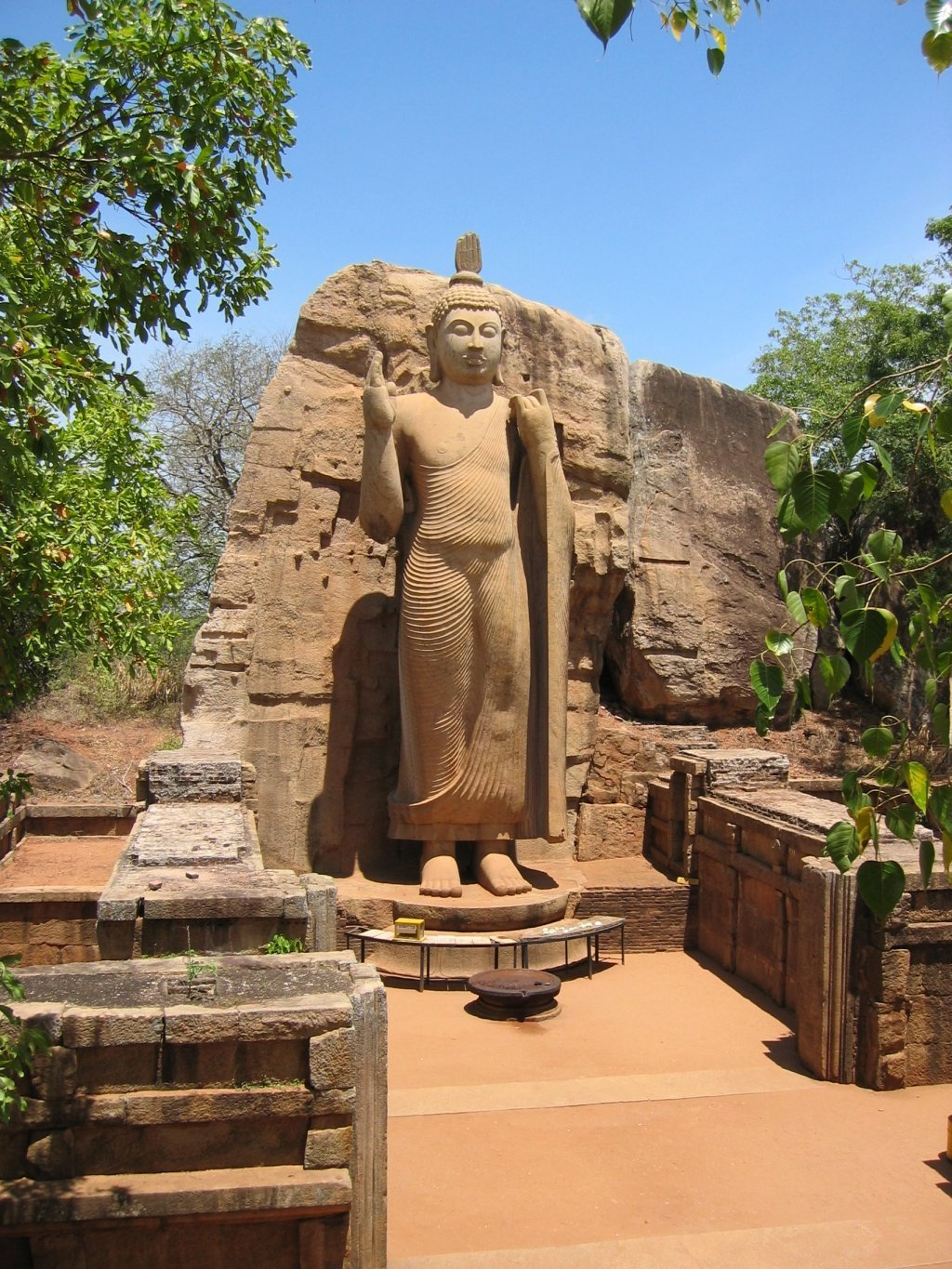
The Buddha statue of Avukana, 5th century, Sri Lanka

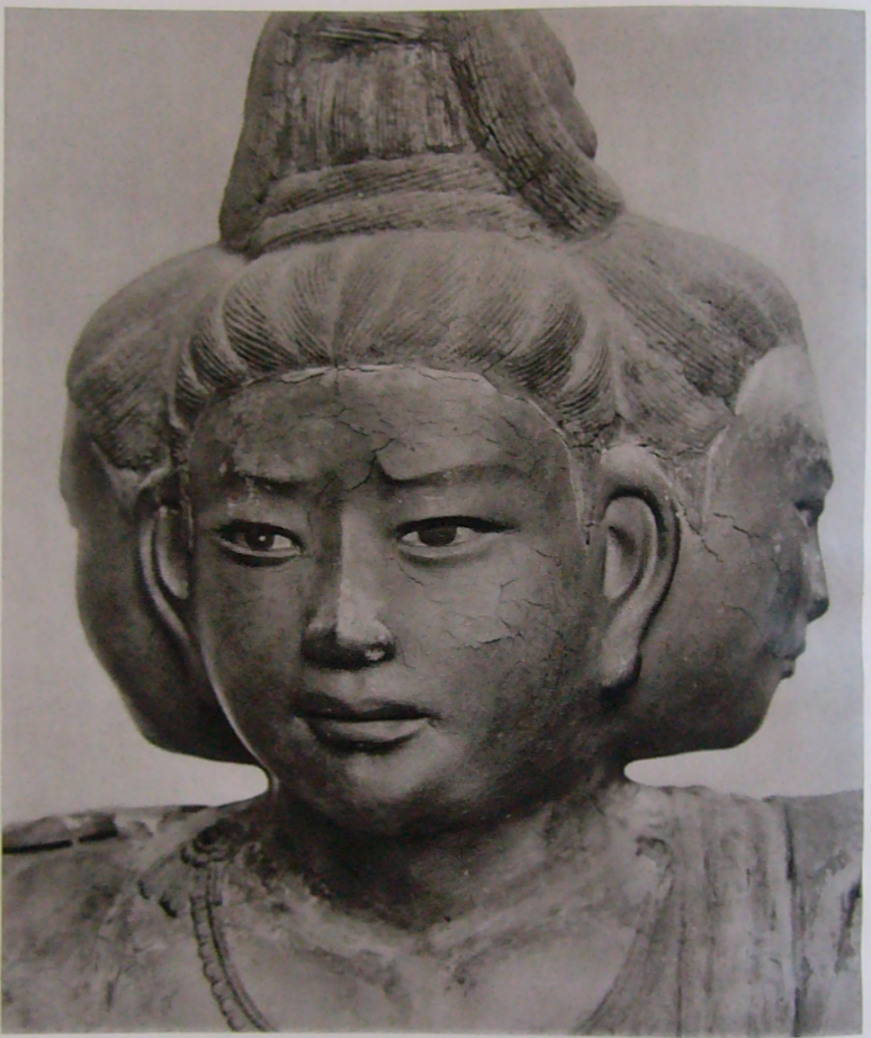
Asura in Kōfuku-ji, Nara, 734, Japanese

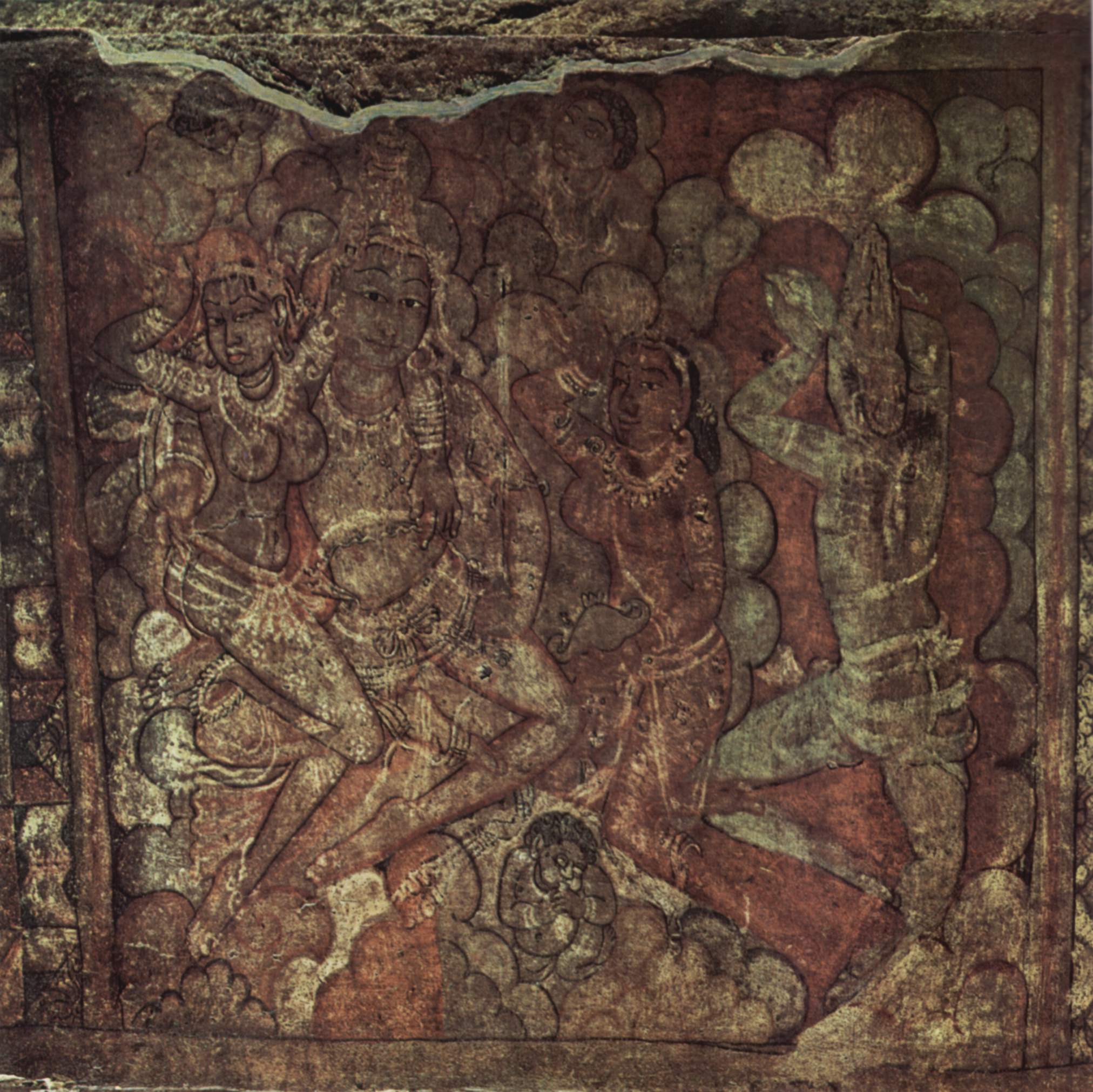
Floating Figures Dancing, mural, circa 850, Indian

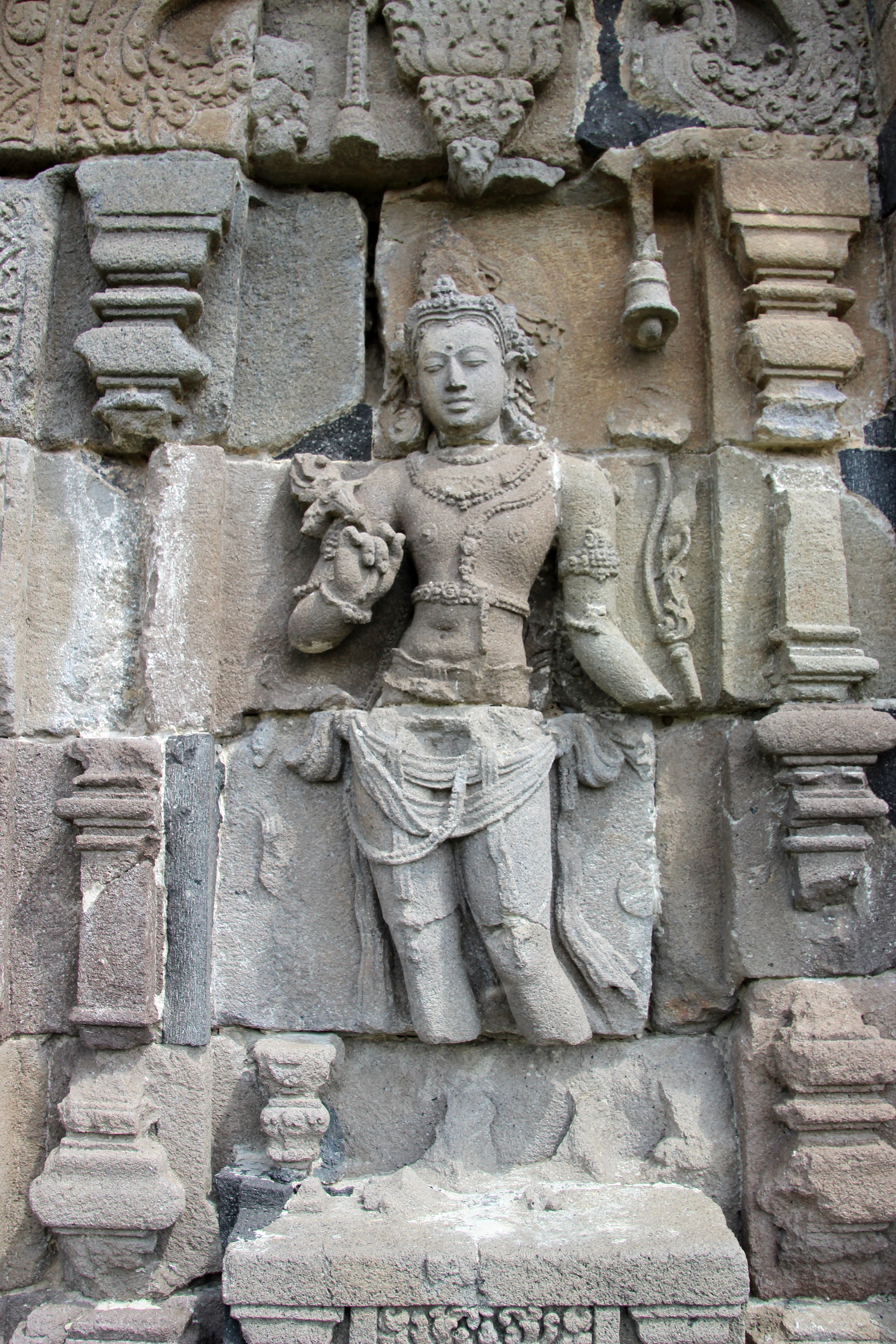
Boddhisattva of Plaosan, 9th century Shailendra art, Central Java, Indonesia.

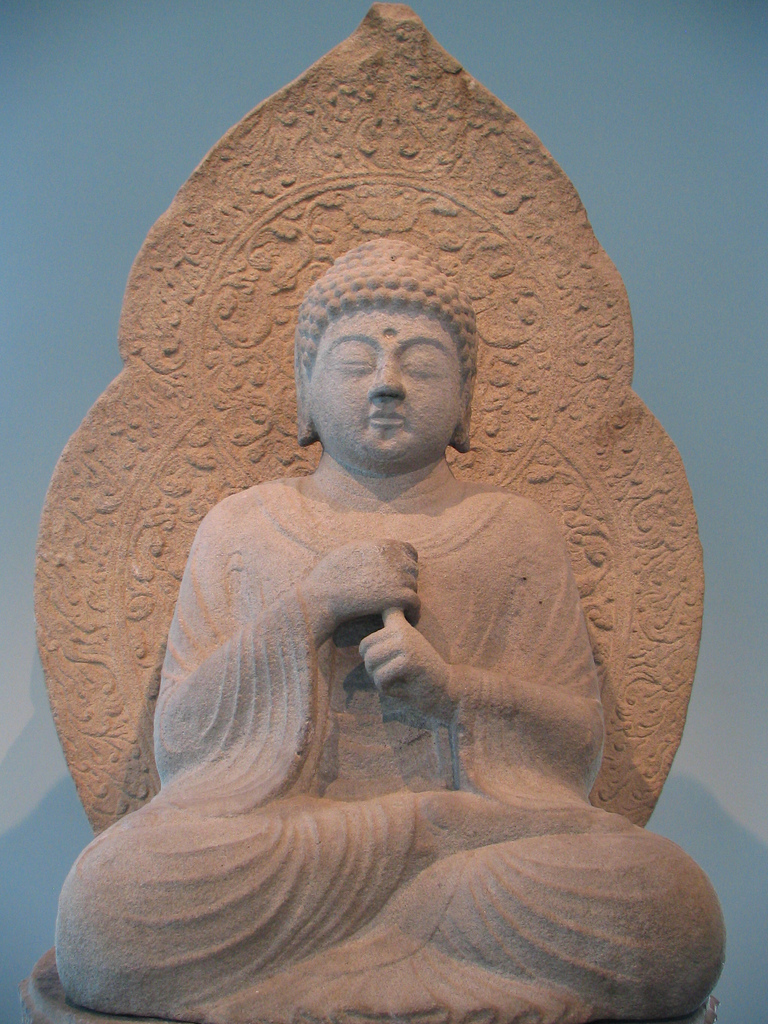
Buddhist sculpture Silla dynasty, 9th century, Korean

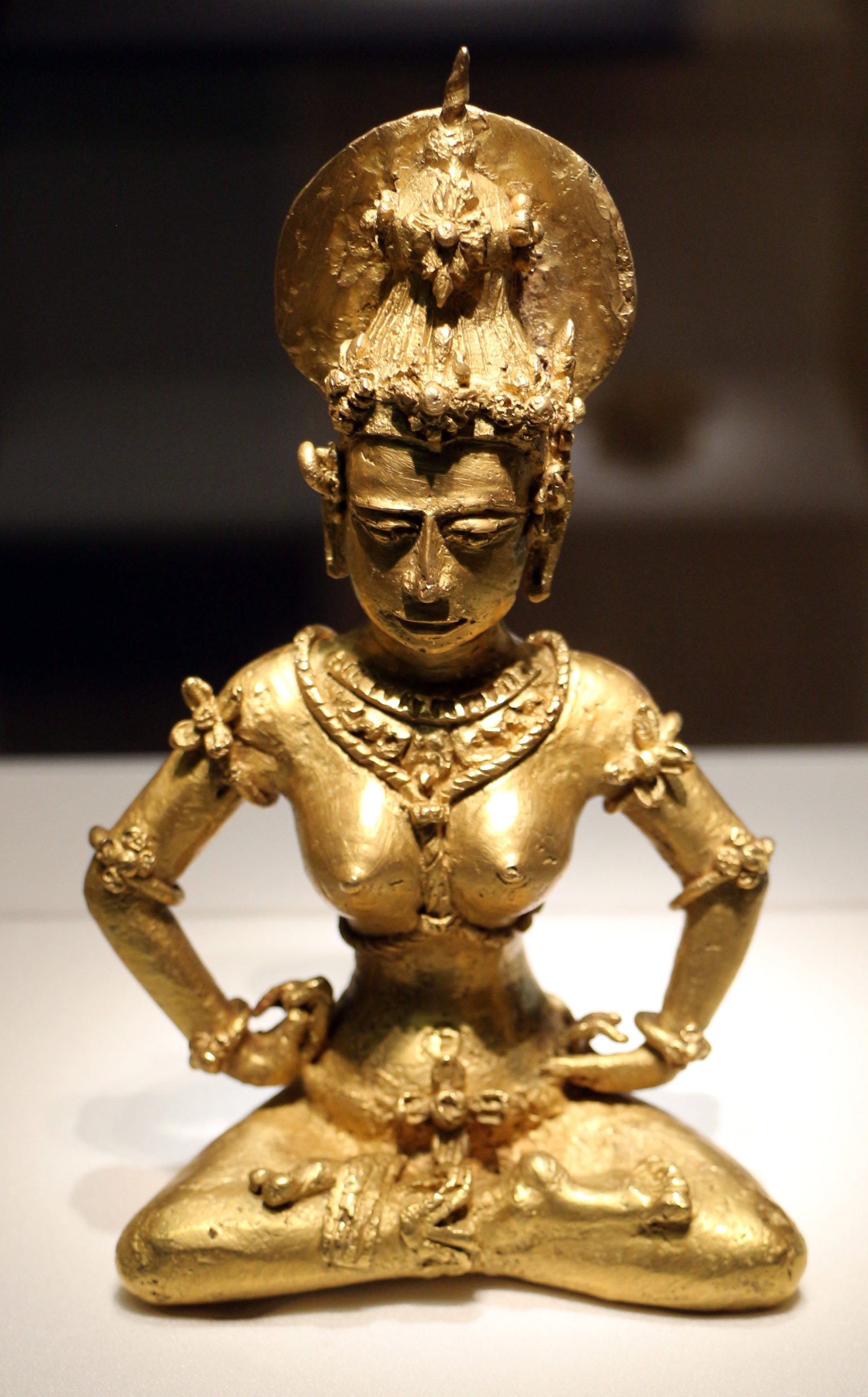
Agusan image gold statue (9th-10th century), Philippines

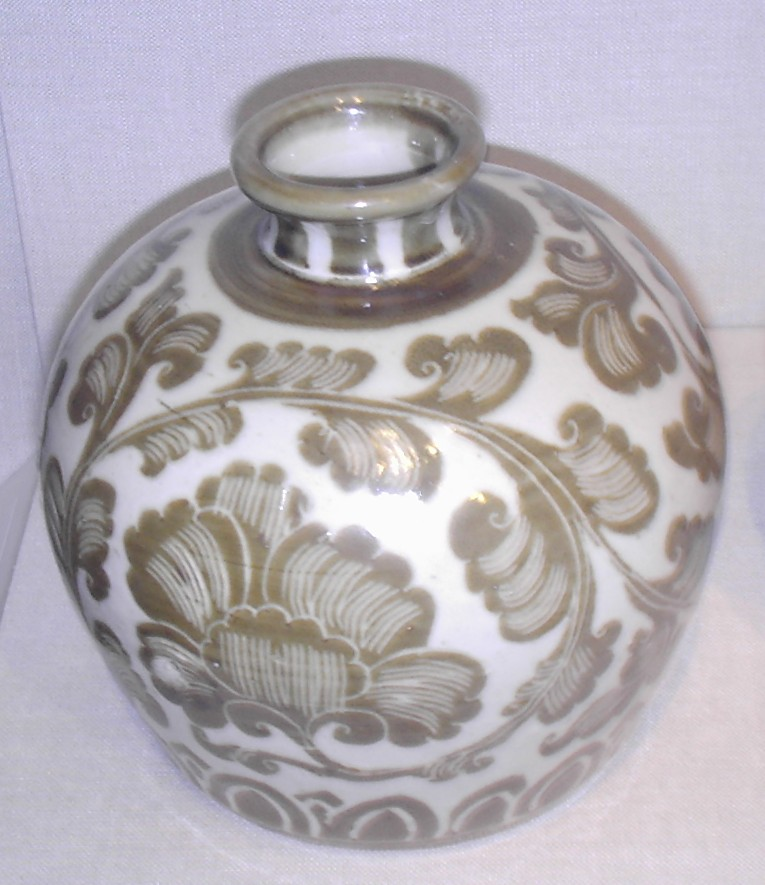
Song dynasty porcelain bottle with iron pigment over transparent colorless glaze, 11th century, Chinese

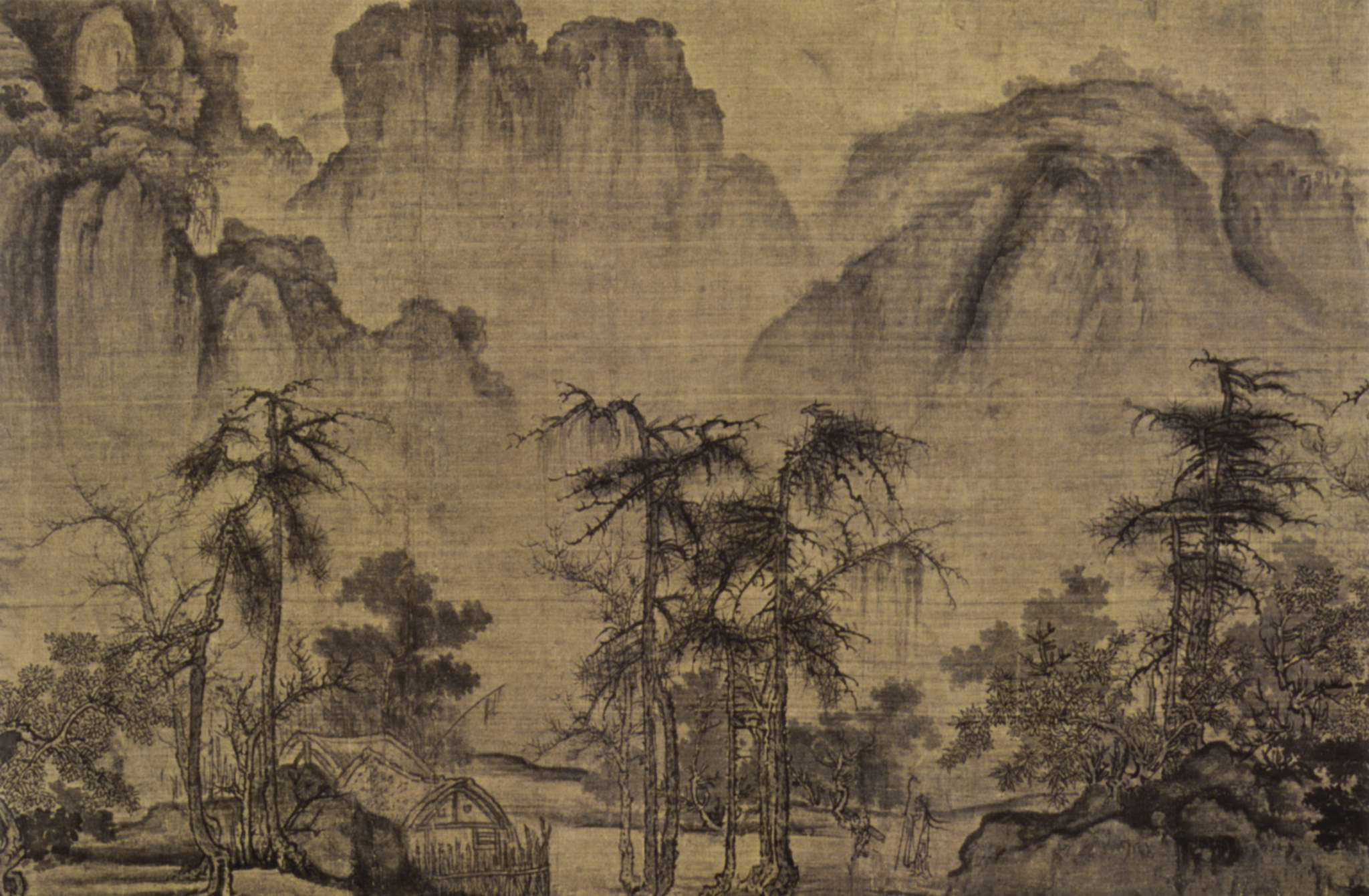
Autumn in the River Valley, Guo Xi (c. 1020–1090 AD), 1072 AD, Chinese

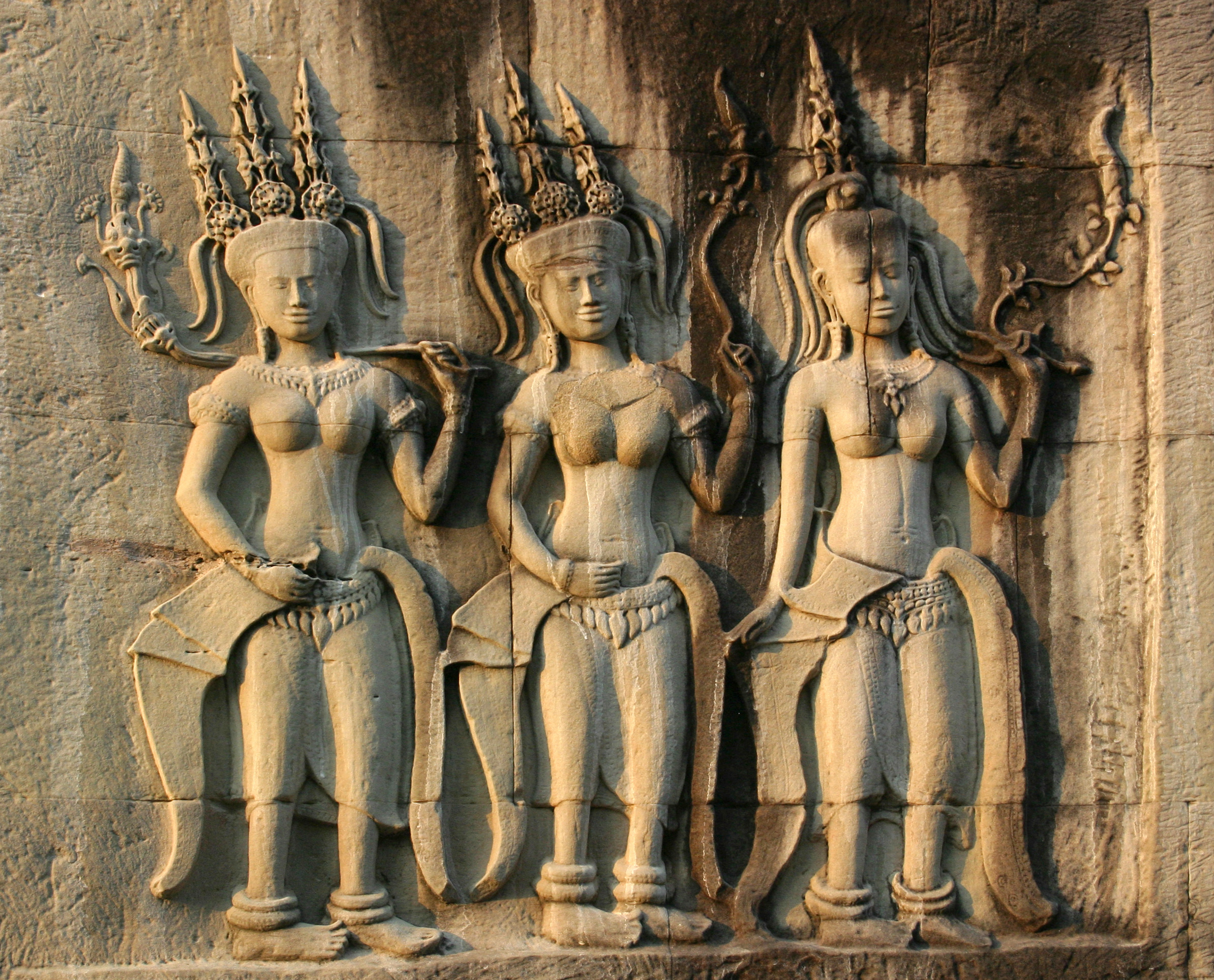
Apsaras of Angkor Wat, 12th century Cambodia

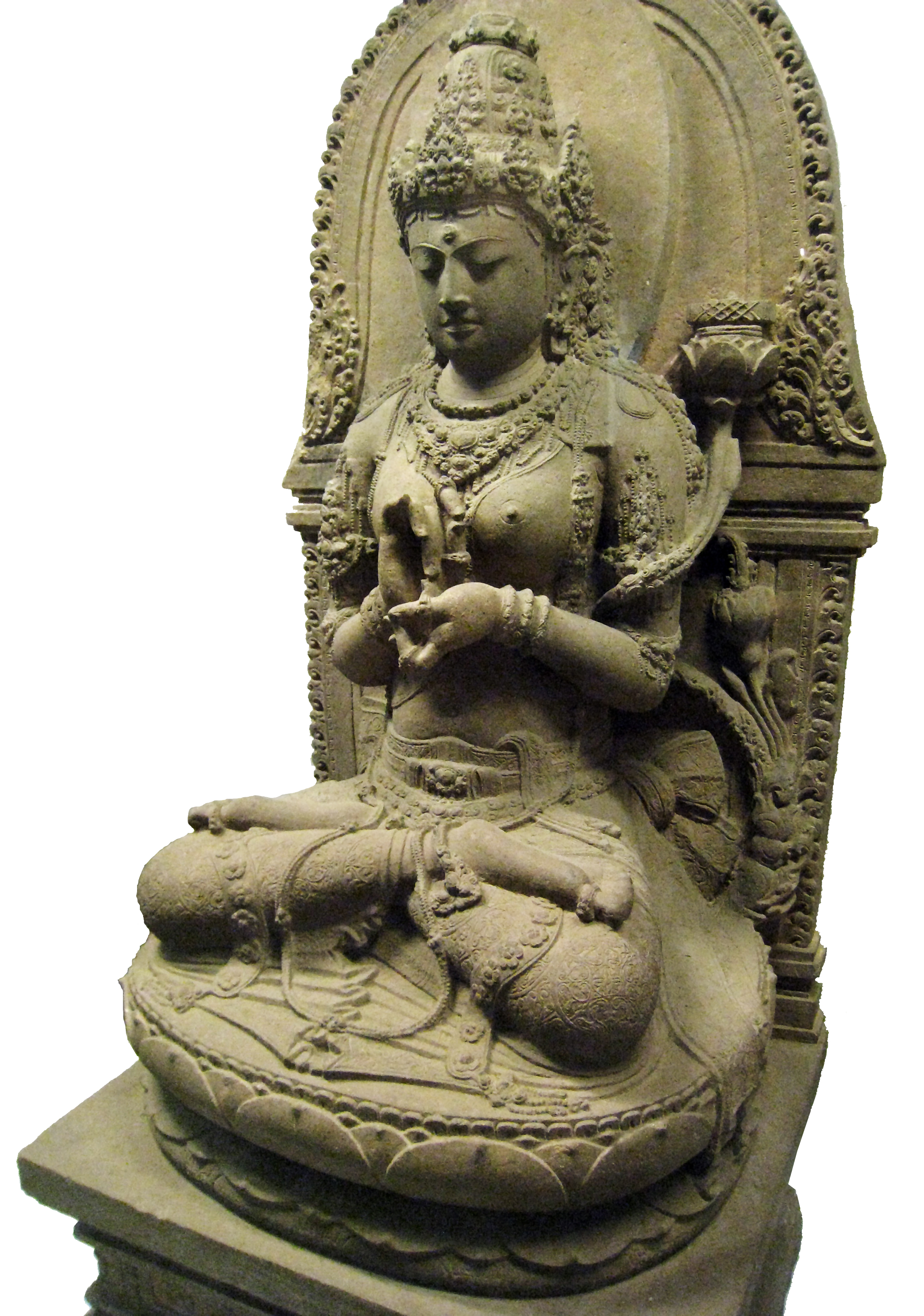
Pranjaparamita of Singhasari, 13th century Java art, Indonesia

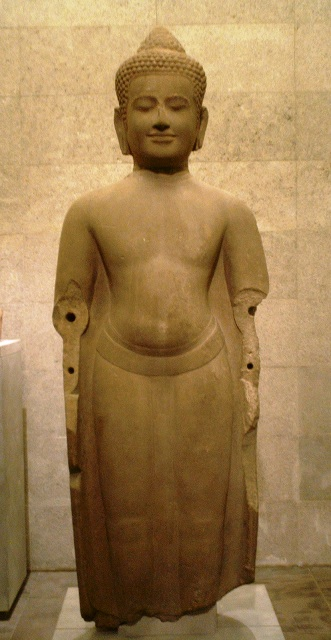
Buddha, 14th century, Cambodia

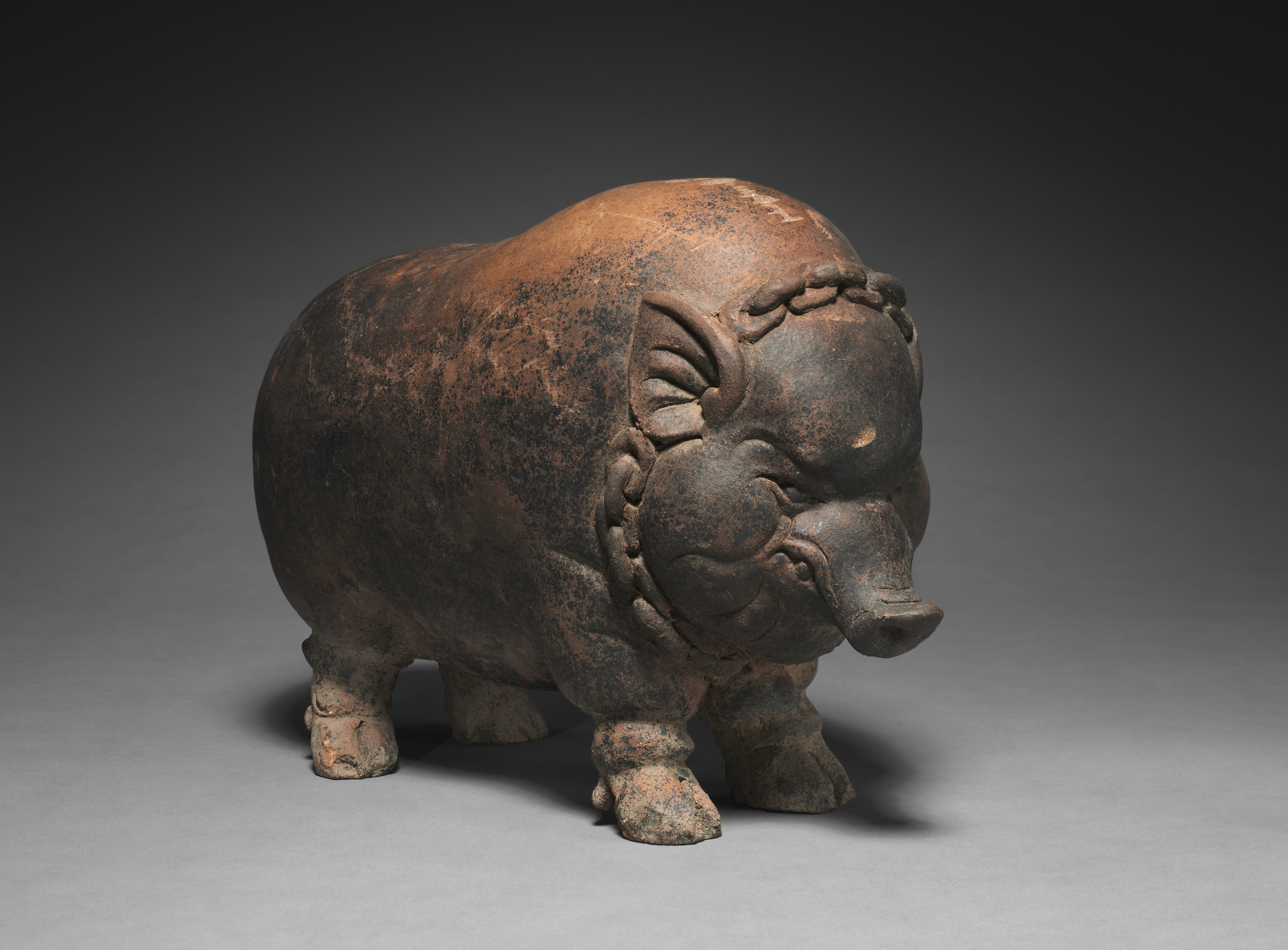
Majapahit Terracotta piggybank, 14th century East Java, Indonesia

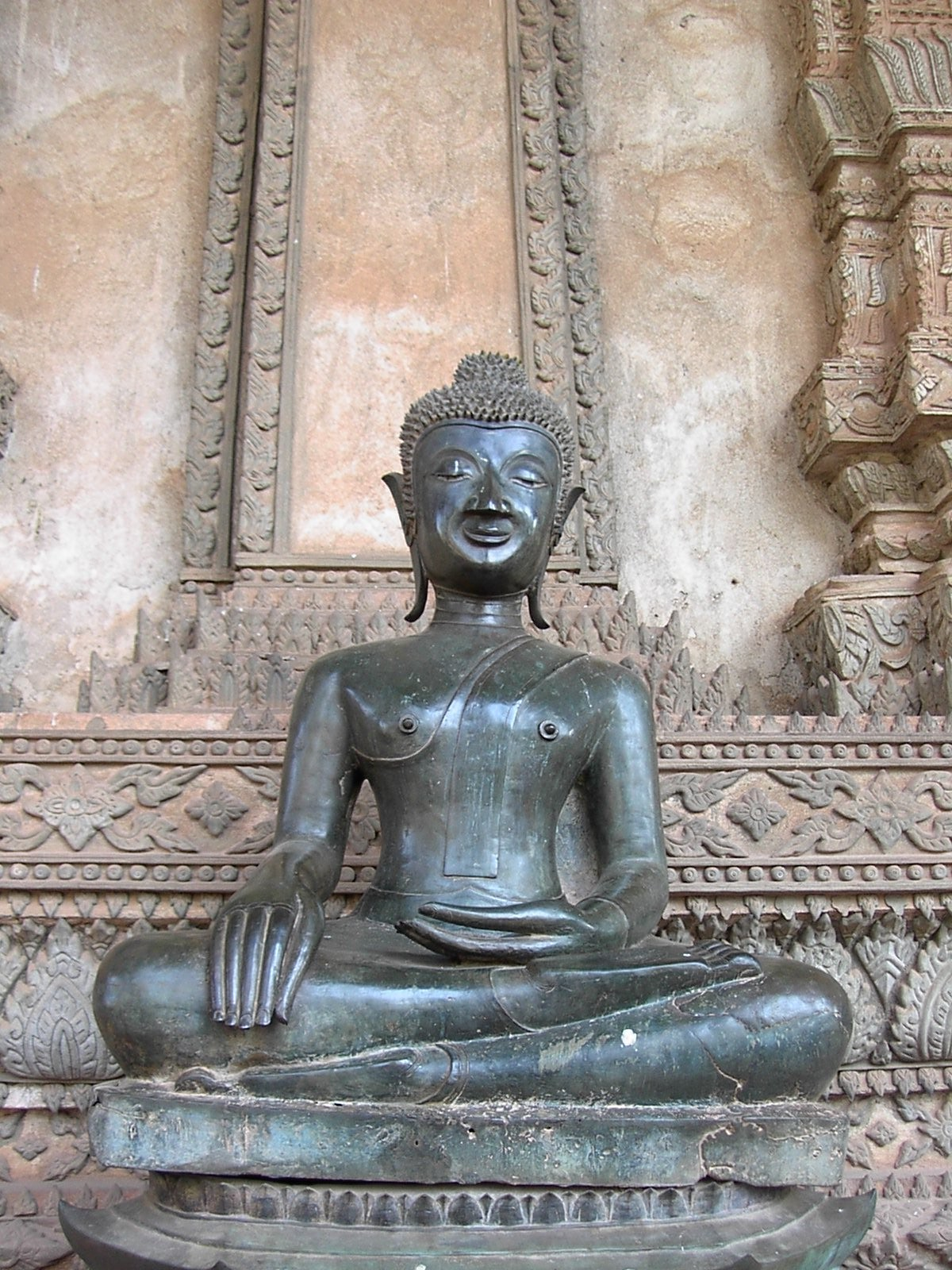
Budha performing bhūmisparsa mudrā position. Ho Phra Kaeo temple, Vientiane, Laos

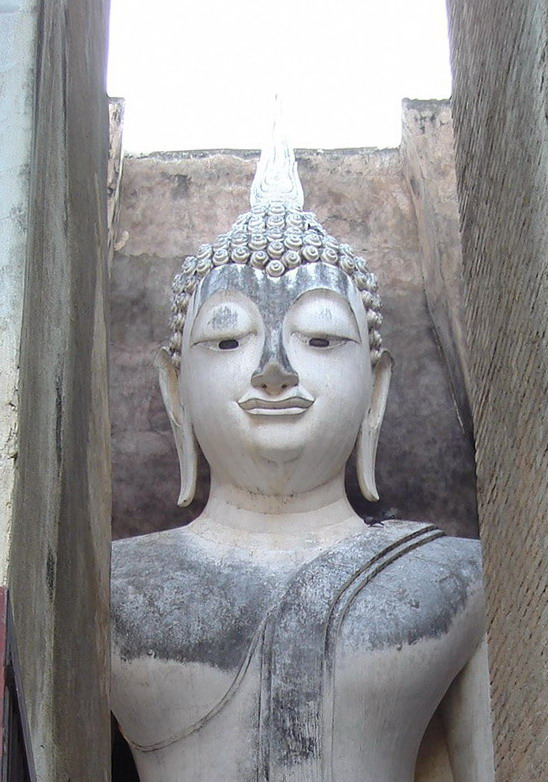
Phra Achana Buddha in Wat Sichum, 13th century Sukhothai, Thailand

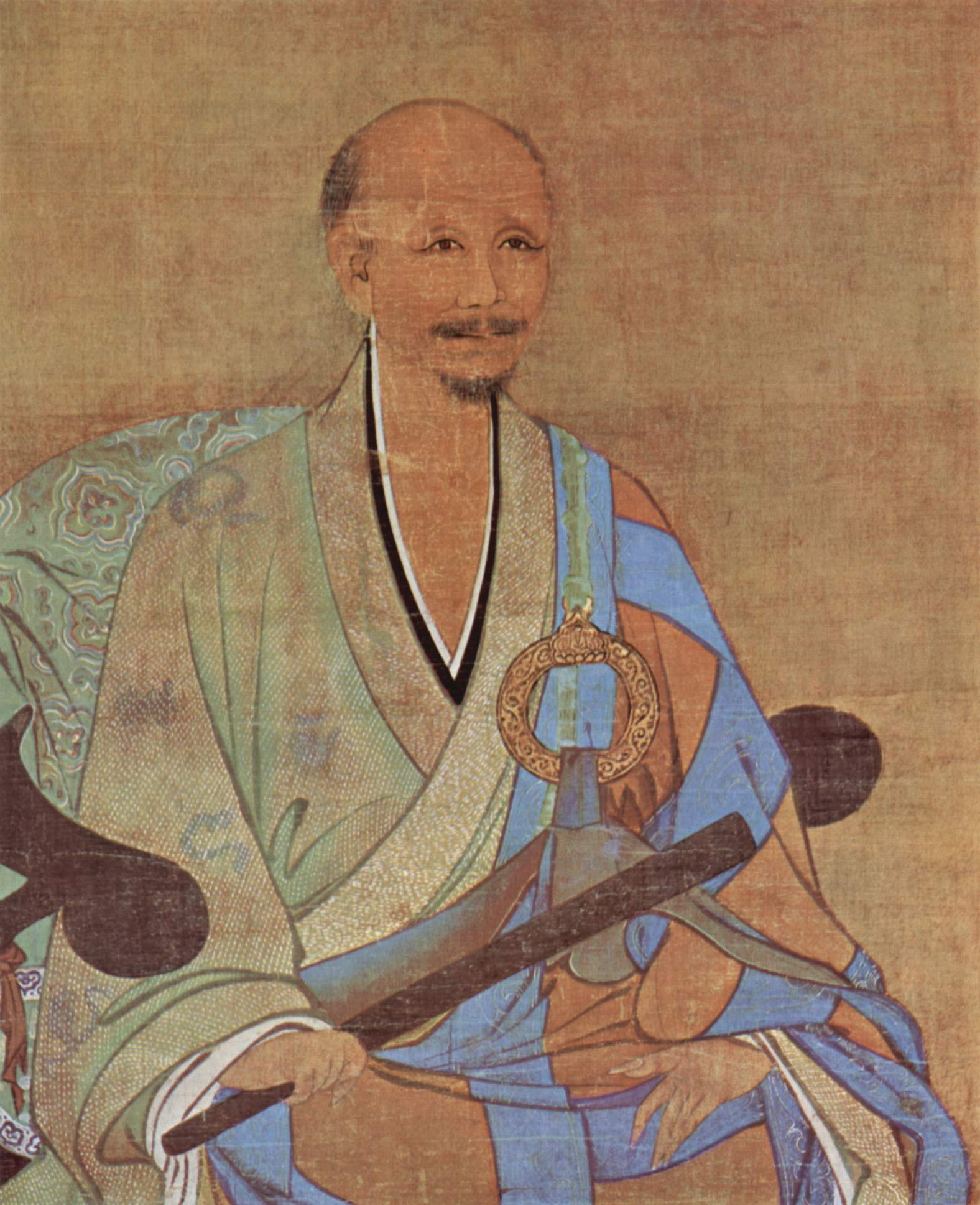
Chinese Zen Buddhist Wuzhun Shifan, 1238 AD, Song dynasty

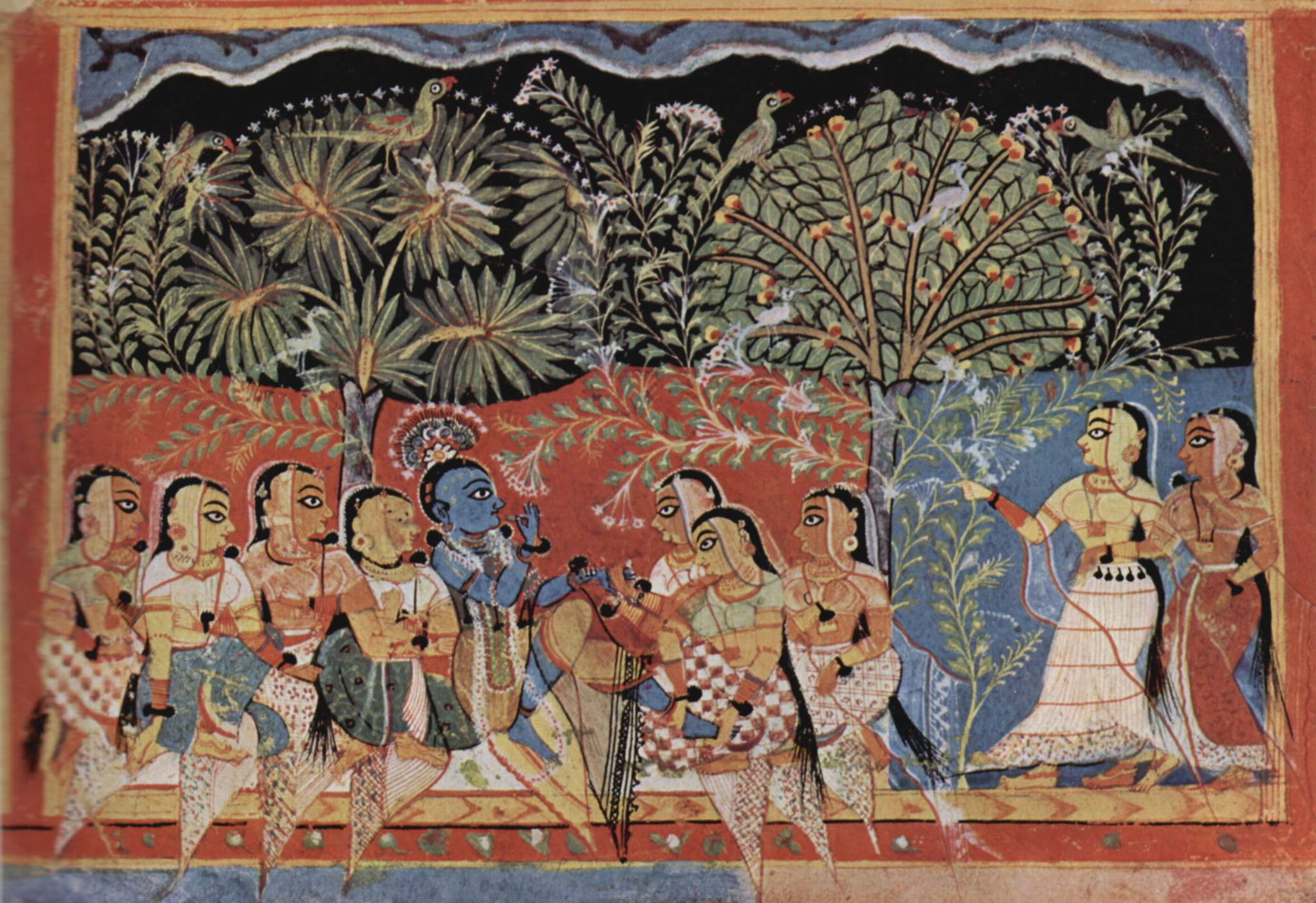
Gita Govinda manuscript c. 1500, Prince of Wales Museum, Bombay, India

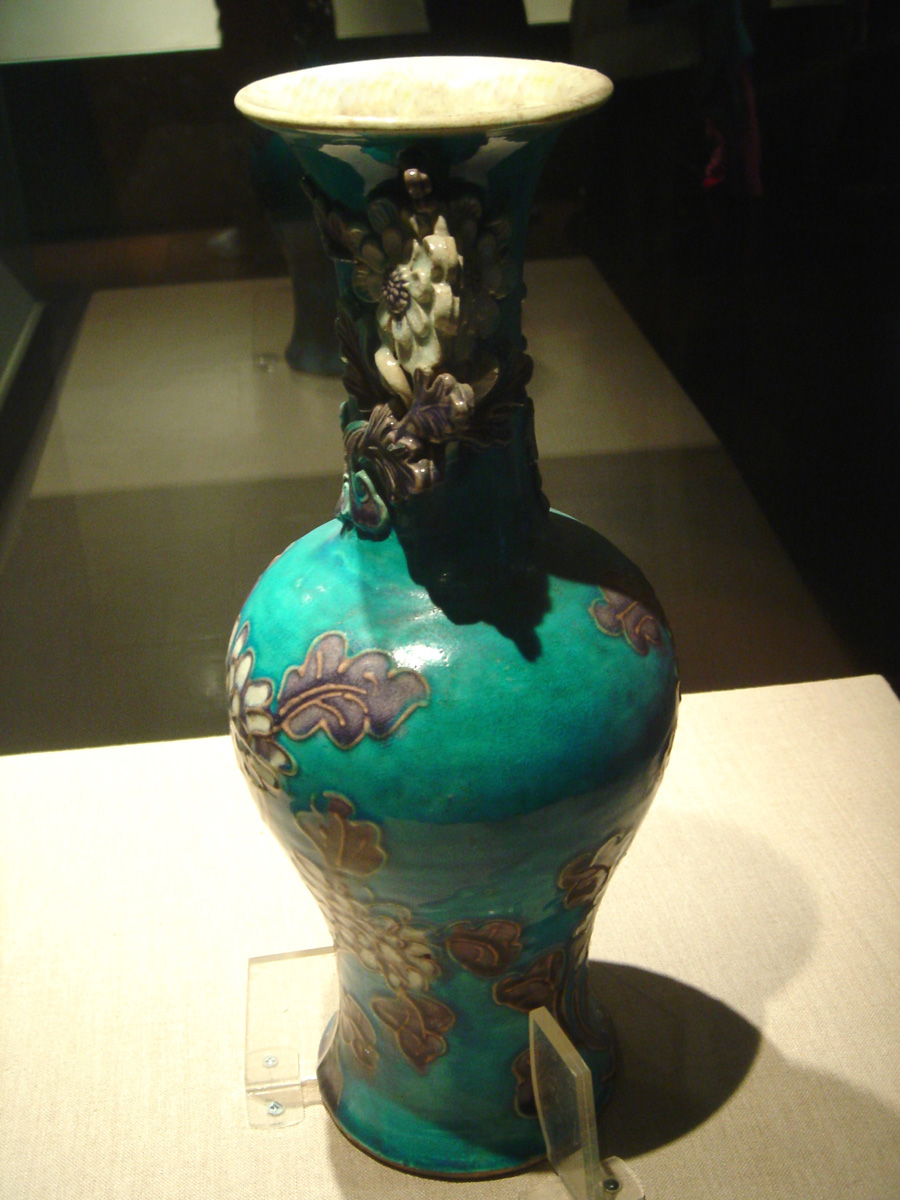
Chrysanthemum styled porcelain vase, Ming dynasty, 1368–1644 AD, Chinese

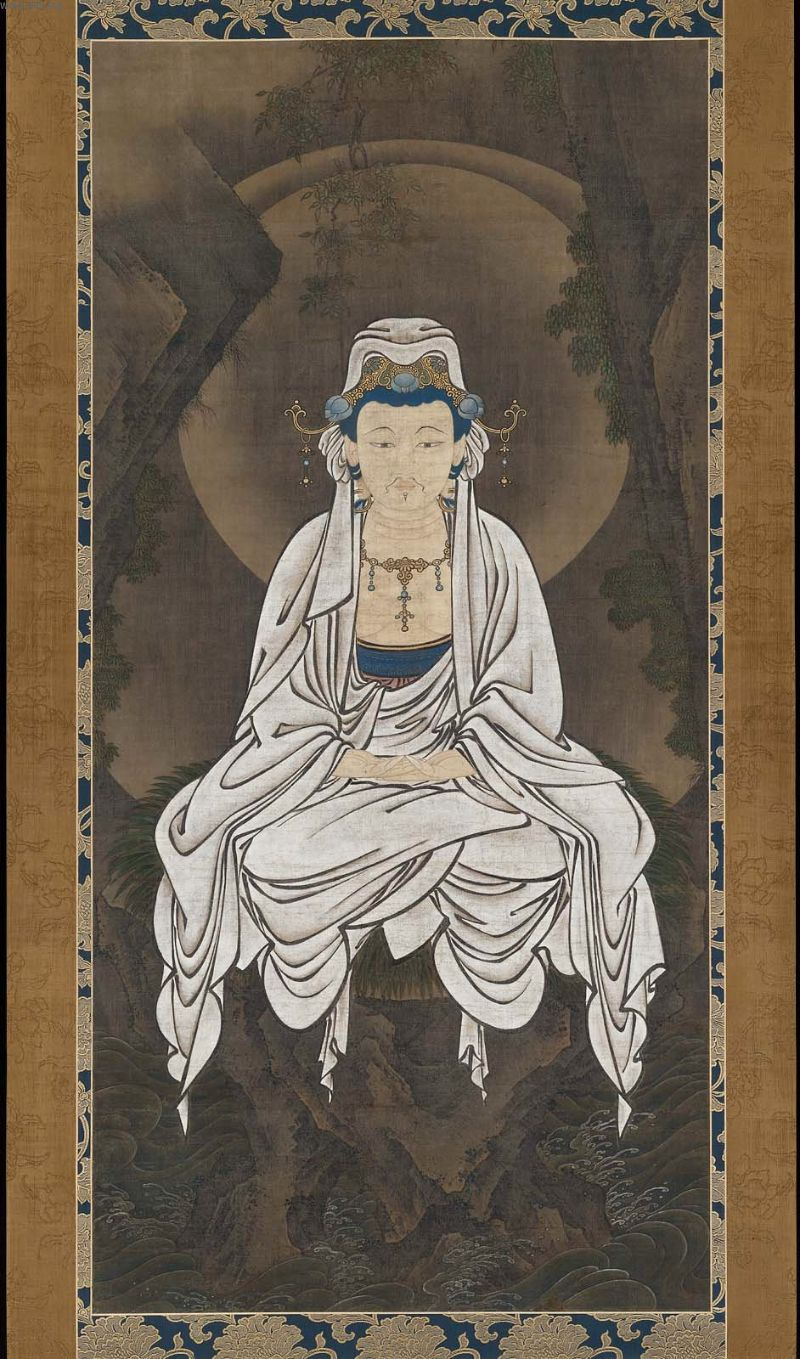
A White-Robed Kannon, Bodhisattva of Compassion, Kanō Motonobu (1476–1559), Japanese

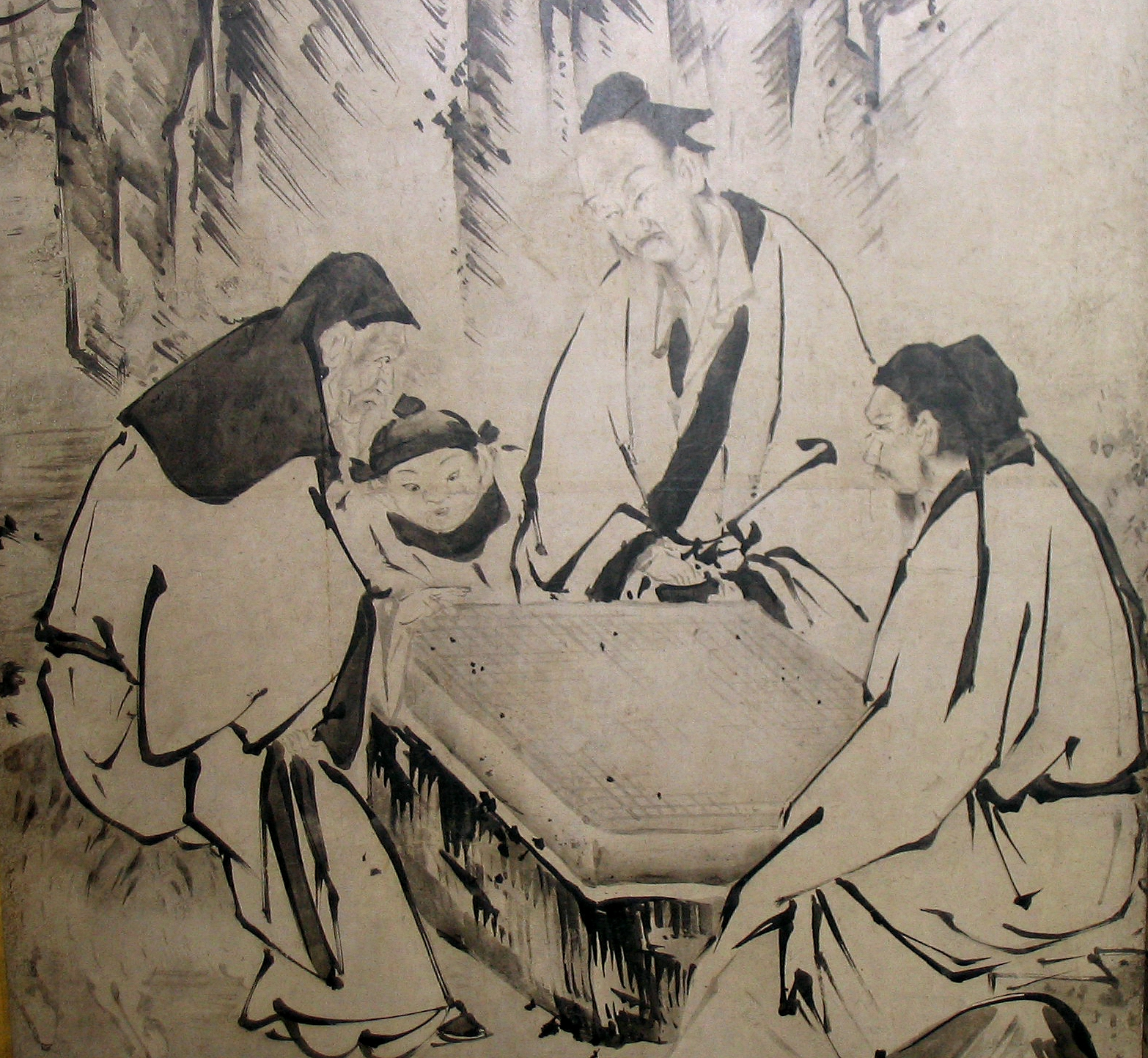
A screen painting depicting people playing Go, Kanō Eitoku (1543–1590), Japanese

Right panel of the Pine Trees screen (松林図 屏風, Shōrin-zu byōbu) by Hasegawa Tōhaku (1539–1610), Japanese

Genji Monogatari, Tosa Mitsuoki, (1617–1691), Japanese

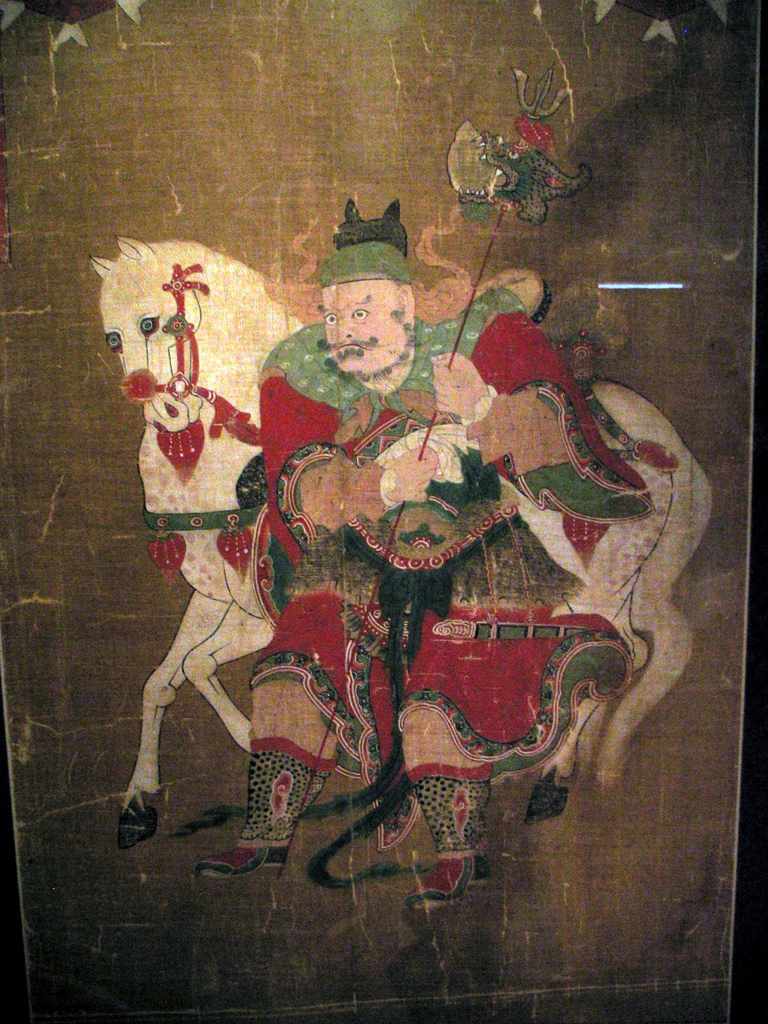
An underworld messenger, Joseon dynasty, Korean

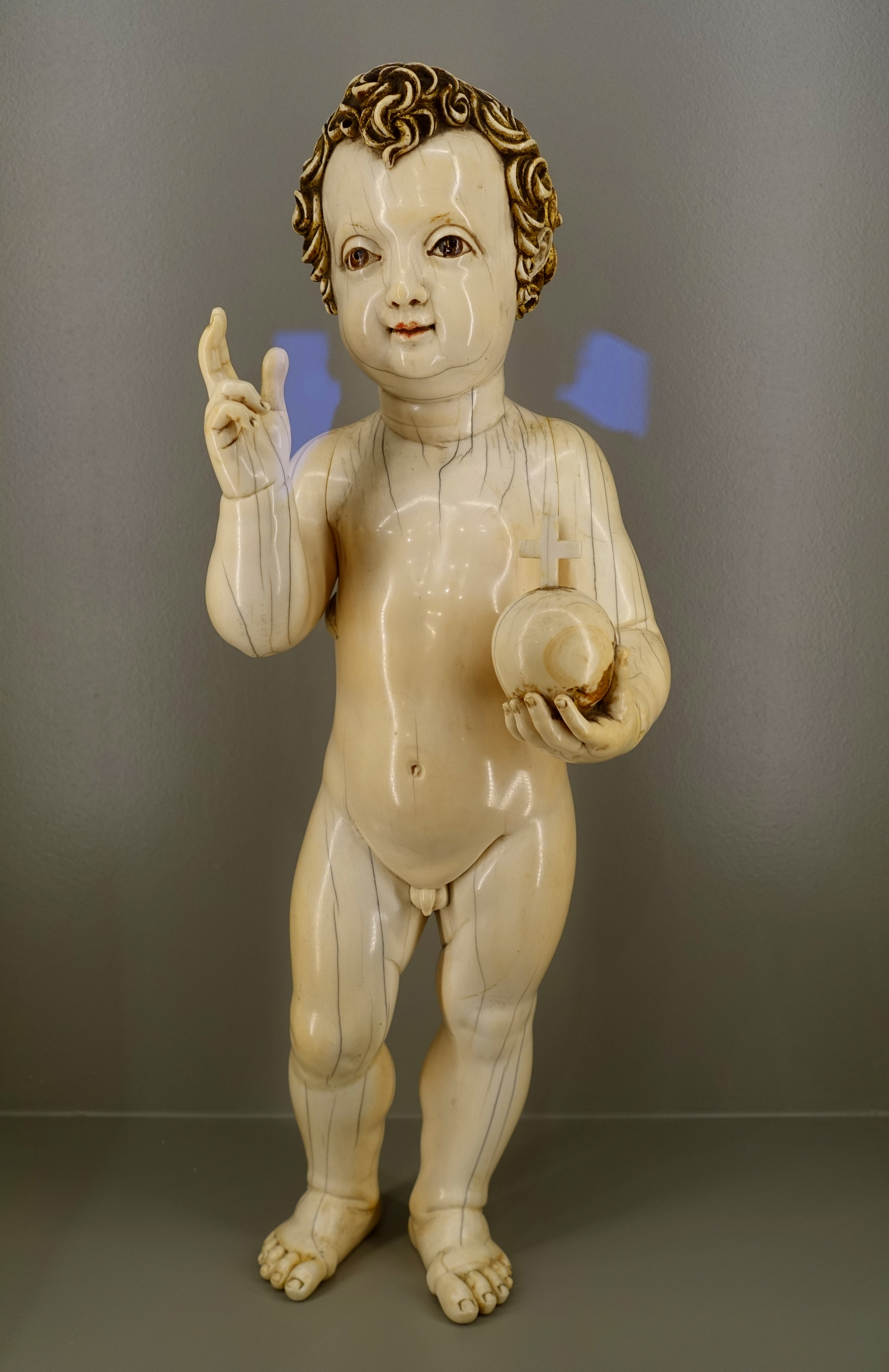
Ivory carving of Christ Child with gold paint (c. 1580–1640), Philippines

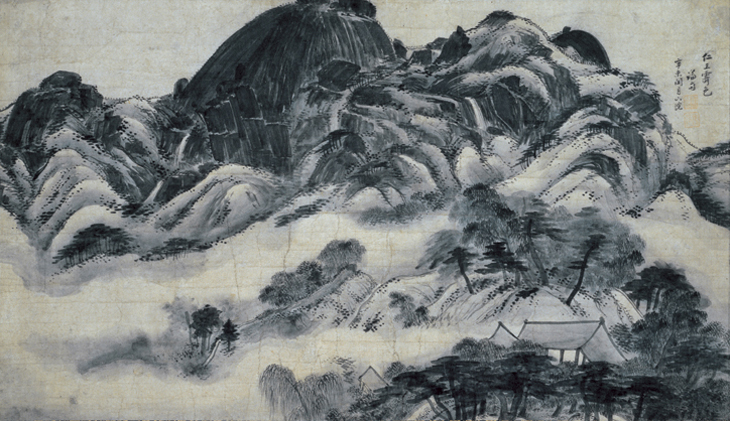
After Rain at Mt. Inwang, Cheong Seon (1676–1759), Korean

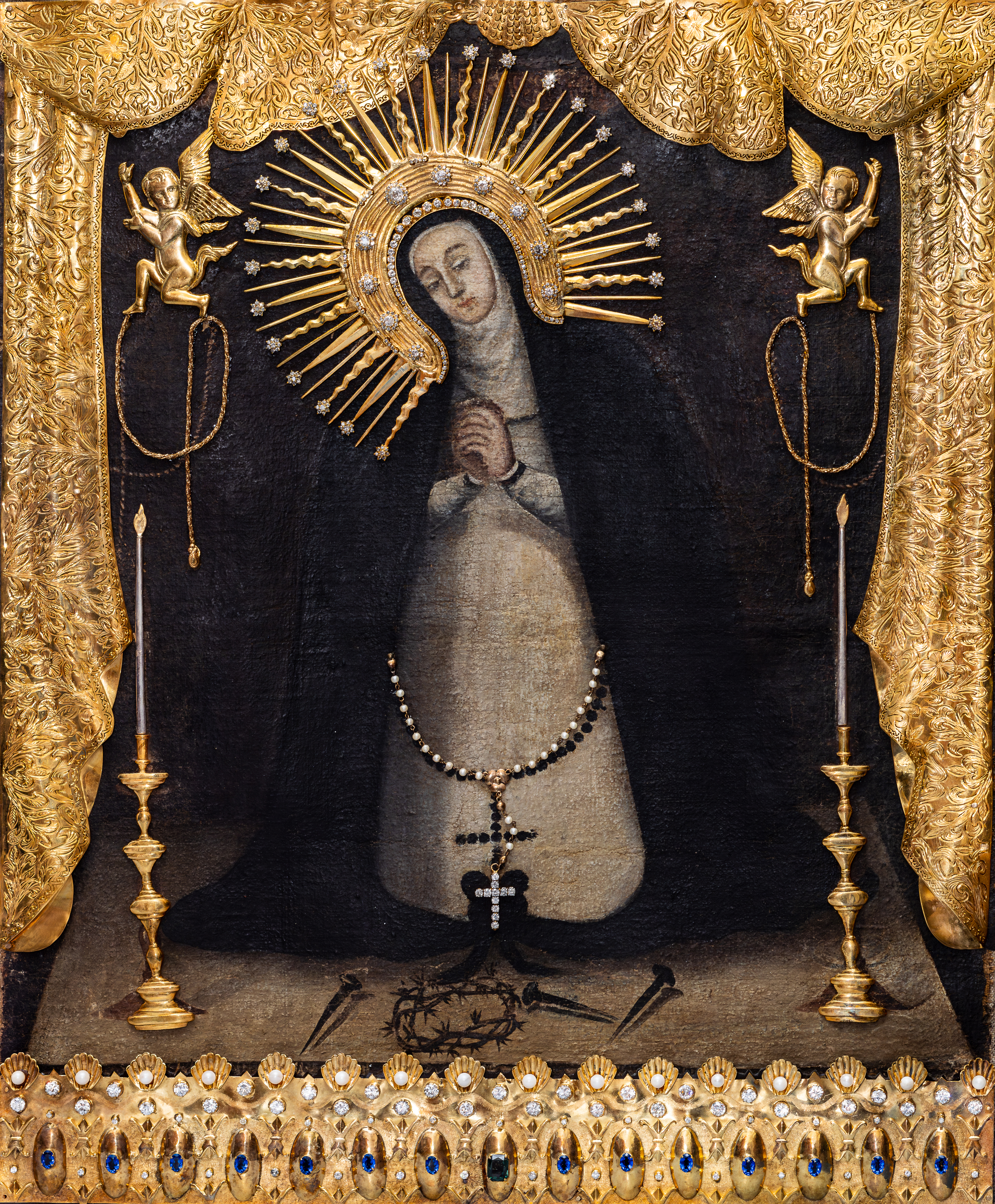
Nuestra Señora de la Soledad de Porta Vaga (c.1692), Philippines

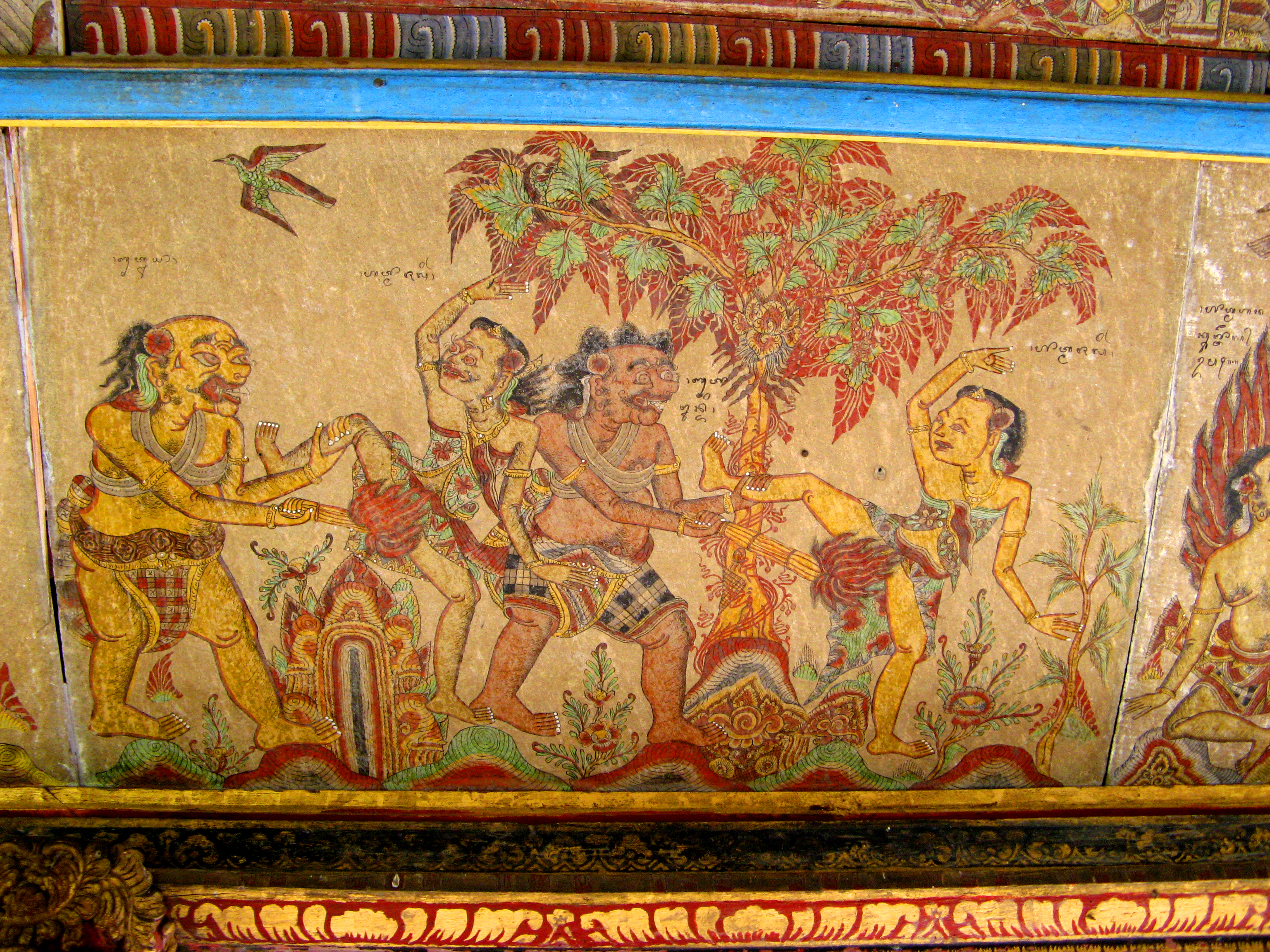
Hell scene on Kertha Gosa Pavilion, Balinese art, circa 18th century, Indonesia

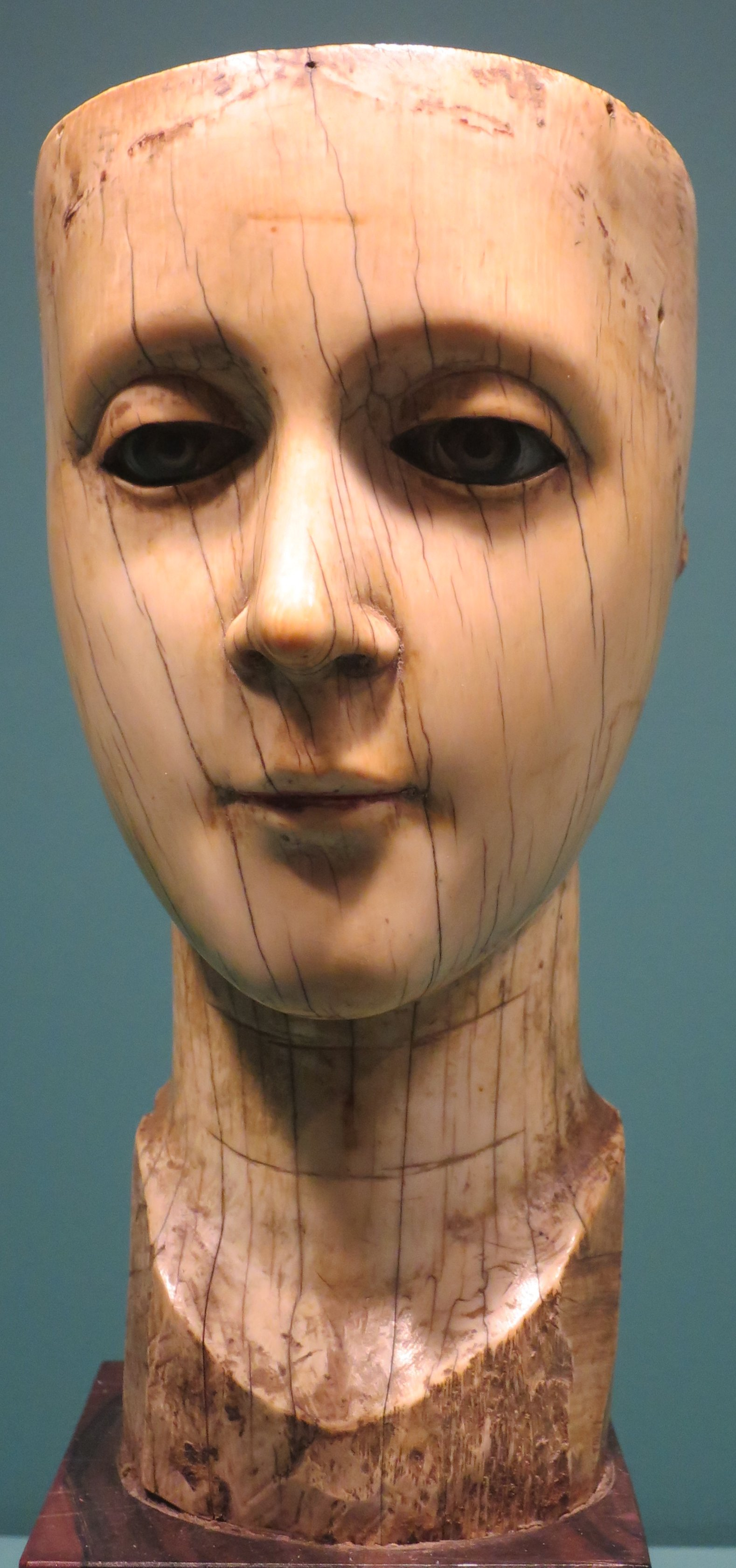
Virgin Mary ivory head with inlaid glass eyes (18-19th century), Philippines

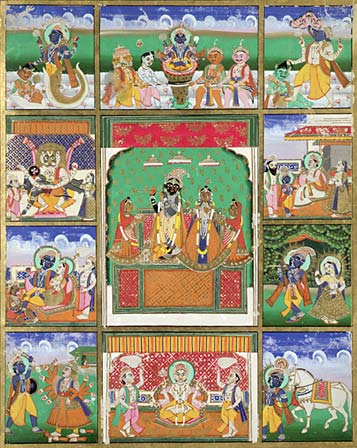
The 10 Avatars of Vishnu, c. 19th century India

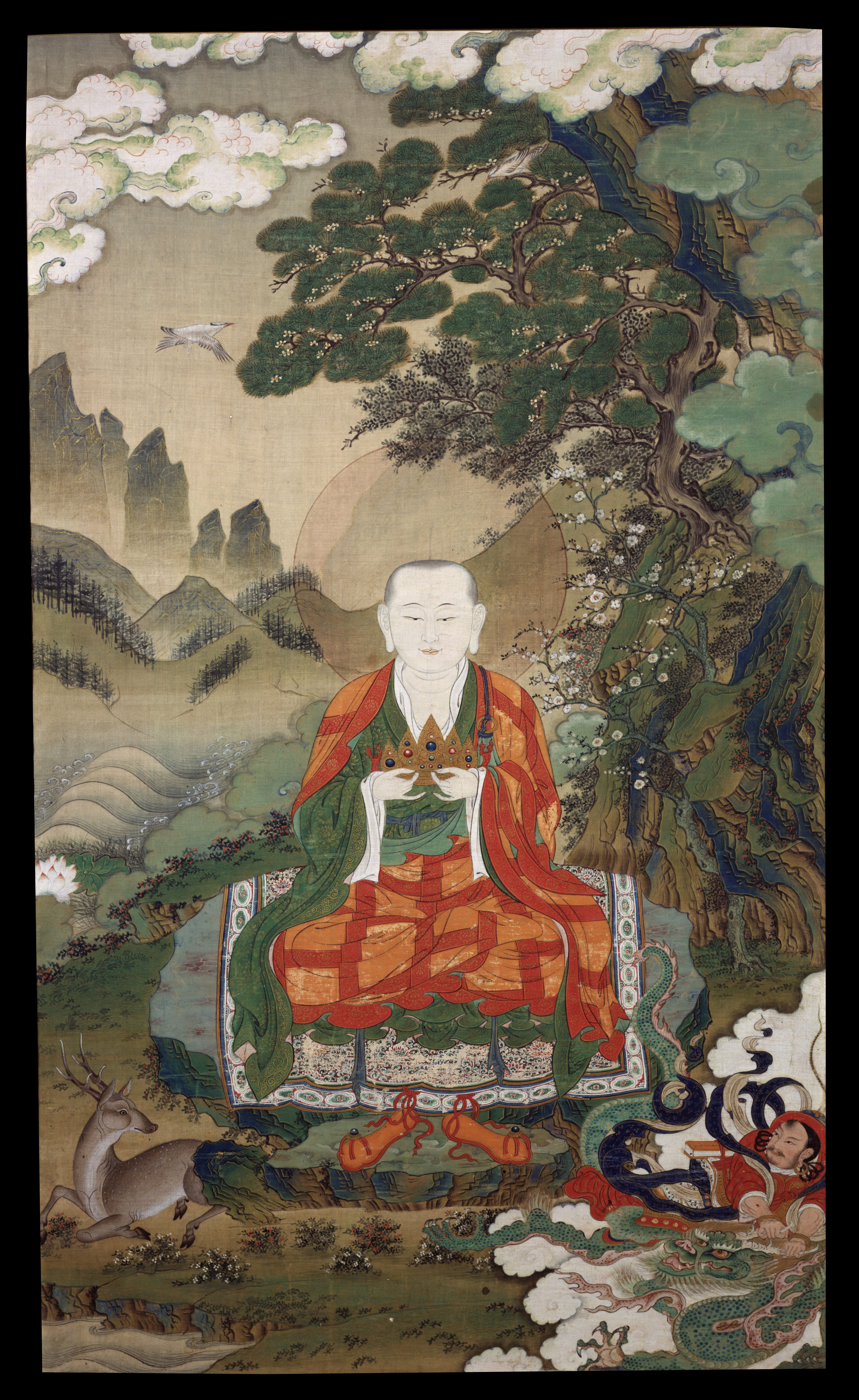
Rahula (Tibet, 16th century)

== See also ==
- History of Asia

=== Specific topics in Asian art ===
- Category:Arts in Asia by country
- Night in paintings (Eastern art)
- Scythian art
- History of Chinese art
- Culture of the Song dynasty
- Ming dynasty painting
- Tang dynasty art
- Lacquerware
- Mandala
- Emerald Buddha
- Urushi-e
- Gautama Buddha
- Buddhism and Hinduism
- List of National Treasures of Japan (paintings)
- List of National Treasures of Japan (sculptures)

=== General art topics ===
- History of painting
- Landscape painting
