= Historiography of France =

The historiography of France examines how historians have interpreted and written about French history over time, reflecting shifting political, cultural, and intellectual contexts. It can refer to the different ways that French and foreign historians have perceived French history, the role that perceptions of history have played in French politics and wider culture or the historiographical schools, such as the Annales School, which started or developed in France.

During the Ancien Régime, historical writing often served dynastic or religious purposes, exemplified by court historians and church chroniclers who promoted the monarchy and Catholic orthodoxy. The Enlightenment introduced a critical shift, with thinkers like Voltaire and Montesquieu seeking to explain historical change through a more secular analysis.

The French Revolution and the early to mid nineteenth century saw more nationalist narratives with the growth of an enduring national myth with historians such as Jules Michelet elevating historical figures such as Joan of Arc and Charles Martel. There was also a debate on the French Revolution both inside and outside France that in the Nineteenth Century tended to mostly reflect the political divide at the time with conservatives condemning the revolution, liberals praising the revolution of 1789 and radicals praising the revolution of 1793.

The late nineteenth century saw the growing influence of the scholarly German style of historiography with a careful attention to source documents with the founding of the Catholic Revue des questions historiques in 1866 and ten years later the Protestant and republican Revue historique which championed the École méthodique.

The 20th century marked a profound transformation in French historiography, driven by methodological innovation and a shift in historical focus. The most influential development was the rise of the Annales School, founded by Marc Bloch and Lucien Febvre in 1929, which broke with traditional narrative history centered on political events and "great men." Instead, it emphasized long-term social structures, economic patterns, and the use of interdisciplinary tools from sociology, geography, and anthropology. The school's second generation, particularly Fernand Braudel, revolutionized historical thought with his concept of the longue durée, exemplified in his seminal work The Mediterranean and the Mediterranean World in the Age of Philip II (1949), which examined history on civilizational rather than event-based timelines. Post-war historians such as Georges Duby, Emmanuel Le Roy Ladurie and Pierre Nora expanded these approaches by integrating mentalities, climate data, and collective memory into historical analysis.

Particularly well debated subjects include the Paris Commune, the Battle of France, and the Vichy regime

== See also ==
- Nouvelle histoire
- Histoire/Geschichte

== Sources ==
- Brown, Frederick (Autumn 2012). "The Battle for Joan". The Hudson Review. 65 (3). The Hudson Review, Inc.: 439–452. JSTOR 43489248.
- Burguière, André (2003). "L'historiographie des origines de la France. Genèse d'un imaginaire national". Annales. Histoire, Sciences Sociales (in French). 58 (1): 41–62. doi:10.1017/S0395264900002560.
- Fossier, François (July–September 1985). "A propos du titre d'historiographe sous l'Ancien Régime". Revue d'histoire moderne et contemporaine (in French). 32 (3): 361–417. doi:10.3406/rhmc.1985.1325.
- Jackson, Peter (1 November 2004). "Returning to the fall of France: Recent work on the causes and consequences of the 'strange defeat' of 1940". Modern & Contemporary France. 12 (4). Taylor & Francis: 513–536. doi:10.1080/0963948042000284768. ISSN 0963-9489. OCLC 4558271900. S2CID 143996483.
- Guillaume, Lancereau (2021). "Unruly Memory and Historical Order: The Historiography of the French Revolution between Historicism and Presentism (1881-1914)" (PDF). História da Historiografia: International Journal of Theory and History of Historiography. 14 (36): 225–256. doi:10.15848/hh.v14i36.1682.
- Michelet, Jules (1867). Histoire de France.
- Montesquieu (1748). The Spirit of Law. Vol. I (1 ed.).
- Voltaire (1759). An Essay on Universal History, the Manners, and Spirit of Nations. Vol. 1.
- Wood, Ian (2013). The Modern Origins of the Early Middle Ages. Oxford University Press. ISBN 9780199650484.
