= Revue des questions historiques =

Historical journal published in France (1866–1939)

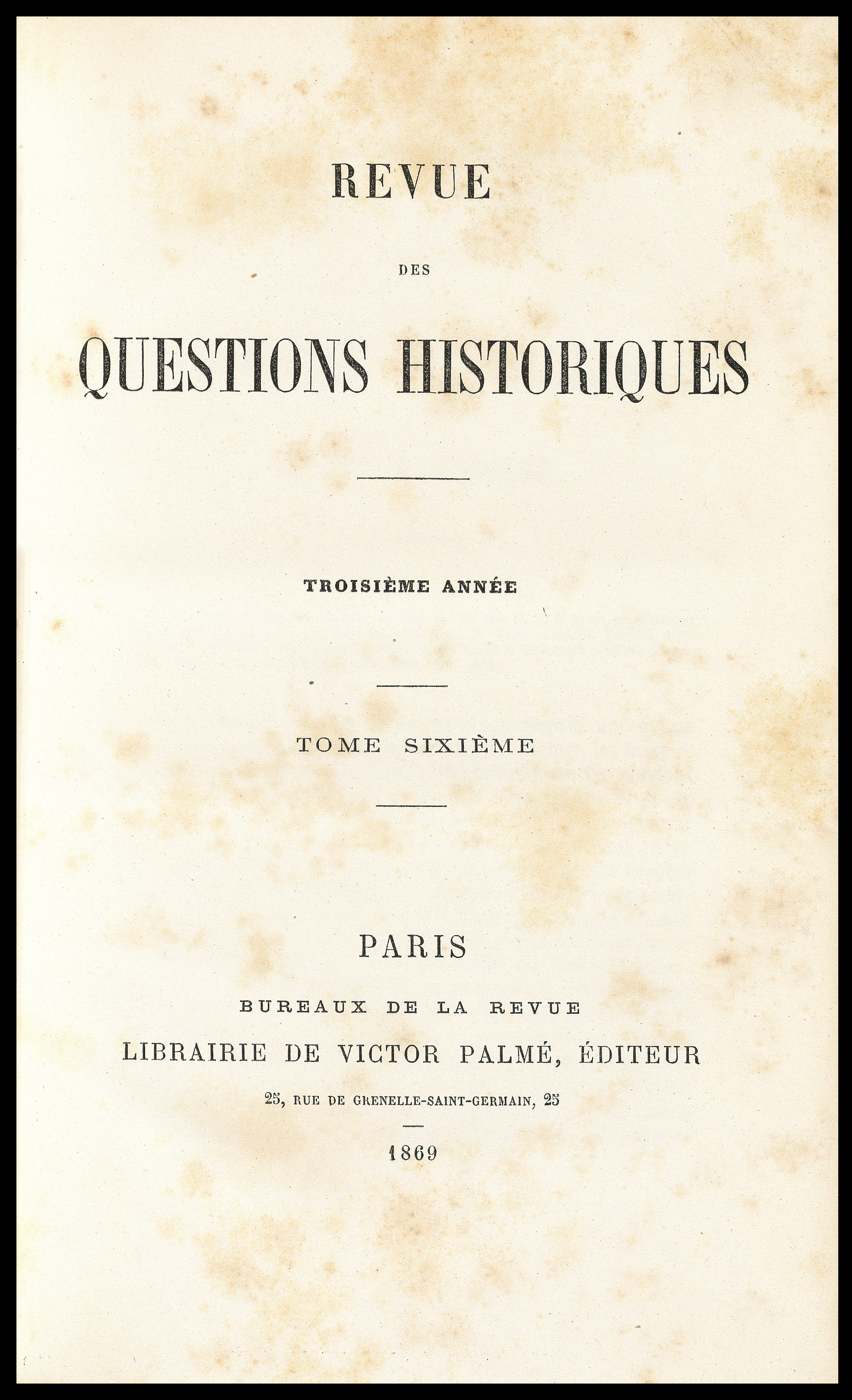
- Discipline: History
- Language: French

Publication details
- History: 1866–1939
- Publisher: Victor Palmé (France)
- Frequency: Quarterly
- Open access: Yes

Standard abbreviations
- ISO 4: Rev. Quest. Hist.

Links
- Catalog entry on Gallica – Link to issues available online (1866–1937); Commons category

The Revue des questions historiques (Review of Historical Questions, RQH) was the first scholarly journal published in France or the French language and was the first French historical journal to systematically employ the new German methods of historic research.

== Foundation ==
The historical journal was established in July 1866 by the Marquis Gaston du Fresne de Beaucourt, Marius Sepet and Léon Gautier and published by Victor Palmé, and with an early editorial team of young former students from the École des Chartes. It was based on the careful German historical methods of Historische Zeitschrift with a commitment to careful study of primary sources.

It was a conservative and ultramontane journal, originally an offshoot of the ultramontane Revue du monde catholique, and a part of a wider French Catholic intellectual movement in the late nineteenth century, part of an interlocking network of Catholic oriented scholarly journals. Although it has been placed in the context of a "Catholic reconquista" of French culture there was also a programme of getting Catholics, particularly the clergy, to engage in wider scholarship rather than defensively retreating within the sphere of the church as well as improving the scholarly standards of Catholic history writing. However the Revue was overwhelmingly lay, with only three priests among the 35 most frequent contributors of the first decade.

== The rival Revue historique ==
In direct reaction, Gabriel Monod set up Revue historique a decade later, citing Revue des questions historiques as his inspiration in the Revue Historique's first issue, copying its format, structure and volume while at the same time criticising its Catholicism. There was an almost total lack of crossover of writers between the two journals which foreshadowed by 20 years the division of academics over the Dreyfus affair, although the founder of Revue historique, Gustave Charles Fagniez, did eventually write for the older journal after resigning from the journal he helped found due to its anti-clerical stances. The Revue historique has been seen by some historians as being particularly republican and Protestant in its early years as a reaction.

Some historians contend that this duel still persists after the demise of RQH, with historiography accounts unwilling to concede the pioneering work of the Revue des questions historiques due to an ideological preference for the political stances of the Revue historique.

== Outreach ==
In 1867, a bibliographical society was founded as "an intellectual center where good people could gather," in reaction to the secular Ligue de l'enseignement. In 1868, the bibliographical society started publishing the popular monthly literary Revue de bibliographie universelle, better known as Polybiblion, to reach out beyond the historical profession to the educated middle class whose board had many common directors with the Revue.

The Bibliographical Society was responsible for the "Catholic Worker's Library", or the "25 Centime Library", which was an attempt to combat similar radical and Protestant efforts and finally there were four-page tracts on various topics, about two million copies of which had been distributed in the first two years. Unlike the Revue, these were reactions to existing Protestant and radical initiatives.

== Historical influence ==
In 1867, the Vatican historian Henri de l'Epinois, who was also on the editorial board of the Revue, used the Revue to publish the Roman Inquisition's documents on the trials of Galileo.

The journal is seen by some historians as a precursor to Action Française, and Victor Nguyen has shown that the counter-revolutionary ideas of the young Charles Maurras were influenced in part by the Revue's article Le procès de la révolution française.

== Twentieth century ==
Later editors included Paul Allard and Jean Guiraud. It was seen as a platform for legitimist scholarship into the twentieth century.

Publication was suspended in 1915, but relaunched in 1922 by the Action Française journalist and politician Roger Lambelin and continued until 1939. During the twentieth century, it gradually changed from its original aristocratic and grassroots legitimism to being an intellectual journal for the activist and Orleanist Action Française.

== Sources ==
- Audren, Frédéric (2008). "La belle époque des juristes catholiques (1880–1914)". Revue française d'histoire des idées politiques (in French). 28 (2): 233–271. doi:10.3917/rfhip.028.0233.
- Berstein, Serge (1995). "Action française, histoire et historiens". In Berstein, Serge; Milza, Pierre (eds.). Le Goût de l'histoire (in French). Presses universitaires du Septentrion. pp. 91–102. ISBN 978-2-7574-2123-9.
- den Boer, Pim (2011). "Historical Writing in France, 1800–1914". In Macintyre, Stuart (ed.). The Oxford History of Historical Writing: Volume 4: 1800–1945. Oxford University Press. pp. 184–203. doi:10.1093/acprof:osobl/9780199533091.003.0010. ISBN 978-0-19-953309-1.
- Cabanel, Patrick (January–March 1994). "L'institutionnalisation des « sciences religieuses » en France (1879–1908): Une entreprise protestante?". Bulletin de la Société de l'Histoire du Protestantisme Français (1903–2015). 140. Librairie Droz: 33–80. JSTOR 24297675.
- Carbonell, Charles-Olivier (1976a). "La naissance de la Revue historique. Une revue de combat (1876–1885)". Revue historique (in French). 225 (2): 331–51. ISSN 0035-3264. JSTOR 40953091. OCLC 9972916335.
- Carbonell, Charles-Olivier (1976b). "Chapitre II. Une école catholique : l'historiographie providentialiste, ultramontaine et légitimiste de la Revue des Questions historiques". Histoire et historiens : une mutation idéologique des historiens français : 1865-1885 (in French). Toulouse: Privat. pp. 325–399. ISBN 978-2-7089-3900-4.
- Carbonell, Charles-Olivier (1978). "L'histoire dite « positiviste » en France". Romantisme (in French). 8 (21–22): 173–185. doi:10.3406/roman.1978.5216. "Fait partie d'un numéro thématique : Les positivismes"
- Clerke, Agnes Mary (1911). "Galileo Galilei" . In Chisholm, Hugh (ed.). Encyclopædia Britannica (11th ed.). Cambridge University Press.
- Corpet, Olivier (1992). "La revue". In Sirinelli, Jean-François (ed.). Histoire des droites en France. Tome 2 : Cultures (in French). Paris: Gallimard. pp. 166–180.
- de l'Épinois, Henri (1 July 1867). "Galilée Son Procès, Sa Condamnation D'Après des Documents Inédits". Revue des questions historiques: 68–172.
- de l'Épinois, Henri (1866). Note sur les études historiques en France au XIXe siècle. Paris: C. Douniol. pp. viii-64.
- Julia, Dominique (2009). "L'historiographie religieuse en France depuis la Révolution française". In Julia, Dominique (ed.). Religion ou confession : Un bilan historiographique (in French). Éditions de la Maison des sciences de l’homme. pp. 9–55. ISBN 978-2-7351-1965-3.
- Grondeux, Jérôme [in French] (2014). "Un essai de science historique catholique : Jean Guiraud et la Revue des questions historiques". In Boudon, Jacques-Olivier (ed.). De l'École française de Rome au journal La Croix : Jean Guiraud, polémiste chrétien. Collection de l'École française de Rome (in French). Vol. 497. Rome: École française de Rome. pp. 313–327. ISBN 978-2-7283-0890-3. OCLC 905553162.
- Guilbaud, Juliette (2014). "Historische Zeitschriften in Frankreich". Revue de l'IFHA (in German). HS. Translated by Philipp Siegert. Institut français d'histoire en Allemagne. doi:10.4000/ifha.7886.
- Healy, Patrick J. (1913). "Paul Allard" . In Herbermann, Charles (ed.). Catholic Encyclopedia. New York: Robert Appleton Company.
- Lancereau, Guillaume (14 June 2021). "À qui parlent les historiens? Érudition, diffusion et polarisation politique dans l'historiographie de la Révolution française (1870–1930)". Politika (in French).
- Larcher, Laurent (June 1997). "Radiographie de la Revue des questions historiques". La Revue des revues (23).
- Larousse, P (1890). "Revue du monde catholique". Grand dictionnaire universel du XIXe siècle. Vol. 13. Paris: Administration du Grand Dictionnaire Universel.
- Lukacs, John (Spring 1977). "Review: Professional History As Myth". Salmagundi (37): 155–160. JSTOR 40547080.
- Mazel, Henri (1 July 1886). "Le Procès de la Révolution française". Revue des questions historiques: 95–164.
- Monod, Gabriel (1 January 1876). "Introduction du progrès des études historiques en France depuis le XVIe siècle". Revue historique. I: 5–38.
- Mucchielli, Laurent (January 1995). "Aux origines de la « Nouvelle Histoire » en France : l'évolution intellectuelle et la formation du champ des sciences sociales (1880–1930)". Revue de synthèse. 116 (1): 55–98. doi:10.1007/BF03181267.
- Nguyen, Victor (1991). Rancœur, René (ed.). Aux origines de l'Action française : Intelligence et politique à l'aube du XX^{e} siècle. Pour une histoire du XX^{e} siècle (in French). Paris: Fayard. p. 958. ISBN 978-2-213-02658-9.
- Noronha-DiVanna, Isabel (2010). Writing History in the Third Republic. Cambridge Scholars. p. 111. ISBN 9781443820103.
- Offenstadt, Nicolas (2014). "Les historiens de l'Action française". In Gérard Noiriel (ed.). Comment écrire l'histoire des droites en France (in French). Villeneuve-d'Ascq: Presses universitaires du Septentrion. pp. 133–149. ISBN 978-2-7574-2123-9.
- Prévost, Jean-Pierre (1992). "La perception de l'historiographie allemande dans la Revue des Questions Historiques et la Revue Historique de 1865 à 1914". Revue d'Allemagne et des pays de langue allemande (in French). 24 (1): 89–100. doi:10.3406/alle.1992.2515 (inactive 1 July 2025).
- de Villiers, Marc (1929). "Roger Lambelin". Journal de la société des américanistes (in French). 21 (2): 409–410. doi:10.3406/jsa.1929.3682.
- Wilson, Stephen (1969). "The 'Action Française' in French Intellectual Life". The Historical Journal. 12 (2). Cambridge University Press: 328–350. doi:10.1017/S0018246X00004325. JSTOR 2637807.
