= École méthodique =

The École méthodique was a late 19th-century French historical school of thought that emphasized rigorous source criticism and scientific methods in the writing of history, closely associated with the Revue historique and historians such as Gabriel Monod and Charles Seignobos.
