= Historiography of the Battle of France =

Diagram of the Maginot Line

The historiography of the Battle of France describes how the German victory over French and British forces in the Battle of France had been explained by historians and others. (Note: For historiographical overviews see: Alexander (1990); Hoffman (1997); Cairns (1959); Cairns (1974); Jackson (2004); Vaïsse (2000).) Many people in 1940 found the fall of France unexpected and earth shaking. Alexander notes that Belgium and the Netherlands fell to the German army in a matter of days and the British were soon driven back to the British Isles,

But it was France's downfall that stunned the watching world. The shock was all the greater because the trauma was not limited to a catastrophic and deeply embarrassing defeat of her military forces – it also involved the unleashing of a conservative political revolution that, on 10 July 1940, interred the Third Republic and replaced it with the authoritarian, collaborationist Etat Français of Vichy. All this was so deeply disorienting because France had been regarded as a great power....The collapse of France, however, was a different case (a 'strange defeat' as it was dubbed in the haunting phrase of the Sorbonne's great medieval historian and Resistance martyr, Marc Bloch).

— M.S. Alexander

== Contemporary comment ==
While the French armies were being defeated, the government turned to elderly warriors from the First World War. At a time many civilians felt there must be a wicked conspiracy afoot, these new leaders blamed a leftist culture inculcated by the schools for the failure, a theme that has repeatedly appeared in conservative commentary since 1940. General Maxime Weygand said as he took over in May 1940, "What we are paying for is twenty years of blunders and neglect. It is out of the question to punish the generals and not the teachers who have refused to develop in the children the sense of patriotism and sacrifice." He also claimed that reserve officers who abandoned their units were the products of "teachers who were Socialists and not patriots". The new national dictator of Vichy France, Marshal Philippe Pétain, had his explanation: "Our defeat is punishment for our moral failures. The mood of sensual pleasure destroyed what the spirit of sacrifice had built up".

== Early studies ==
=== From Lemberg to Bordeaux (1941) ===
From Lemberg to Bordeaux: A German War Correspondent’s Account of Battle in Poland, the Low Countries and France, 1939–40 was written by Leo Leixner, a journalist and war correspondent. The book is a witness account of the battles that led to the fall of Poland and France. In August 1939, Leixner joined the Wehrmacht as a war reporter, was promoted to sergeant and in 1941 published his recollections. The book was originally issued by Franz Eher Nachfolger, the central publishing house of the Nazi Party.

=== Tanks Break Through! (1940) ===
Tanks Break Through! (Panzerjäger Brechen Durch!), written by Alfred-Ingemar Berndt, a journalist and close associate of propaganda minister Joseph Goebbels, is a witness account of the battles that led to the fall of France. When the 1940 attack was in the offing, Berndt joined the Wehrmacht, was sergeant in an anti-tank division and afterwards published his recollections. The book was originally issued by Franz Eher Nachfolger, the central publishing house of the Nazi Party, in 1940.

=== Strange Defeat (1940) ===
L'Etrange Defaite temoignage ecrit en 1940 (Strange Defeat: A Statement of Evidence Written in 1940) was an account written by the Medieval historian Marc Bloch and published posthumously in 1946. Bloch raised most of the issues historians have debated since and he blamed French leadership,

What drove our armies to disaster was the cumulative effect of a great number of different mistakes. One glaring characteristic is, however, common to all of them. Our leaders...were incapable of thinking in terms of a new war.

— Bloch

Guilt was widespread; Carole Fink wrote that Bloch

...blamed the ruling class, the military and the politicians, the press and the teachers, for a flawed national policy and a weak defense against the Nazi menace, for betraying the real France and abandoning its children. Germany had won because its leaders had better understood the methods and psychology of modern combat.

— Fink

=== French interpretations ===
Martin Alexander (2001) wrote that many early French writers followed Bloch, asking why the French people accepted and even welcomed the defeat of the Third Republic. In The French Defeat of 1940: Reassessments (1997), Stanley Hoffman, a Frenchman who taught political science at Harvard, wrote that there was no "1940 syndrome". The syndrome was a hypothetical counterpart to the "Vichy syndrome" described in the 1980s by Henry Rousso and with "colonial syndrome" caused by the exposure of French atrocities in Algeria. French historians had shown little interest in the military events from April to June 1940, being more interested in the consequences, particularly the establishment of the Vichy regime in July 1940. Overlooked accounts of the campaign by participants, portrayed brave, puzzled French soldiers but the definitive history of the war fought by the fighting men had yet to be written. Alexander called the British and French in 1940 "neighbouring nations conducting a war in parallel rather than as one unified endeavour" and wrote that the relationship between the national histories was similar, parallel myths and literatures had come about and continued sixty years on.

=== German interpretations ===
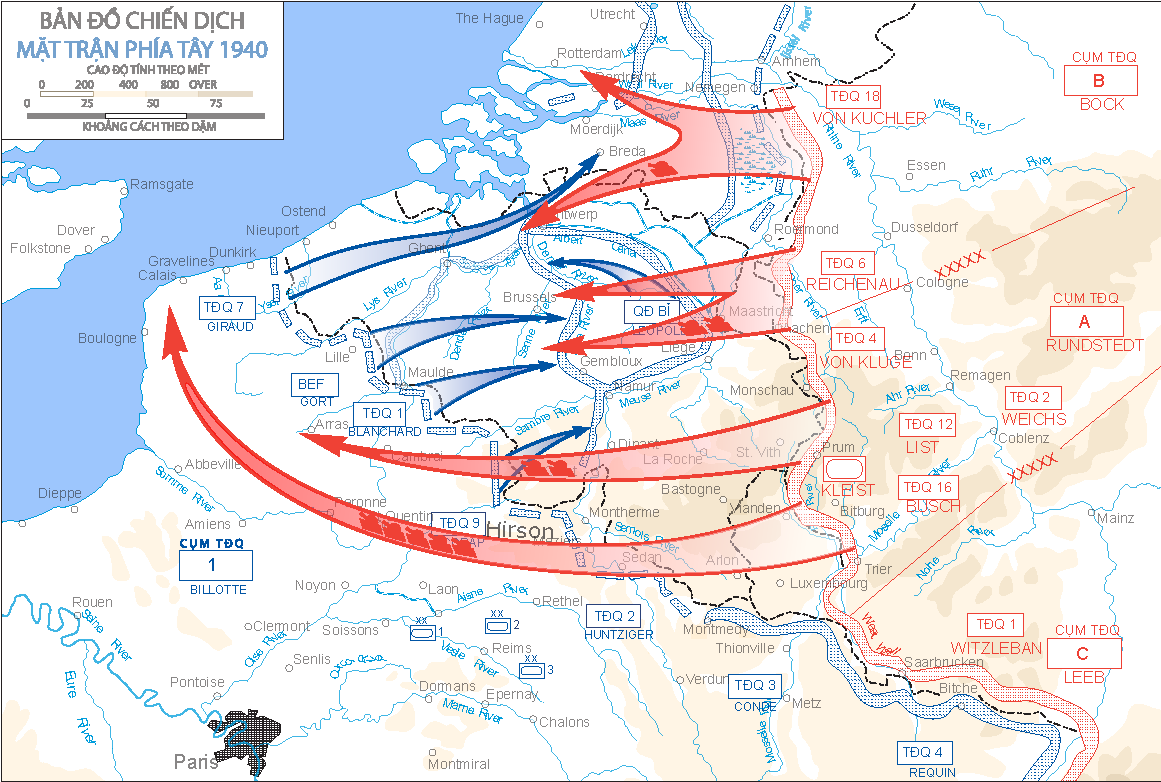
Map of Dyle Plan and Fall Gelb (Case Yellow)

Mungo Melvin (2001) wrote that German writing on the 1940 campaign sought answers to various questions,

How brilliant was the Manstein–Hitler operational idea, strategically? Was it realistic in its objectives to "force a decision on land", to crush the enemy and end the war in Germany's favour? Was the French defeat a foregone conclusion to German eyes? Would the defeat of the BEF on the sands of Dunkirk have decided the war in Germany's favour?

— Melvin

Melvin wrote that Germans writing in 1940 showed apprehension rather than confidence. German army officers were astonished by the swiftness of the victory, the French collapse and the British escape. Later historians have hindsight and British writers can make much of Dunkirk but German writers take the view that although it was a big operational and perhaps strategic blunder, this could not be blamed on a German failure to have formed a concept of the war; Dunkirk might not have been decisive but was a fatal blow to German strategy. Melvin called the German victory a "stunning operational success"; the Germans had exploited Allied mistakes and recovered from theirs, despite the tensions in the German high command.

=== Fuller (1956) ===
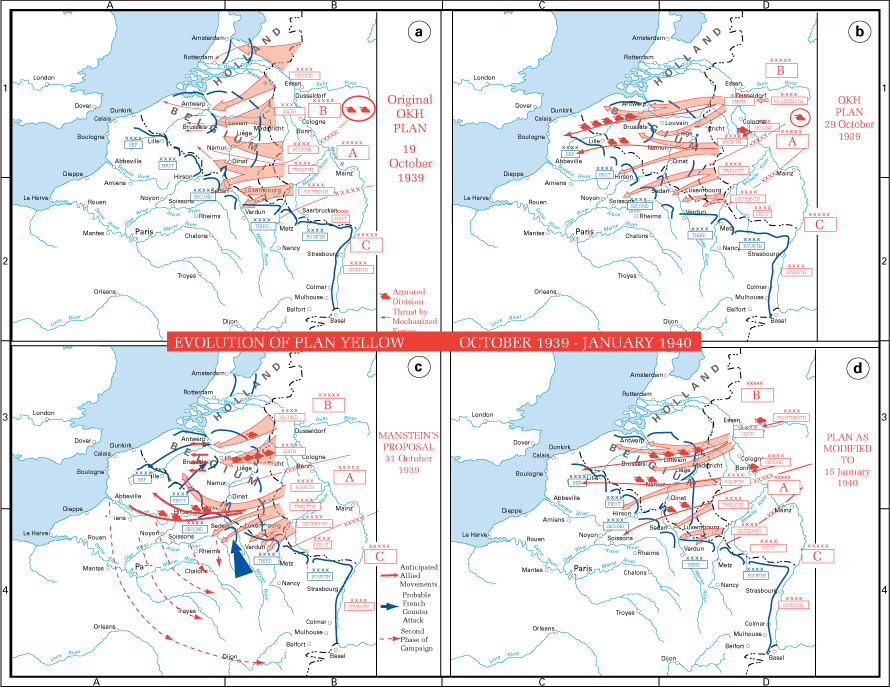
Maps showing the evolution of Fall Gelb (Case Yellow)

In 1956, the English historian J. F. C. Fuller called the military operations on the Meuse in 1940, "the Second Battle of Sedan". Fuller called the German operation an attack by paralyzation but Robert Doughty wrote that what some writers later called blitzkrieg had influenced few German officers, except for Guderian and Manstein and that the dispute between Guderian and Kleist that led Guderian to resign on 17 May, showed the apprehensions of the higher commanders about the "pace and vulnerability" of the XIX Panzer Corps. Doughty wrote that the development of the German plan suggested that sending armoured forces through the Ardennes was traditional Vernichtungsstrategie (strategy of annihilation), to encircle opposing forces and destroy them in a Kesselschlacht (cauldron battle). Weapons had changed but the methods were the same as those at Ulm (1805), Sedan (1870) and Tannenberg (1914).

Fuller had also written that the German army was an armoured battering-ram, covered by fighters and dive-bombers working as flying artillery, which broke through at several points. Doughty wrote that the XIX, XLI and XV Panzer corps had been the vanguard of the advance through the Ardennes but the most determined French resistance at Bodange, the mushroom of Glaire, Vendresse, La Horgne and Bouvellement, had been defeated by the combined attacks of infantry, artillery and tanks. The XIX Panzer Corps had only acted as a battering ram against the French covering forces in the Ardennes. Only long after 1940 was the importance of German infantry fighting and of combined operations south and to the south-west of Sedan recognised. Doughty also wrote that Fuller was wrong about the role of the Luftwaffe, which had not operated as flying artillery because German ground forces depended on conventional artillery. German bombing around Sedan on 13 May had managed to deplete the morale of the French 55th Division and ground attacks had helped to force on the ground advance but French bunkers were captured by hard infantry fighting, supported by direct-fire artillery and tanks, not destroyed by bombs; only two tanks of the French Second Army were reported destroyed by aircraft.

== Recent analyses ==
=== May (2000) ===
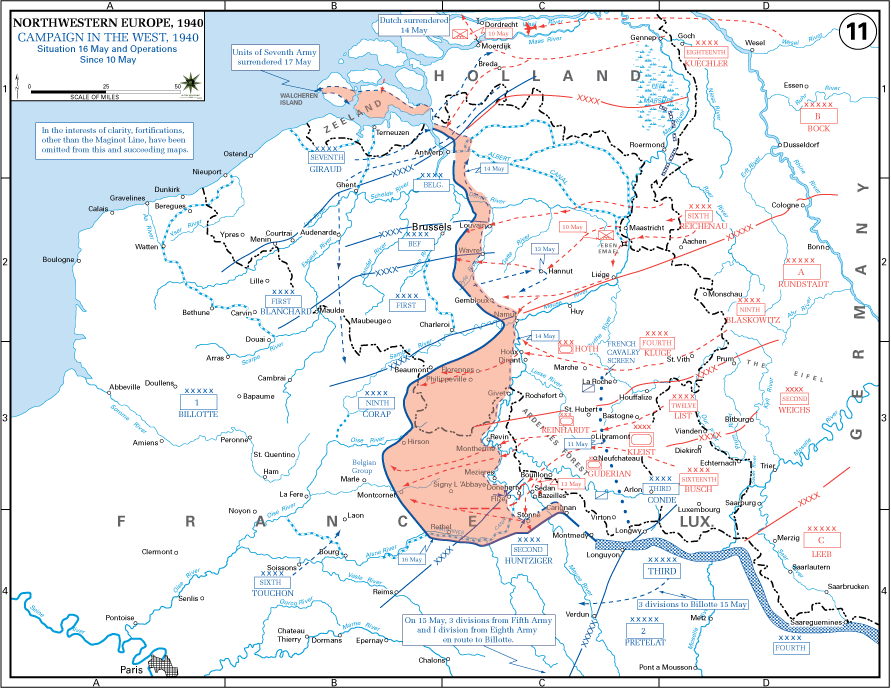
Situation on 16 May 1940

In 2000, American scholar Ernest R. May argued that Hitler had a better insight into the French and British governments than vice versa and knew that they would not go to war over Austria and Czechoslovakia, because he concentrated on politics rather than the state and national interest. From 1937 to 1940, Hitler stated his views on events, their importance and his intentions, then defended them against contrary opinion from the likes of Ludwig Beck, the German army chief of staff until August 1938 and Ernst von Weizsäcker the Staatssekretär (State Secretary, the deputy Foreign Minister). Hitler sometimes concealed aspects of his thinking but he was unusually frank about what came first and his assumptions. May referred to Wheeler-Bennett (1964),

Except in cases where he had pledged his word, Hitler always meant what he said.

— Wheeler-Bennett

and that in Paris, London and other capitals, there was an inability to believe that someone might want another world war. Given public reluctance to contemplate another war and a need to conciliate more centres of power, to reach consensus about Germany. The rulers of France and Britain were reticent, which limited dissent at the cost of enabling assumptions that suited their convenience. In France, French Prime Minister Daladier withheld information until the last moment, then presented the cabinet a fait accompli in September 1938 over the Munich Agreement, to avoid discussion over whether Britain would follow France into war or if the military balance was really in Germany's favour or how significant it was. The decision for war in September 1939 and the plan devised in the winter of 1939–1940 by Daladier for possible war with the Soviet Union, followed the same pattern.

Hitler miscalculated Franco-British reactions to the invasion of Poland in September 1939, because he had not realised that a watershed in public opinion had occurred in mid-1939. May also wrote that the French and British could have defeated Germany in 1938 with Czechoslovakia as an ally and also in late 1939, when German forces in the west were incapable of preventing a French occupation of the Ruhr, which would force a capitulation or a futile German resistance in a war of attrition. France did not invade Germany in 1939, because it wanted British lives to be at risk too and because of hopes that a blockade might force a German surrender without a bloodbath. The French and British also believed that they were militarily superior and guaranteed victory through the blockade or by desperate German attacks. The run of victories enjoyed by Hitler from 1938–1940, could only be understood in the context of defeat being inconceivable to French and British leaders.

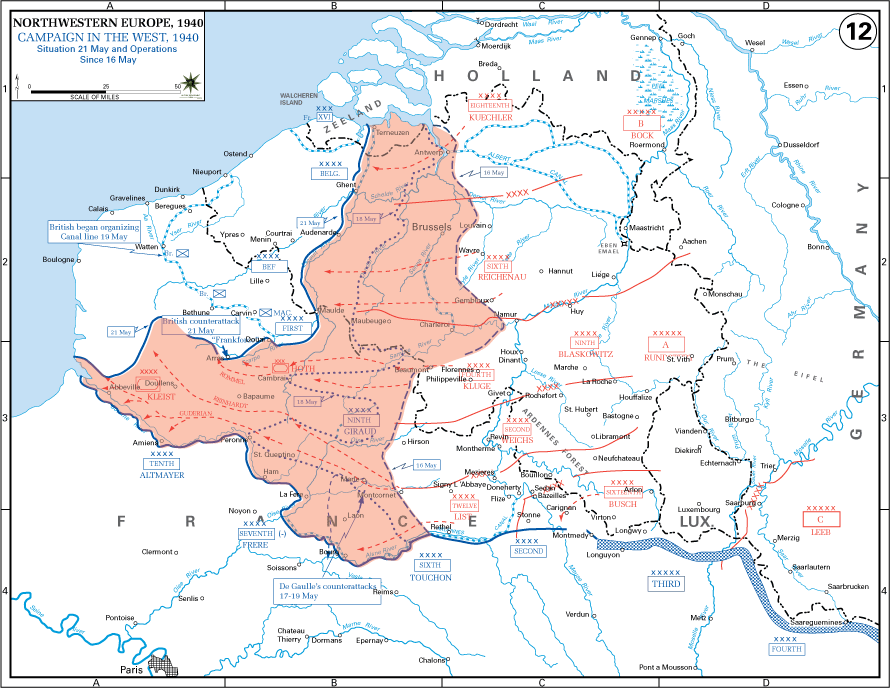
Situation on 21 May 1940

May wrote that when Hitler demanded a plan to invade France in September 1939, the German officer corps thought that it was foolhardy and discussed a coup d'état, only backing down when doubtful of the loyalty of the soldiers to them. With the deadline for the attack on France being postponed so often, OKH had time to revise Fall Gelb (Case Yellow) for an invasion over the Belgian Plain several times. In January 1940, Hitler came close to ordering the invasion but was prevented by bad weather. Until the Mechelen Incident in January forced a fundamental revision of Fall Gelb, the main effort (schwerpunkt) of the German army in Belgium would have been confronted by first-rate French and British forces, equipped with more and better tanks and with a great advantage in artillery. After the Mechelen Incident, OKH devised an alternative and hugely risky plan to make the invasion of Belgium a decoy, with the main effort switched to the Ardennes, to cross the Meuse and reach the Channel coast. May wrote that the alternative plan has been called the Manstein Plan but that Guderian, Manstein, Rundstedt, Halder and Hitler had been equally important in its creation.

War games held by Generalmajor (Major-General) Kurt von Tippelskirch, the chief of army intelligence and Oberst Ulrich Liss of Fremde Heere West (FHW, Foreign Armies West), tested the concept of an offensive through the Ardennes. Liss thought that swift reactions could not be expected from the "systematic French or the ponderous English" and used French and British methods, which made no provision for surprise and reacted slowly, when one was sprung. The results of the war games persuaded Halder that the Ardennes scheme could work, even though he and many other commanders still expected it to fail. May wrote that without the reassurance of intelligence analysis and the results of the war games, the possibility of Germany adopting the last version of Fall Gelb would have been remote. The French Dyle-Breda variant of the Allied deployment plan, was based on an accurate prediction of the German intentions, until the delays caused by the winter weather and shock of the Mechelen Incident led to the radical revision of Fall Gelb. The French sought to assure the British that they would act to prevent the Luftwaffe using bases in the Netherlands and the Meuse valley and to encourage the Belgian and Dutch governments. The politico-strategic aspects of the plan ossified French thinking and the Phoney War led to demands for Allied offensives in Scandinavia or the Balkans and the plan to start a war with the USSR. Changes to the Dyle-Breda variant might lead to forces being taken from the Western Front.

French and British intelligence sources were better than the German equivalents, which suffered from too many competing agencies but intelligence analysis was not as well integrated into Allied planning and decision-making. Information was delivered to operations officers but there was no mechanism like the German practice of allowing intelligence officers to comment on planning assumptions about opponents and allies. The insularity of the French and British intelligence agencies, meant that had they been asked if Germany would continue with a plan to attack across the Belgian plain after the Mechelen Incident, they would not have been able to point out how risky the Dyle-Breda variant was. May wrote that the wartime performance of the Allied intelligence services was abysmal. Daily and weekly evaluations had no analysis of fanciful predictions about German intentions and a May 1940 report from Switzerland, that the Germans would attack through the Ardennes, was marked as a German spoof. More items were obtained about invasions of Switzerland or the Balkans and German behaviour consistent with an Ardennes attack, such as the dumping of supplies and communications equipment on the Luxembourg border and the concentration of Luftwaffe air reconnaissance around Sedan and Charleville-Mézières was overlooked.

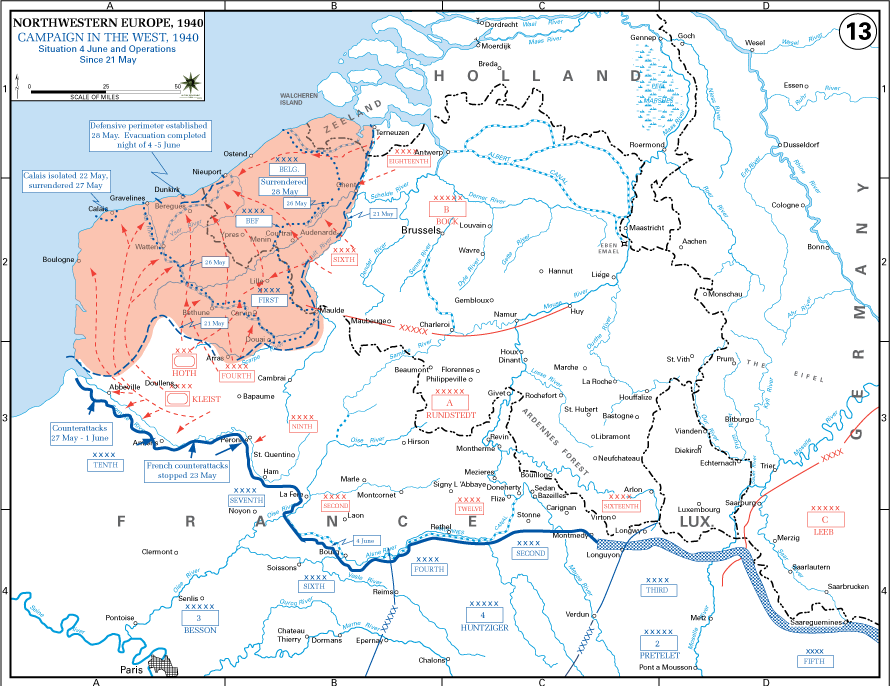
Situation on 4 June 1940

May wrote that French and British rulers were at fault for tolerating poor performance by the intelligence agencies and that the Germans could achieve surprise in May 1940, showed that even with Hitler, the process of executive judgement in Germany had worked better than in France and Britain. Allied politicians showed far less common sense in judging circumstances and deciding on policy but the Germans were no wiser. May referred to Marc Bloch in Strange Defeat (1940), that the German victory was a "triumph of intellect", which depended on Hitler's "methodical opportunism". Despite the mistakes of the Allies, May wrote that the Germans could not have succeeded but for outrageous good luck. German commanders wrote during the campaign and after, that often only a small difference had separated success from failure. Prioux thought that a counter-offensive could still have worked up to 19 May but by then, Belgian refugees were crowded on the roads needed for redeployment and the French transport units, that had performed well in the advance into Belgium, failed for lack of plans to move them back. Maurice Gamelin had said "It is all a question of hours." but the decision to sack Gamelin and appoint Weygand, caused a delay of two days.

=== Frieser (2005) ===
In 2005, German military historian Karl-Heinz Frieser wrote that the German general staff had tried to fight quick wars to avoid long two-front conflicts because of the vulnerable geographical position of the German state. The campaign of 1940 had not been planned as a blitzkrieg and study of the preparations for the campaign, especially of armaments show that the German commanders expected a long war similar to the First World War and was surprised by the success of the offensive. The war in the west occurred at a watershed in military history when military technology was favourable to the attack. The way that German armoured and air forces operated, led to a revival of the operational war of movement rather than position warfare, which made German command principles unexpectedly effective. By accident the German methods created a revolution in warfare, that France and its allies could not resist, still using the static thinking of the First World War. German officers were just as astonished but because of their training in mission tactics and operational thinking, could adapt much quicker.

Frieser argued that the unprecedented operational success of the Manstein Plan could only occur because the Allies fell into the trap, over and again, German success depended on forestalling Allied counter-moves, sometimes only by a few hours. Nazi and Allied propagandists later created a myth of an unstoppable German army, yet the Allies were superior in strength and in Case Red managed to adapt to German methods, although too late to avoid defeat. The German generals had been lukewarm about the Manstein Plan, Army Group A wanting to limit the speed of the attack to that of marching infantry. The breakthrough on the Meuse at Sedan created such an opportunity that the panzer divisions raced ahead of the infantry divisions. OKH and OKW occasionally lost control and in such unique circumstances, some German commanders ignored orders and regulations, claiming the discretion to follow mission tactics, the most notable being the unauthorised break-out from the Sedan bridgehead by Guderian. The events of 1940 had no relation to a blitzkrieg strategy ascribed to Hitler. Far from Hitler planning world domination by fighting a series of short wars, Hitler had not planned a war of any kind against the Allies.

Frieser argued that German rearmament was incomplete in 1939 and it had been France and Britain that had declared war on Germany; Hitler's gamble failed and left Germany with no way out, in a war against a more powerful coalition, with time on the Allies' side. Hitler chose flight forward and staked everything on a surprise attack, not supported by an officer corps mindful of the failure of the 1914 invasion. Allied generals did not anticipate the "daring leap" from the Meuse to the Channel and were as surprised as Hitler. Stopping the panzers short of Dunkirk was a mistake that forfeited the intended strategic success. The German campaign in the west was an "operational act of despair" to escape a dire strategic situation and blitzkrieg thinking occurred only after the Battle of France, it being the consequence, not the cause of victory. For the German army the triumph was hubristic, leading to exaggerated expectations about manoeuvre warfare and an assumption that victory over the USSR would be easy.

=== Tooze (2006) ===
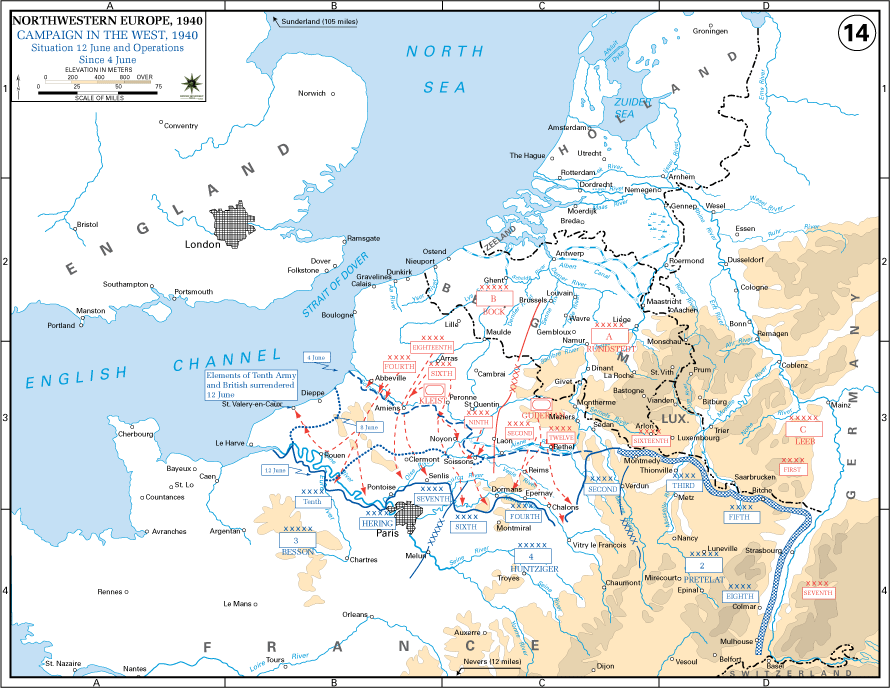
German advance to the Seine River, 4–12 June

In 2006, English historian Adam Tooze wrote that the German success could not be attributed to a great superiority in the machinery of industrial warfare. German rearmament showed no evidence of a strategic synthesis claimed by the supporters of the blitzkrieg thesis. There had been an acceleration in war spending after 1933 but no obvious strategy or realistic prediction of the war Germany would come to fight. The huge armaments plans of 1936 and 1938 were for a big partially mechanised army, a strategic air force and an ocean-going fleet. In early 1939, a balance of payments crisis led to chaos in the armaments programme; the beginning of the war led to armaments output increasing again but still with no sign of a blitzkrieg concept determining the programme. The same discrepancy between German military-industrial preparations and the campaign can be seen in the plans formed for the war in the west. There was no plan before September 1939 and the first version in October was a compromise that satisfied no-one but the capture the Channel coast to conduct an air war against Britain, was apparently the purpose determining armaments production from December 1939.

Tooze wrote that the plan failed to offer the possibility of a decisive victory in the west desired by Hitler but lasted until the Mechelen Incident of February 1940. The incident was the catalyst for an alternative plan for an encircling move through the Ardennes proposed by Manstein but it came too late to change the armaments programme. The swift victory in France was not the consequence of a thoughtful strategic synthesis but a lucky gamble, an improvisation to resolve the strategic problems that the generals and Hitler had failed to resolve by February 1940. The Allies and the Germans were equally reluctant to reveal the casual way that the Germans gained their biggest victory. The blitzkrieg myth suited the Allies, because it did not refer to their military incompetence; it was expedient to exaggerate the excellence of German equipment. The Germans avoided an analysis based on technical determinism, since this contradicted Nazi ideology and OKW attributed the victory to the "revolutionary dynamic of the Third Reich and its National Socialist leadership".

Tooze wrote that by contradicting the technology version of the blitzkrieg myth, recent writing had tended to vindicate the regime view, that success was due to the Manstein Plan and the fighting power of German troops. Tooze wrote that although there had been no strategic synthesis, the human element could be overstated. The success of the German offensive was dependent on the mobilisation of the German economy in 1939 and the geography of western Europe. The number of German tanks in May 1940 showed that output of armoured vehicles had not been the priority of the German armaments effort since 1933 but without the tank production drive of autumn 1939, the position would have been far worse. After the invasion of Poland there were only 2,701 serviceable vehicles, most being Panzer I and Panzer II, only the 541 Panzer III and IV tanks being suitable for a western campaign. Had these tanks been used according to the October 1939 plan, the Germans would have been lucky to achieve a draw. By 10 May 1940, the Germans had 1,456 tanks, 785 Panzer III, 290 Panzer IV and 381 Panzer 35(t) and Panzer 38(t) tanks. None of the German panzers were a match for the best French tanks and no anti-tank gun was effective against the Char B but German tanks had good fighting compartments and excellent wireless equipment, making the tanks that the Germans did have an effective armoured force.

Tooze wrote that the Manstein Plan contained no new and revolutionary theory of armoured warfare and was not based on faith in the superiority of German soldiers but the Napoleonic formula of achieving superiority at one point, known in German terms as Schwerpunktbildung; the plan combined materialism and military art. With 135 German divisions facing 151 Allied divisions, concentration and surprise which were the principles of operational doctrine, were indispensable and the German success in achieving these explains the victory, not better equipment or morale. The Germans committed 29 divisions to the diversion in Belgium and the Netherlands which were countered by 57 Allied divisions, including the best French and British formations. Along the Rhine valley, the Germans had 19 mediocre divisions and the French garrisoned the Maginot Line with 36 divisions, odds of about 2:1 against the Germans. The Germans were able to mass 45 elite divisions in the Ardennes against 18 second-rate Belgian and French divisions, a ratio of 3:1 in favour of the Germans, multiplied in effect by deception and speed of manoeuvre. No panzer division was held in reserve and had the attempt failed there would have been no armoured units to oppose an Allied counter-offensive. Daily losses were high but the short campaign meant that the total number of casualties was low.

By keeping much of their air forces in reserve, the Allies conceded air superiority to the Luftwaffe but operations on 10 May cost 347 aircraft and by the end of the month the Luftwaffe had lost 30 percent of its aircraft, with another 13 percent badly damaged. Intensive and costly air operations were made in support of Panzer Group Kleist, which had 1,222 tanks, 545 half-tracks and 39,373 lorries and cars, enough to cover 960 miles (1,540 km) of road. On the approach to the Meuse crossings, the panzer group moved in four 250 miles (400 km)-long columns over only four roads and had to reach the crossings by the evening of 13 May or the Allies might have time to react. Huge risks were taken to get the columns forward, including running petrol lorries in the armoured columns to refuel vehicles at every stop. Had Allied bombers been able to pierce the fighter screen, the German advance could have been turned into a disaster. To keep going for three days and nights, drivers were given Pervitin stimulants. Tooze wrote that these expedients were limited to about 12 divisions and that the rest of the German army invaded France on foot, supplied by horse and cart from railheads as in 1914. The Channel coast provided a natural obstacle about 150 mi (240 km) away, a distance over which motorised supply could function efficiently over the dense French road network, commandeering supplies from French farms as they went.

Tooze wrote that the German victories of 1940 appeared to be of less significance than the changes they caused in the US, where hostility to German ambitions had been manifest since 1938. On 16 May, the day after the German breakthrough on the Meuse, Roosevelt laid before Congress a plan to create the greatest military-industrial complex in history, capable of building 50,000 aircraft a year. Congress passed the Two-Ocean Navy Act and in September the US, for the first time, began conscription in peacetime to raise an army of 1.4 million men. By 1941, the US was producing a similar quantity of armaments to Britain or Germany and financing the first permanent increase in civilian consumption since the 1920s. The British post-Dunkirk strategy was a gamble on access to the resources of the US and the empire and that the US would supply weapons and materials even when British had exhausted their ability to pay. Unless Britain was defeated, Germany was confronted by a fundamental strategic problem, that the US had the means to use its industrial power against the Third Reich.

=== Doughty (2014) ===
France under German occupation: (Southern zone from November 1942 in Fall Anton). Yellow zone under Italian administration

Robert A. Doughty, a history department chair at West Point, has explored numerous facets of 20th century French military history. He wrote that the German offensive was complicated and at times chaotic, rather than a simple armoured rush through the Ardennes and across France. French strategy had left the Allies vulnerable to a breakthrough along the Ardennes and the army failed adequately to react to the breakthrough and the massing of tanks; tactically the German tanks and infantry had defeated French defences that were rarely formidable. French military intelligence also failed to identify the main German attack and even on the morning of 13 May, thought that the Schwerpunkt (main effort) was in central Belgium. The French had made the grave error of concentrating on evidence that supported their assumptions rather than assess German capacity and give credence to reports that the Germans were not conforming to French expectations. The French had based their strategy on a theory of methodical battle and firepower against a German theory of manoeuvre, surprise and speed. French centralised authority was not suited to the practice of hasty counter-attacks or bold manoeuvres, sometimes appearing to move in "slow motion".

Doughty wrote that methodical battle might have succeeded against a similar opponent but was inadequate against the fast and aggressive Germans, who seized the initiative and were strategically, operationally and tactically superior at the decisive point, defeating the French who were unable to react quickly enough as deep German advances disorganised French counter-moves. Experience in Poland was used to improve the German army and make officers and units more flexible and a willingness to be pragmatic allowed reforms to be made which, while incomplete, showed their value in France. The French had been overconfident and after the fall of Poland had speeded the assembly of large armoured units but failed to re-think the theory that guided their use. After the defences at Sedan had been criticised, Huntziger had written, "I believe that no urgent measures are necessary to reinforce the Sedan sector."; the Second Army had made no effort to improve them.

In the German tradition of delegation, sometimes known as Auftagstaktik (mission command), leaders were trained to take the initiative, within the commander's intent, to accomplish the mission. The German system worked better than the French emphasis on obedience, following doctrine and eschewing novelty. Auftragstaktik was not a panacea as the argument between Kleist and Guderian demonstrated but Guderian's refusals orders would have been intolerable to a French officer. On 14 May, Lieutenant-General Jean-Marie-Léon Etcheberrigaray refused to order the 53rd Division to counter-attack, due to a lack of time; Major-General Georges-Louis-Marie Brocard commander of the 3e Division Cuirassée (3e DCr), could not attack for lack of supplies and was sacked for the failure to supply and move the division. Command from the front was possible for German commanders, because their chiefs of staff were accustomed to wield executive authority, managing the flow of units and supplies, tasks which in the French army were reserved for the commanding officer. Guderian had been free to move around during the fighting at Sedan, while Grandsard and Huntziger remained at their headquarters, unable to hurry on units and overrule hesitant commanders.

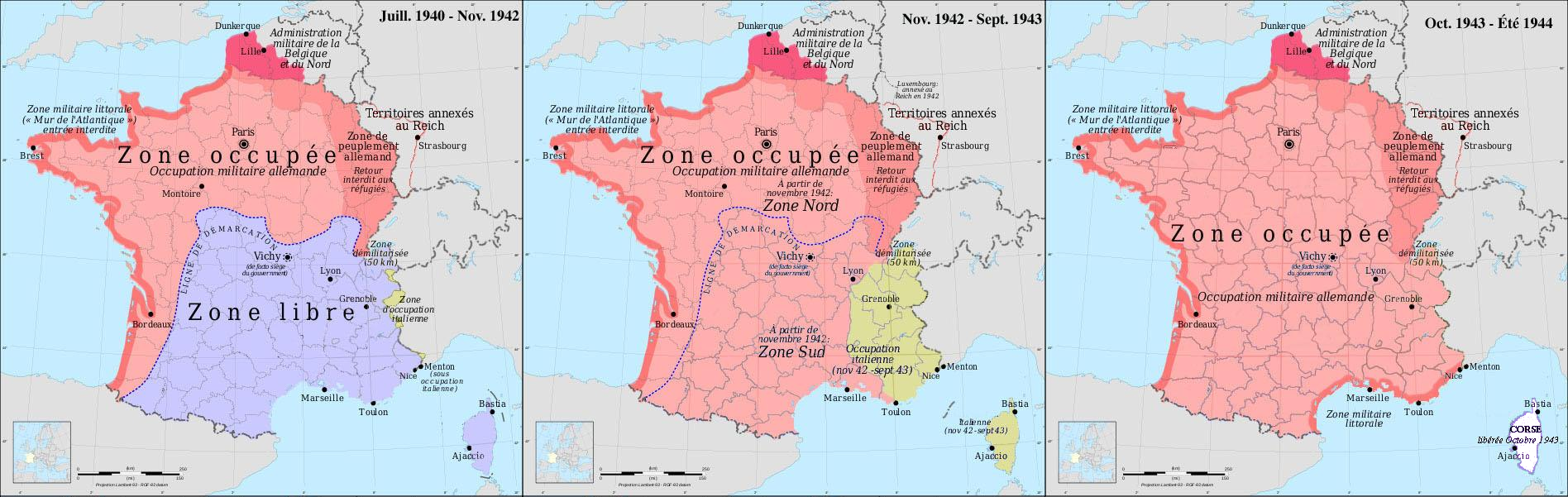
Stages of the German occupation of France, 1940–1943.

Doughty noted that the 55th, 53rd and 71st Infantry divisions had collapsed at Sedan under little pressure from the Germans but that this was not a matter of French decadence but of soldiers being individuals within a group, which fights according to doctrine and strategy in the spirit by which they are led. The French divisions suffered from poor organisation, doctrine, training, leadership and a lack of confidence in their weapons, which would have caused any unit to fail. From Luxembourg to Dunkirk, the XIX Panzer Corps had 3,845 (7.0 percent) casualties, 640 (1.2 percent) killed and 3,205 men wounded (5.8 percent) of about 55,000 men. Of 1,500 officers, 53 (3.5 percent) were killed and 241 (16.1 percent) were wounded. The French Second Army had 12 percent casualties, from 3–4 percent killed and from 8–9 percent wounded. The German force had a far greater number of officer casualties and were able to keep fighting, because other officers could take over. The contrasting methods of command flowed from the rival armies' theories of war, the French system being a management of men and equipment model and the German system relying on rapid decision and personal influence at the decisive point in a mobile battle. By 16 May, the French army had been brought to the brink of collapse.

== See also ==
- Historiography of World War II
- Historiography of Vichy France

== Bibliography ==
Books

- Alexander, M. S. (2001). "The French View". In Bond, B.; Taylor, M. D. (eds.). The Battle of France and Flanders: Sixty Years On. Barnsley: Pen & Sword. ISBN 978-0-85052-811-4.
- Bloch, Marc (1968) [1946]. Strange Defeat: A Statement of Evidence Written in 1940 [L'etrange defaite te moignage ecrit en 1940] (English trans. ed.). New York: Norton. ISBN 978-0-393-31911-8.
- Hoffman, S. (1997). "The Trauma of 1940: A Disaster and its Traces". In Blatt, Joel (ed.). The French Defeat of 1940: Reassessments. Providence, RI: Berghahn. pp. 354–70. ISBN 978-1-57181-109-7.
- Doughty, R. A. (2014) [1990]. The Breaking Point: Sedan and the Fall of France, 1940. Stackpole Military History (Stackpole, Mechanicsburg, PA ed.). Hamden, CN: Archon Books. ISBN 978-0-8117-1459-4.
- Frieser, K-H. (2005). The Blitzkrieg Legend (English trans. ed.). Annapolis, MD: Naval Institute Press. ISBN 978-1-59114-294-2.
- Fuller, J. F. C. (1956). A Military History of the Western World: From the American Civil War to the End of World War II. Vol. III. New York: Da Capo Press. ISBN 978-0-306-80306-2.
- Jackson, Peter (1 November 2004). "Returning to the fall of France: Recent work on the causes and consequences of the 'strange defeat' of 1940". Modern & Contemporary France. 12 (4). Taylor & Francis: 513–536. doi:10.1080/0963948042000284768. ISSN 0963-9489. OCLC 4558271900. S2CID 143996483.
- May, Ernest R. (2000). Strange Victory: Hitler's Conquest of France. London: I.B.Tauris. ISBN 978-1-85043-329-3.
- Melvin, Mungo (2001). "The German View". In Bond, B.; Taylor, M. D. (eds.). The Battle of France and Flanders: Sixty Years On. Barnsley: Pen & Sword. ISBN 978-0-85052-811-4.
- Tooze, Adam (2006). The Wages of Destruction: The Making and Breaking of the Nazi Economy. London: Allen Lane. ISBN 978-0-7139-9566-4.
- Vaïsse, Maurice, ed. (2000). Mai-juin 1940: défaite française, victoire allemande, sous l'oeil des historiens étrangers [French defeat, German victory, through the eyes of foreign historians]. Paris: Autrement. ISBN 978-2-86260-991-1. OCLC 1123796913.

Journals

- Alexander, Martin S. (1990). "The fall of France, 1940". Journal of Strategic Studies. 13 (1): 10–44. doi:10.1080/01402399008437399.
- Cairns, J. (1959). "Along the Road Back to France 1940". American Historical Review. 64 (3). no. 3: 583–603. doi:10.2307/1905180. ISSN 0002-8762. JSTOR 1905180.
- Cairns, John C. (1974). "Some Recent Historians and the 'Strange Defeat' of 1940". The Journal of Modern History. 46 (1). University of Chicago Press Journals: 60–85. doi:10.1086/241165. ISSN 0022-2801. JSTOR 1875957. OCLC 5545740268. S2CID 144819943.
- Fink, Carole (1996). "Marc Bloch and the drôle de guerre: Prelude to the 'Strange Defeat'". Historical Reflections / Réflexions Historiques. 22 (1): 33–46. JSTOR 41299049.
