= Paul Guiraud =

French historian

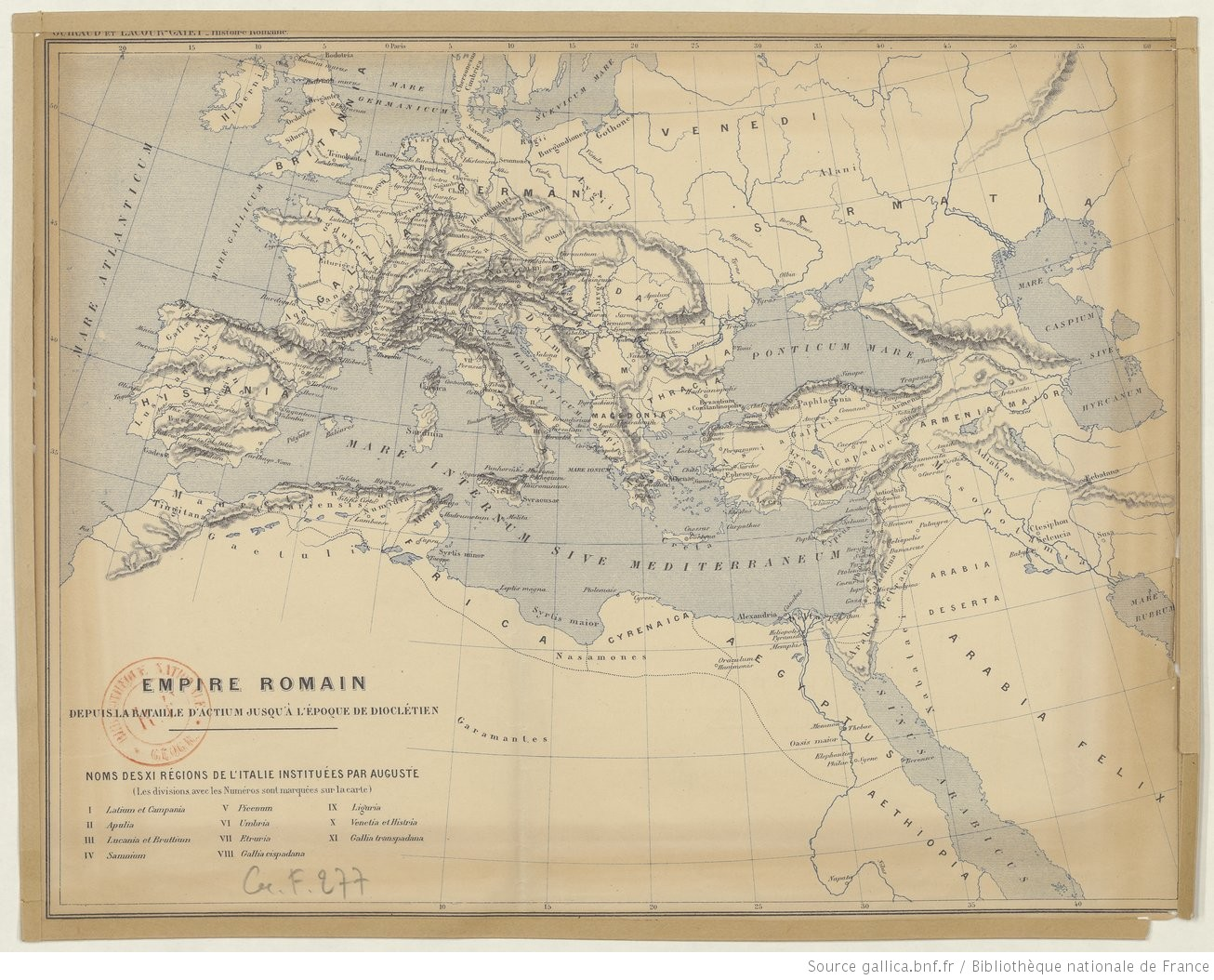
Roman Empire from the Battle of Actium to the era of Diocletian by Paul Guiraud and Georges Lacour-Gayet, published by Erhard, Paris

Paul Guiraud (15 January 1850 – 25 February 1907) was a French historian born in Cenne-Monestiés, a commune located in the department of Aude. He was the brother of historian Jean Guiraud.

Paul Guiraud was a professor of Greek history to the faculties at Douai and Toulouse, and later a lecturer at the École Normale Supérieure. In 1906 he was elected a member of the Académie des Sciences Morales et Politiques.

== Biography ==
A graduate of the École normale supérieure (Paris), he obtained his agrégation in history in 1874 and began his teaching career in Saint-Étienne in 1874, then taught successively at high schools in Angoulême in 1875 and Carcassonne in 1878.

On June 30, 1879, he defended his two doctoral theses in literature at the Faculty of Paris. The first, in French, dealt with the dispute between Julius Caesar and the Roman Senate. The second, in Ptolemaic dynasty, focuses on the alliance between the Ptolemies and the Romans. From 1888 to 1898, he participated in dozens of thesis defenses as a member of the jury.

In 1879, having obtained a doctorate in literature, he was appointed lecturer in history at the Faculty of Douai and, a year later, lecturer in ancient history at the Faculty of Arts in Toulouse. In 1886, he took over the chair of his mentor, Numa Denis Fustel de Coulanges, at the École Normale, publishing a biography of him in 1896. Two years later, he became a lecturer at the Sorbonne. In 1895, he became an assistant professor there, and in 1904, he was appointed professor of Greek history at the university. He was elected a member of the Académie des Sciences Morales et Politiques in 1906.

During his career, Paul Guiraud contributed to the Revue critique, the Revue historique, La Grande Encyclopédie, the Dictionnaire des antiquités, the Atlas historique, and the Revue des cours et conférences.

Paul Guiraud is the brother of historian Jean Guiraud.

== Written works ==
Among his better written efforts were an 1896 biography of his former teacher, Fustel de Coulanges (1830–1889), and a work titled "Vie privée et la vie publique des Grecs" (Private and public life in ancient Greece). Other written works by Guiraud include:

- Le Différend entre César et le Sénat (59-49 av. J.-C.) (Differences between Caesar and the Senate (59-49 BC), (1878).
- Les Assemblées provinciales dans l'Empire romain (The provincial assemblies in the Roman Empire), (1887).
- La Propriété foncière en Grèce jusqu'à la conquête romaine (Greek regions prior to the Roman Conquest), (1893).
- La Main-d'œuvre industrielle dans l'ancienne Grèce (Industrial labor in Ancient Greece), (1900).
- Études économiques sur l'antiquité (Economic studies on antiquity), (1905).

== Bibliography ==
- This article is based on a translation of an equivalent article at the French Wikipedia.
