= Roger Lambelin =

French journalist, writer and soldier

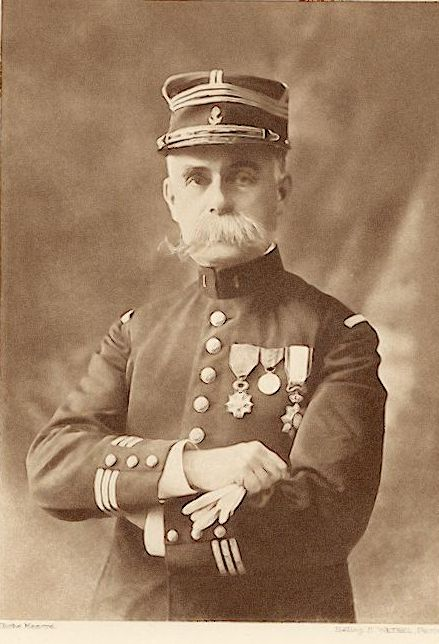
- Roger Lambelin in captain's uniform
- Died: 1929; 7e arrondissement de Paris
- Occupations: Journalist, Politician, Military Officer

Roger Lambelin was a French royalist journalist, essayist, and political activist.

As a young military officer cadet he helped found the Jeunesse Royaliste (Young Royalists) in 1888 which became a forerunner of Action Francaise. He was then an army officer in French Indochina in Tonkin and was decommissioned in 1888. He later fought in the First World War.

He led the political office of the Duke of Orleans and was a member of the Municipal Council of Paris representing Les Invalides district from . He founded the Revue Samedi and until his death in 1929 was the editor of the Revue des questions historiques.
