= Ernest Denis =

French historian

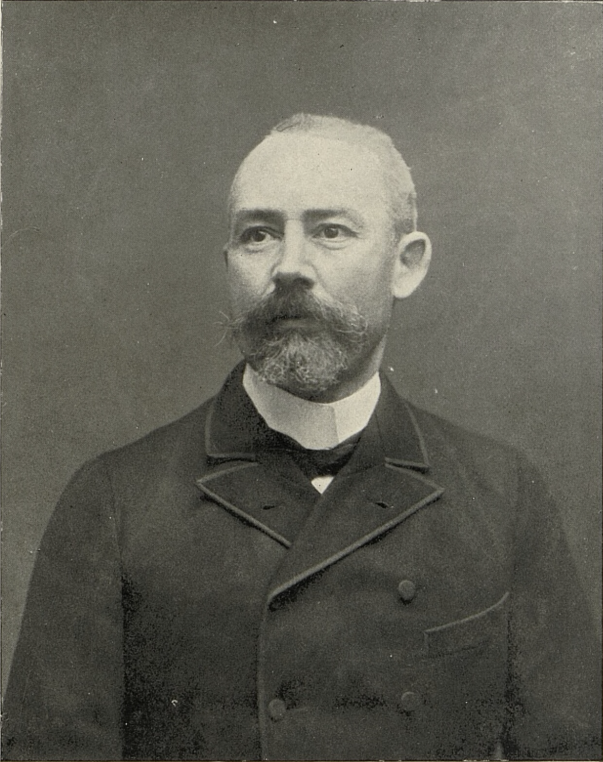
- Born: 3 January 1849
- Died: 4 January 1921 (aged 72)
- Occupation: Historian
- Known for: Specialist of Germany and Bohemia, role in the establishment of the Czechoslovak state

Ernest Denis (3 January 1849 – 4 January 1921) was a French historian.

== Biography ==
Denis became known as a specialist in Germany and Bohemia, and played a major role in the establishment of the Czechoslovak state in 1918. Along with Louis Léger, he is considered to be one of the most highly regarded 20th-century historians of the Slav world in France.

In 1916, Tomáš Garrique Masaryk and Edvard Beneš founded the Comité national tchèque in Paris, and almost at the same time Louis Eisenmann, Louis Léger, and Ernest Denis founded the Comité national d'études, which also advocated for the independence of a Czech state. In 1918, the French government created Czechoslovak legions. On 28 October 1918, the Republic of Czechoslovakia was proclaimed in Prague.

Upon the death of Denis, the Czechoslovak state bought his house in Paris in order to create an institute for Slavic studies.
