= Louis Eisenmann =

French historian

Louis Eisenmann (31 July 1869 – 14 May 1937) was a French historian and professor of Slavic studies.

Born in Haguenau into a Jewish family, Eisenmann held a chair at the University of Dijon from 1905. In 1922 he moved to the Sorbonne in Paris, where he held a professorship and was secretary of the Institute for Slavic Sciences and editor of the Revue historique. He was also director of the Ernest Denis Institute in Prague and campaigned for the exchange of lecturers and students between Germany and France.

Above all, Eisenmann wrote about the problems of the Austro-Hungarian monarchy and advocated for the rights of its national minorities. In 1916, Tomáš Garrigue Masaryk and Edvard Beneš founded the Comité national tchèque in Paris, and almost at the same time Eisenmann, Louis Léger, and Ernest Denis founded the Comité national d'études, which also advocated for the independence of a Czech state. Early in 1918, the French government created a Czechoslovak Legion, which represented a significant auxiliary force at a decisive phase of the war after Russia had made peace. On 28 October 1918, the Republic of Czechoslovakia was proclaimed in Prague.

Eisenmann’s correspondence with Gottfried Salomon is kept in the International Institute of Social History.

He died in Paris in 1937, aged 67, still in office as a professor at Paris and as Director of the Ernest Denis Institute in Prague.

== Major publications ==
- Chapters on Austria-Hungary in Ernest Lavisse, Alfred Rambaud l'Histoire générale du IVe siecle a nos jours (1893)
- Le compromis austro-hongrois de 1867 (Paris, 1904)
- Le régime des cultes en Autriche et en Hongrie (1905)
- Dijon, centre de communications (1908)
- ”Austria-Hungary”, chapter 7 of The Cambridge Modern History Vol. XII, The Latest Age (1910)
- Recueil d'études en hommages
- La Tchécoslovaquie (1921)
- La Hongrie contemporaine (1921)
- Les problèmes de l'Europe centrale (Conférences organisées par la sociétée des anciens élèves et élèves de l'école, Alcan, 1923)
- Un grand européen: Edouard Benès (1934)
- Histoire de Russie, with P. Milioukov and C. Seignobos, (3 volumes, 1932-1933);
- L'évolution intérieure de l'Allemagne (1935)
