= Historiography of World War II =

Area of study on 1939–1945 conflict

The historiography of World War II is the study of how historians portray the causes, conduct, and outcomes of World War II.

There are different perspectives on the causes of the war; the three most prominent are the Orthodox from the 1950s, Revisionist from the 1970s, and Post-Revisionism which offers the most contemporary perspective. The orthodox perspective arose during the aftermath of the war. The main historian noted for this perspective is Hugh Trevor-Roper. Orthodox historians argue that Hitler was a master planner who intentionally started World War II due to his strong beliefs on fascism, expansionism, and the supremacy of the German state. Revisionist historians argue that it was an ordinary war by world standards and that Hitler was an opportunist of the sort who commonly appears in world history; he merely took advantage of the opportunities given to him. This viewpoint became popular in the 1970s, especially in the revisionism of A. J. P. Taylor. Orthodox historians argue that, throughout the course of the war, the Axis powers were an evil consuming the world with their powerful message and malignant ideology, while the Allied powers were trying to protect democracy and freedom. Post-revisionist historians of the causes, such as Alan Bullock, argue that the cause of the war was a matter of both the evil and the banal. Essentially Hitler was a strategist with clear aims and objectives, that would not have been achievable without taking advantage of the opportunities given to him. Each perspective of World War II offers a different analysis and provides different perspectives on the blame, conduct and causes of the war.

On the result of the war, historians in countries occupied by the Nazis developed strikingly similar interpretations celebrating a victory against great odds, with national liberation based on national unity. That unity is repeatedly described as the greatest source of future strength. Historians in common glorified the resistance movement (somewhat to the neglect of the invaders who actually overthrew the Nazis). There is great stress on heroes — including celebrities such as Charles de Gaulle, Winston Churchill and Josip Broz Tito — but also countless brave partisans and members of the resistance. Women rarely played a role in the celebrity or the histories, although since the 1990s, social historians have been piecing together the role of women on the home fronts. In recent years much scholarly attention has focused on how popular memories were constructed through selection, and how commemorations are held.

== Causes and motives ==
=== Self esteem and glory ===
R.J. Bosworth argues the major powers have experienced intellectual conflict in interpreting their wartime stories. Some have ignored the central issues. Germany and, to a much lesser extent, Japan have experienced a collective self-analysis. But these two, as well as Great Britain, France, Russia, and Italy, have largely ignored many roles and have looked instead for glory even when it was lacking. In a lot of cases the countries deny any involvement in war crimes or objectionable historical occurrences.

=== Blame ===
Blame as the driving force during World War II, is a widely known orthodox perspective. Especially directly after World War II, Nazi Germany was held to blame for starting the war. Orthodox historians cited several reasons for this. Germany was the one who initially invaded Poland against the recommendation of the allies, and also attacked the Soviet Union. Also, the system of alliances between the Axis powers was one that was only meant for war. The Tripartite Pact stated that if any country declared war on one of the Axis countries, the other two would also declare war on those countries. Another reason, historians saw, is that the policies of Hitler were overly aggressive; not only did Hitler preach war with France and the Soviet Union, but he followed a careful plan of expansion. The events that took place before the war such as the Remilitarization of the Rhineland, Anschluss, and the German involvement during the Spanish Civil War, showed that Hitler was anticipating the possibility of war and preparing for one.

=== Taylor The Origins of the Second World War (1961) ===
In 1961, English historian A. J. P. Taylor published his most controversial book, The Origins of the Second World War, which earned him a reputation as a revisionist—that is, a historian who sharply changes which party was "guilty." The book had a quick, profound impact, upsetting many readers. Taylor argued against the standard thesis that the outbreak of the Second World War – by which Taylor specifically meant the war that broke out in September 1939 – was the result of an intentional plan on the part of guilty Adolf Hitler. He began his book with the statement that too many people have accepted uncritically what he called the "Nuremberg Thesis", that the Second World War was the result of criminal conspiracy by a small gang comprising Hitler and his associates. He regarded the "Nuremberg Thesis" as too convenient for too many people and claimed that it shielded the blame for the war from the leaders of other states, let the German people avoid any responsibility for the war and created a situation where West Germany was a respectable Cold War ally against the Soviets.

Taylor's thesis was that Hitler was not the demoniacal figure of popular imagination but in foreign affairs a normal German leader. Citing Fritz Fischer, he argued that the foreign policy of Nazi Germany was the same as those of the Weimar Republic and the German Empire. Moreover, in a partial break with his view of German history advocated in The Course of German History, he argued that Hitler was not just a normal German leader but also a normal Western leader. As a normal Western leader, Hitler was no better or worse than Stresemann, Chamberlain or Daladier. His argument was that Hitler wished to make Germany the strongest power in Europe but he did not want or plan war. The outbreak of war in 1939 was an unfortunate accident caused by mistakes on everyone's part.

Notably, Taylor portrayed Hitler as a grasping opportunist with no beliefs other than the pursuit of power and anti-Semitism. He argued that Hitler did not possess any sort of programme and his foreign policy was one of drift and seizing chances as they offered themselves. He did not even consider Hitler's anti-Semitism unique: he argued that millions of Germans were just as ferociously anti-Semitic as Hitler and there was no reason to single out Hitler for sharing the beliefs of millions of others.

Taylor argued that the basic problem with an interwar Europe was a flawed Treaty of Versailles that was sufficiently onerous to ensure that the overwhelming majority of Germans would always hate it, but insufficiently onerous in that it failed to destroy Germany's potential to be a Great Power once more. In this way, Taylor argued that the Versailles Treaty was destabilising, for sooner or later the innate power of Germany that the Allies had declined to destroy in 1918–1919 would inevitably reassert itself against the Versailles Treaty and the international system established by Versailles that the Germans regarded as unjust and thus had no interest in preserving. Though Taylor argued that the Second World War was not inevitable and that the Versailles Treaty was nowhere near as harsh as contemporaries like John Maynard Keynes believed, what he regarded as a flawed peace settlement made the war more likely than not.

== By geography ==
Europe at the height of German control (in blue) in 1942

The Nazis perfected the art of stealing, draining the local economies to the maximum or beyond, so that overall production fell. In all occupied countries resistance movements sprang up. The Germans tried to infiltrate and suppress them, but after the war they emerged as political actors. The local Communists were especially active in promoting resistance movements, as was the British Special Operations Executive (SOE).

=== Canada ===
Canada incorporated professional historians to Canadian Military Headquarters in the United Kingdom during the war and paid much attention to the chronicling of the conflict in the words of the official historians of the Army Historical Section and through art and trained painters. The official history of the Canadian Army was undertaken after the war, with an interim draft published in 1948 and three volumes in the 1950s. This was in comparison to the First World War's official history, only one volume of which was completed by 1939 and the full text only released after a change in authors some 40 years after the fact. Official histories of the RCAF and RCN in the Second World War were also a long time coming, and the book Arms, Men and Government by Charles Stacey (one of the main contributors to the Army history) was published in the 1980s as an "official" history of the war policies of the Canadian government. The performance of Canadian forces in some battles has remained controversial, such as Hong Kong and Dieppe, and a variety of books have been written on them from various points of view. Serious historians, mainly scholars, emerged in the years after the Second World War, foremost Terry Copp (a scholar) and Denis Whitaker (a former soldier).

=== Eastern Front ===
It is commonly said that history is written by the victors, but the opposite occurred in the chronicling of the Eastern Front, particularly in the West. Soviet secrecy and unwillingness to acknowledge events that might discredit the regime led to them revealing little information, always heavily edited, leaving western historians mostly to rely on German sources. While valuable sources, they tended to be self-serving; German generals, in particular, tried to distance themselves and the Heer from the Nazi Party, while at the same time blaming them for their defeat (individuals supporting these arguments are commonly called part of the 'Hitler Lost Us The War' group). While this self-serving approach was noticed at the time, it was still generally accepted as the closest version of the truth. The result was a commonly held picture of the Heer being the superior army, ground down by the vast numbers of the 'Bolshevik horde' and betrayed by the stupidity of Hitler. Not only did this ignore Hitler's talent as a military leader, an erratic talent that was sometimes brilliantly incisive and sometimes grossly in error, it also severely undervalued the remarkable transformation of the Soviet armed forces, especially the Red Army, from the timid, conservative force of 1941 to an effective war-winning organisation.

After the fall of the Berlin Wall, Western historians were suddenly exposed to the vast number of Soviet records of the time. This has led to an explosion of the works on the subject, notably by David Glantz, Earl Ziemke and Richard Overy. These historians revealed the brutality of Stalin's regime, the recovery of the USSR and the Red Army in 1942 and the courage and abilities of the average Soviet soldier, relying on Soviet archival material to do so. Phillips Payson O'Brien argues that it is a fallacy that the war was won on the Eastern Front. He argues instead that it was won by the air-sea battle, which immobilized the German and Japanese forces. They lost mobility, were unable to move munitions from the factory to the battlefield and ran out of fuel for their aircraft and ships. They became highly vulnerable and were helpless.

Especially here the provided data gets interpreted differently. When it comes to casualties, there are massive differences, which are often influenced by the political or societical structure of a country. This cannot be really proven though, because the provided data from that time is already manipulated and may not be true or fabricated.

Europe at War 1939–1945: No Simple Victory (2006) by Welsh historian Norman Davies sought to correct common misconceptions about the war, such as that contrary to popular belief in the West, the dominant part of the conflict took place in Eastern Europe between the two totalitarian systems of the century, communism and Nazism; that Stalin's USSR was as bad as Hitler's Germany. The subtitle No Simple Victory does therefore not just refer to the losses and suffering the Allies had to endure to defeat the Axis but also the difficult moral choice the Western democracies had to make when allying themselves with one criminal regime in order to defeat another.

=== France ===
==== Battle of France, 1940 ====
The German victory over French and British forces in the Battle of France (10 May – 22 June 1940) was significant, generating a large popular and scholarly literature.

Observers in 1940 found the events unexpected and earth-shaking. Historian Martin Alexander notes that Belgium and the Netherlands fell to the German army in a matter of days and the British were soon driven back to their home islands:

But it was France's downfall that stunned the watching world. The shock was all the greater because the trauma was not limited to a catastrophic and deeply embarrassing defeat of her military forces - it also involved the unleashing of a conservative political revolution that, on 10 July 1940, interred the Third Republic and replaced it with the authoritarian, collaborationist Etat Français of Vichy. All this was so deeply disorienting because France had been regarded as a great power....The collapse of France, however, was a different case (a 'strange defeat' as it was dubbed in the haunting phrase of the Sorbonne's great medieval historian and Resistance martyr, Marc Bloch).

One of the most influential books on the war was written in summer 1940 by French historian Marc Bloch: L'Étrange Défaite ("Strange Defeat"). He raised most of the issues historians have debated since. He blamed France's leadership:

What drove our armies to disaster was the cumulative effect of a great number of different mistakes. One glaring characteristic is, however, common to all of them. Our leaders...were incapable of thinking in terms of a new war.

Guilt was widespread. Carole Fink argues that Bloch:

blamed the ruling class, the military and the politicians, the press and the teachers, for a flawed national policy and a weak defense against the Nazi menace, for betraying the real France and abandoning its children. Germany had won because its leaders had better understood the methods and psychology of modern combat.

==== Resistance ====
The heroism of the French Resistance has always been a favoured topic in France and Britain, with new books in English appearing regularly.

==== Vichy France ====
After 1945 the French ignored or downplayed the role of Marshal Petain's puppet government in Vichy France. Since the late 20th century it has become a major research topic.

==== Collaboration ====
Collaboration with the Germans was long denied by the French, but since the late 20th century has generated a large literature.

==== Civilian conditions ====
The roles of civilians, forced labourers and POWs has a large literature.

There are numerous studies of women.

==== Alsace-Lorraine ====
Germany integrated Alsace-Lorraine into its German Empire in 1871, France recovered it in 1918, it was again in occupation 1940–45. There was widespread material damage. The first wave of destruction in 1940 was inflicted by German forces, the second was caused by Allied bombers in 1944, and the final wave surrounded bitter fighting between German occupiers and American liberators in 1944–1945.

=== Denmark ===
Beginning with the German occupation of Denmark in 1940 and lasting until 1943, the Danish government had a "Policy of Cooperation" (da) with Nazi Germany. This meant the Danish government tried to do a balancing act of officially cooperating with the Nazis, while at the same time also working against them and aiding the Danish resistance. Due to this cooperation, Adolf Hitler labelled Denmark as the "model protectorate". When the Policy of Cooperation collapsed in 1943, the resistance helped about 7,000 Jews (and about 500 non-Jewish spouses of Jews) escape across Øresund to neutral Sweden. This operation is known as the rescue of the Danish Jews, and was a great source of frustration for the Nazis.

Denmark has a large popular literature on the war years, which has helped shape national identity and politics. Scholars have also been active but have much less influence on this topic. After the liberation two conflicting narratives emerged. A consensus narrative told how Danes were united in resistance. However, there was also a revisionist interpretation which paid attention to the resistance of most Danes, but presented Danish establishment as a collaborating enemy of Danish values. The revisionist version from the 1960s was successfully adopted by the political Left for two specific goals: to blemish the establishment now allied with the "imperialist" United States, and to argue against Danish membership in the European Community. From the 1980s, the Right started to use revisionism to attack asylum legislation. Finally around 2003, Liberal Prime Minister Anders Fogh Rasmussen started using it as his basic narrative of the war years (partly to legitimize his government's decision to join the war against Iraq in 2003). The occupation has thus played a central role in Danish political culture since 1945, although the role of professional scholars has been marginal.

=== Netherlands ===
Dutch historiography of World War II focused on the government in exile, German repression, Dutch resistance, the Hunger Winter of 1944-45 and, above all, the Holocaust. The economy was largely neglected; it was robust in 1940-41 then deteriorated rapidly as exploitation produced low productivity, impoverishment and hunger.

=== Norway ===
The memory of the war seared Norwegians and shaped national policies. Economic issues remain an important topic.

=== Poland ===
On August 1, 1944, the clandestine Polish Home Army, owing allegiance to the exiled government in London, initiated an uprising in Warsaw against the occupying Germans. There is a large literature in several languages. The Warsaw Rising Museum (WRM), opened in Warsaw in 2004 to commemorate it.

Polish Jews made up about half of Holocaust victims. There is a large literature on the Holocaust in Poland and its memory and memorials, and also the Jewish uprising in the Warsaw ghetto in 1943.

=== Soviet Union ===
Popular behaviour has been explored in Byelorussia under the Germans, using oral history, letters of complaint, memoirs, and reports made by the Soviet secret police and by the Communist Party.

== By theme ==
=== Common themes: heroic liberation from Nazis ===
Almost all national narratives of the Second World War—ranging from historiography in liberal democracies to that of Communist dictatorship—fit the same European pattern. The French-German historian Etienne François has identified the common themes, as paraphrased by Johan Östling:

Fundamental to them all...was the victory over Nazi Germany. In descriptions of the end of the war and the liberation, national unity was often stressed. This newly won liberty opened a door to the future and marked the beginning of a new, bright chapter in history. A common characteristic in most national narratives was the glorification of the resistance movement, while in countries that had been liberated by foreign troops, domestic efforts tended to be highly praised. In addition, the 'heroisation' of the war was another common denominator in the narratives – not only were charismatic victors such as Charles de Gaulle, Winston Churchill and Josip Broz Tito designated as heroes, but also brave partisans and members of the resistance.

=== Historikerstreit ===
The Historikerstreit (German: [hɪsˈtoːʁɪkɐˌʃtʁaɪt], 'historians' dispute') (Note: The German word Streit translates variously as 'quarrel', 'dispute', or 'conflict'. The most common translation of Historikerstreit in English-language academic discourse is 'historians' dispute', although the German term is often used.) was a dispute in the late 1980s in West Germany between academics and other intellectuals about how to incorporate Nazi Germany and the Holocaust into German historiography, and more generally into the German people's view of themselves. The dispute was initiated with the Bitburg controversy, which related to a commemorative service at a German military cemetery where members of the Waffen-SS were buried. The service was attended by President of the United States Ronald Reagan, who had been invited by the West German Chancellor Helmut Kohl. The Bitburg ceremony was widely interpreted in Germany as the beginning of the "normalization" of the nation's Nazi past, and inspired a slew of criticisms and defenses that made up the initiating arguments of the Historikerstreit. The dispute quickly outgrew the initial context of the Bitburg controversy, however, and became a series of broader historiographic, political, and critical debates about how the episode of the Holocaust should be understood in Germany's history and identity.

The position taken by one faction of intellectuals, most prominently Ernst Nolte, was that the Holocaust was not unique and therefore Germans should not bear any special burden of guilt for the "Final Solution to the Jewish Question". Nolte argued that there was no moral difference between the crimes of the Soviet Union and those of Nazi Germany, and that the Nazis acted as they did out of fear of what the Soviet Union might do to Germany. Others argued that the memory of the Nazi era could not be "normalized" and be a source of national pride, and that it echoed Nazi propaganda. Other central questions and topics debated within the dispute included the singularity of the Holocaust, the functionalist and intentionalist models of the Holocaust, methodological approaches to historiography, the political utility of history, the question of whether the Holocaust ought to be studied comparatively, and ethics of public commemorations of history.

The debate attracted much media attention in West Germany, with its participants frequently giving television interviews and writing op-ed pieces in newspapers. It flared up again briefly in 2000 when Nolte, one of its leading figures, was awarded the Konrad Adenauer Prize for science.

=== Holocaust denial ===
A field of pseudohistory has emerged which attempts to deny the existence of the Holocaust and the mass extermination of Jews in German-occupied Europe. The proponents of the belief, known as Holocaust deniers or "negationists", are usually associated with Neo-Nazism and their views are rejected by professional historians.

=== War crimes of the Wehrmacht ===
At the Nuremberg Trials, the Schutzstaffel (SS) was declared a criminal organization, but the regular armed forces (Wehrmacht) were not. Although some high-ranking field marshals and generals were convicted of war crimes for issuing criminal orders, Nazi war crimes were mostly blamed on the SS-Totenkopfverbände (concentration camp guards) and the Einsatzgruppen (death squads), overlooking the participation of Wehrmacht soldiers in the Holocaust. More recent scholarship has challenged this view. An exhibition on the war crimes of the Wehrmacht sparked demonstrations.
