= Louis Léger =

French writer and pioneer in Slavic studies

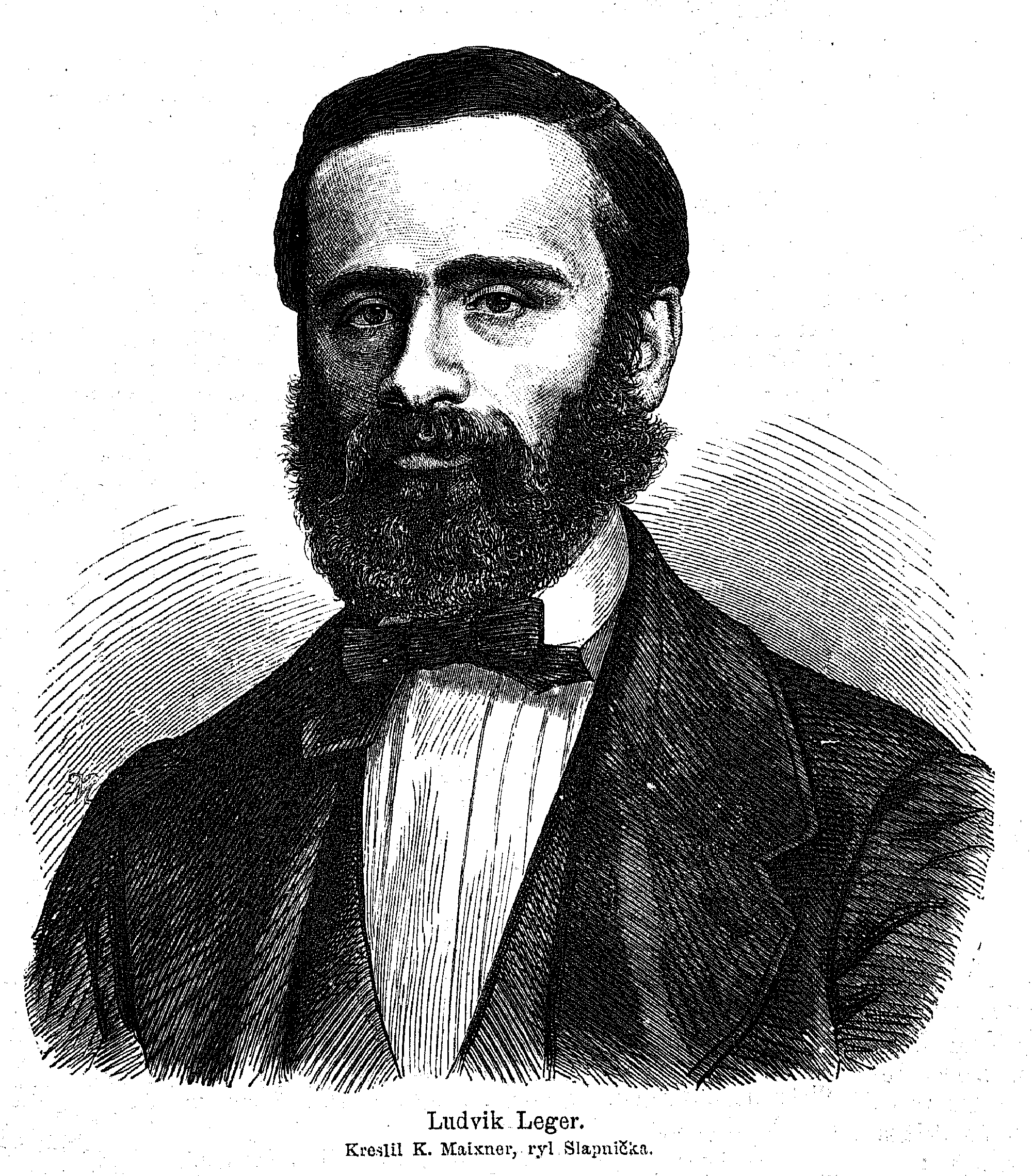
Louis Léger in Prague 1867

Louis Léger (15 January 1843 – 30 April 1923) was a French writer and pioneer in Slavic studies. He was honorary member of Bulgarian Literary Society (now Bulgarian Academy of Sciences, also member of Académie des inscriptions et belles-lettres in Paris. Academic institutions in Saint-Petersburg, Belgrade and Bucharest had given him a different status of membership.

Léger studied under Aleksander Chodźko at the Collège de France, whose position he eventually succeeded in 1885 by taking up the Slav Literature and Language chair of Adam Mickiewicz, which he occupied until 1923. Léger claimed that those who had not lived during the Second French Empire could not possibly imagine the effect of Polish influence on French society. Léger helped translate various Polish works.

His "A History of Austro-Hungary", first edition published in 1879 and last in 1920, was considered one of the best textbooks on the subject in any Western language.

In 1916, Tomáš Garrigue Masaryk and Edvard Beneš founded the Comité national tchèque in Paris, and almost at the same time Louis Eisenmann, Léger, and Ernest Denis founded the Comité national d'études, which also advocated for the independence of a Czech state. In 1918, the French government created Czechoslovak legions, which represented a significant auxiliary force at a decisive phase of the war after Russia had made peace. On 28 October 1918, the Republic of Czechoslovakia was proclaimed in Prague.

== Works ==
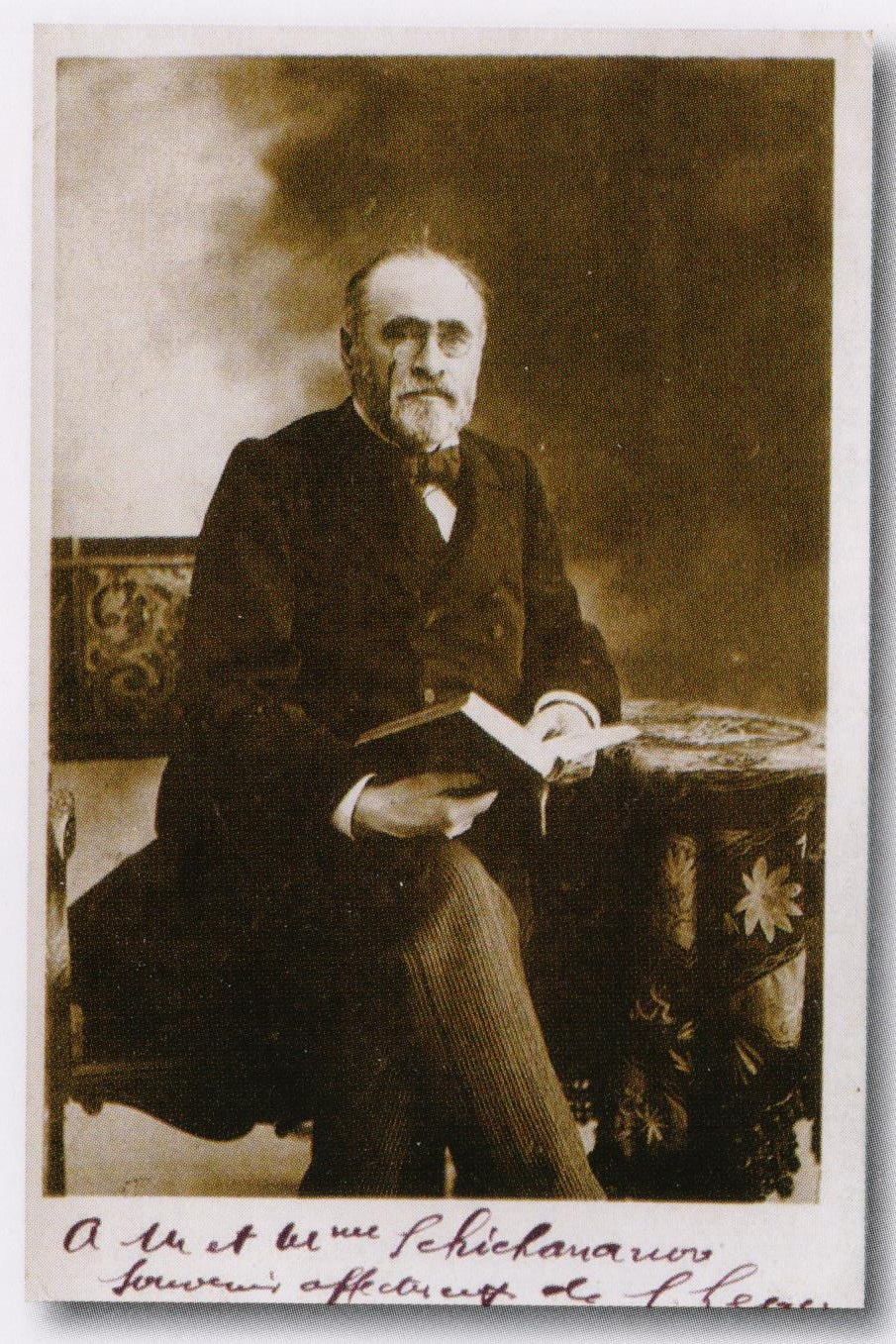
Louis Léger

- Cyrille et Méthode: étude historique sur la conversion des slaves au christianisme. Paris: A. Franck. 1868 – via Internet Archive.
- La Crise autrichienne, Paris, 1868
- Histoire de Autriche-Hongrie, Paris, 1879
- Contes Populaires Slaves, 1882
- "Cours de Louis Léger, Langues et Litératures slaves (leçon d'ouverture) Collège de France". Revue bleue politique et littéraire. 22 (1): 495. 1885 – via Gallica.
- La Bulgarie, Paris, 1885
- Nouvelles études slaves histoire et littérature, 1886
- Russes et Slaves, études politiques et littéraires, Hachette, 1890
- Notice sur L'Évangéliaire slavon de Reims, dit Texte du sacre. Reims: F. Michaud. 1899 – via Gallica.
- Le monde slave, études politiques et littéraires, Hachette, 1902
- Moscou, 1910
- Nicolas Gogol, 1913
