= Paul Allard =

French archaeologist and historian (1841 – 1916)

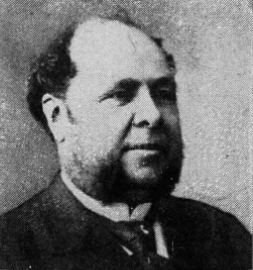
- Born: 15 September 1841; Rouen
- Died: 4 December 1916 (aged 75); Senneville-sur-Fécamp
- Occupations: Archaeologist; Historian

Paul Allard (15 September 1841 – 4 December 1916) was a French archaeologist and historian.

== Biography ==
He was admitted to the bar and practised law for a short time in his native city, where he became a judge of the civil court. His literary and his historical tastes induced him to abandon his profession and devote himself to the history of the Catholic Church in its first four centuries.

He contributed frequently to the Revue des Questions Historiques, of which he became editor in 1904, and to various other publications. In 1874 he translated James Spencer Northcote and W. R. Brownlow's Roma Sotterranea, making many additions and annotations to it.

An intimate acquaintance with Giovanni Battista de Rossi and his own studies along various lines, led him to undertake a history of the persecutions suffered by the Christians at the hand of the Roman authorities. Paul Allard and Alexander de Richemont were all closely united to de Rossi by the interests of their common work. The work was planned on very broad lines. Allard had a minute knowledge of Christian archaeology, especially in regard to the Roman Catacombs; he had studied the condition of the Christian slaves, and had a thorough acquaintance with epigraphy and the administrative and constitutional history of Rome.

== History of the Persecutions ==
The main idea of Allard's History of the Persecutions is that the Christians were unjustly treated by the Roman authorities. He did not acknowledge any incompatibility between the spread of Christianity and the permanence of the Roman Empire, though the acceptance of Christianity by the people necessarily implied the eradication of the old Roman beliefs. The action of the Roman authorities he regarded as ill-advised and brutal. According to Allard, their treatment of the Christians arose from no reasons of statesmanship or adherence to traditional policy, but was based entirely on low and unworthy motives.

The causes of the persecutions he finds in the blind hatred of the Roman authorities against this "third race", in fanaticism, or popular fury.

His conclusions have not been generally accepted.

== Works ==
His principal works are

- Rome souterraine, Paris, Didier, 1872.
- Les Esclaves chrétiens depuis les premiers temps de L’Église jusqu’à la fin de la domination romaine en Occident, Didier, 1876/1914.
- L’Art païen sous les empereurs chrétiens, Didier, 1879.
- Histoire des persécutions pendant la première moitié du troisième siècle (Septime Sévère, Maximin, Dèce), Paris, V. Lecoffre, 1881.
- Histoire des persécutions pendant les deux premiers siècles, V. Lecoffre, 1892.
- La Persécution de Dioclétien et le triomphe de L’Église, 2 vols. V. Lecoffre, 1890.
- Le Christianisme et l’empire romain, de Néron à Théodose, V. Lecoffre, 1896.
- Les Dernières Persécutions du troisième siècle (Gallus, Valérien, Aurélien), V. Lecoffre, 1898.
- Esclaves, serfs et mainmortables, V. Palmé; Brussels, J. Albanel; Geneva, H. Trembley, 1883/1894.
- Études d’histoire et d’archéologie, V. Lecoffre, 1898.
- Saint Basile (329-379), V. Lecoffre, 1899.
- Julien l’apostat, 2 vols. V. Lecoffre, 1900.
- St Sidoine Apollinaire, 431-489, Paris, J. Gabalda, 1910.
- La Maison des martyrs Saints Jean et Paul au Mont Celius, Rome, Vespasiani, 1900.
