= Wilhelm Junghans =

German historian (1834–1865)

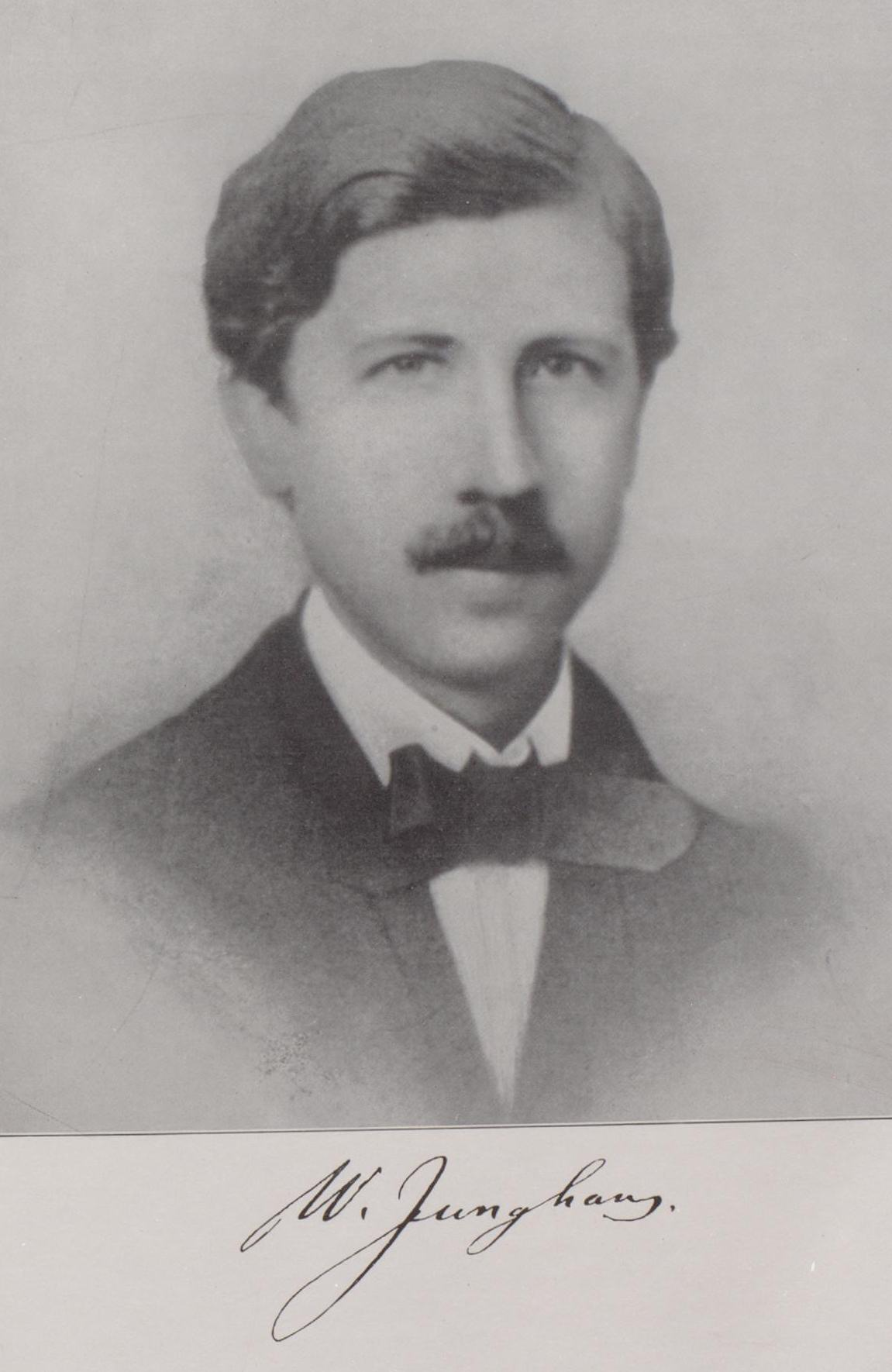

Wilhelm Junghans (3 May 1834 – 27 January 1865) was a German historian who was a native of Lüneburg.

He studied under Friedrich Wilhelm Ritschl (1806-1876) at the University of Bonn, and with Georg Waitz (1813-1886) at the University of Göttingen. In 1862 he was appointed professor at the University of Kiel, a position he held until his death in 1865 at the age of 30. At Kiel he was also secretary of the Schleswig-Holstein Historical Society.

Junghans is remembered for his 1856 work involving the Merovingian kings Childeric I and Clovis I, titled "Die Geschichte der fränkischen Könige Childerich und Chlodovech, kritisch untersucht". This book was later translated into French by historian Gabriel Monod (1844-1912) and published as "Histoire critique des règnes de Childerich et de Chlodovech".
