= Aux origines de l'Action française =

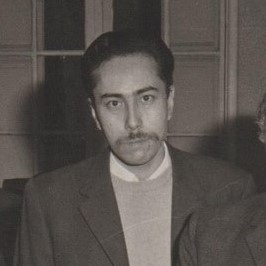
- Editor: René Rancœur
- Author: Victor Nguyen
- Original title: Aux origines de l'Action française : Intelligence et politique à l'aube du XXe siècle
- Language: French
- Series: Pour une histoire du XXe siècle
- Subject: History, Political Science
- Genre: Non-fiction
- Publisher: Fayard
- Publication date: 1991
- Publication place: France
- Media type: Print (Paperback)
- Pages: 958
- ISBN: 978-2-213-02658-9

Aux origines de l'Action française is a posthumously published and widely cited historical study by Victor Nguyen that has been described as a major contribution to the intellectual history of French nationalism. It is focused on the study of Charles Maurras and the early formation of the Action française movement.

== Background ==
Victor Nguyen took his own life on the day of his fiftieth birthday, leaving "Aux origines de l'Action française" unfinished. According to historian and sociologist Émile Poulat and professor of French literature Éric Marty, the refusal of the French National Centre for Scientific Research to bring Nguyen aboard as a researcher may have been one of the motivations for his suicide.

== Structure ==
The book has twelve chapters and is divided into three sections: the provinces of Paris, Southern France (le Midi), and the nation. In the first section, Nguyen focuses on Maurras' rise from Martigues to Paris in 1885. He also examines the young Maurras' beginnings as an editor at L'Observateur français, a Catholic and anti-Semitic newspaper. Nguyen follows Maurras' upbringing in a traditional Catholic environment but notes Maurras' turn to agnosticism at the age of fourteen due to his deafness. The second section of the thesis elaborates on the Félibrige Revival through the publication of the newspaper L'Aiòli and the rationalisation of the federalist movement around La Cocarde and the Revue Encyclopédique. The third section of the thesis concludes with the outbreak of the Dreyfus Affair in 1898.

== Reviews ==
Émile Poulat hails it as a "great thesis forever unfinished and which will not be defended".

== Bibliography ==
- Marty, Éric (1992). "Revue dAux origines de l'Action française". Esprit (182 (6)): 171–173. JSTOR 24275560.
- Nguyen, Victor (1991). Rancœur, René (ed.). Aux origines de l'Action française : Intelligence et politique à l'aube du XX^{e} siècle. Pour une histoire du XX^{e} siècle (in French). Paris: Fayard. p. 958. ISBN 978-2-213-02658-9.
- Poulat, Émile (1991). "Revue dAux origines de l'Action française". Archives de sciences sociales des religions. 36 (76): 281–282. JSTOR 30125902.
- Rebérioux, Madeleine (1992). "Revue dAux origines de l'Action française". Le Mouvement social (160): 153–155. doi:10.2307/3779244. JSTOR 3779244.
