= Revue historique =

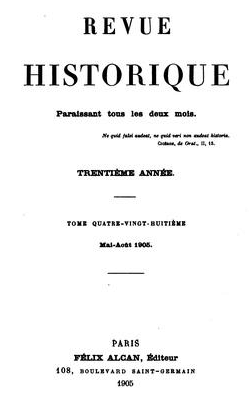
- Discipline: History
- Language: French
- Edited by: Claude Gauvard and Jean-François Sirinelli

Publication details
- History: 1876-present
- Publisher: Presses universitaires de France (France)
- Frequency: quarterly

Standard abbreviations
- ISO 4: Rev. Hist. (Paris)

Indexing
- ISSN: 0035-3264 (print); 2104-3825 (web)

Links
- Journal homepage

The Revue historique is a French academic journal founded in 1876 by the Protestant Gabriel Monod and the Catholic Gustave Fagniez. The journal was founded as a reaction against the Revue des questions historiques created ten years earlier by Ultramontanists and Legitimists. The Revue historique has been published quarterly since 1937.

The founders of the Revue historique stated that the journal was not intended to promote any particular religion, party, or doctrine. Most of its contributors came from Protestant or free thinker circles. Fagniez resigned in 1881 to protest the attacks of the Revue against the Catholic Church. Charles Bémont was an editor for the Revue from 1876 and served as a co-director until 1939.

During the last quarter of the nineteenth century, the Revue's contributors included Charles Bayet, Arthur Giry, Camille Jullian, Gustave Bloch, Ernest Lavisse, Paul Guiraud and Ernest Havet.

In the 1920s, the Revue historique was edited by Louis Eisenmann.

The Revue originated the historical method known as l'École méthodique, which is particularly associated with the names of Charles-Victor Langlois et Charles Seignobos.

René Rémond was Honorary Director until his death in 2007, as was Jean Favier who succeeded him as Honorary Director until his death in 2014.

Sébastien Charléty and Pierre Renouvin were directors before WWII. Renouvin was the sole director for a long period after WWII. In 1967 he was a co-director with Georges Duby and also Maurice Crouzet, who had been the editor-in-chief since 1929.
