= Strange Defeat =

1946 history book by Marc Bloch

- Author: Marc Bloch
- Language: French
- Publisher: Société des Éditions Franc-Tireur
- Publication date: 1946
- Publication place: France

Strange Defeat (French: L'Étrange Défaite) is a book written in mid-1940 by the French historian Marc Bloch, analyzing the then-ongoing Battle of France. Bloch was tortured and executed by the Gestapo in June 1944 for his participation in the French resistance. His book was published in 1946; English translations were published by Oxford University Press in 1949 and by W. W. Norton in 1968.

== Background ==
The book analyses on the causes of the French defeat in the Battle of France in 1940, and in part uses a relatively longue durée (long-term) view similar to that in his history scholarship (see Annales school). The thesis of the book is that the French leadership failed to recognize that, since the First World War, "the whole rhythm of modern warfare had changed its tempo". There are only three chapters: Presentation of the Witness, being a short personal history of a life devoted to historical study and interrupted by the First World War; One of the Vanquished Gives Evidence, an account of his experience in the battle of France and A Frenchman Examines His Conscience, a biting analysis of the thinking and actions of the generation in the interwar period.

== Contents ==
Bloch raised most of the issues historians have debated since. He blamed France's leadership, what that drove our armies to disaster was the cumulative effect of a great number of different mistakes. One glaring characteristic is common to all of them. Our leaders...were incapable of thinking in terms of a new war.

Guilt was widespread. Carole Fink argues that Bloch blamed the ruling class, the military and the politicians, the press and the teachers, for a flawed national policy and a weak defense against the Nazi menace, for betraying the real France and abandoning its children. Germany had won because its leaders had better understood the methods and psychology of modern combat.

Bloch reports a harsh and forthright view of the cause of the defeat as he and fellow officers saw it at the time (p. 20 of the printed French edition, p. 45 of the manuscript, written between July and September 1940)

[W]hatever the deep-seated cause of the disaster may have been, the immediate occasion was the utter incompetence of the High Command.

Bloch is also critical of the Allies, specifically of the behaviour of British soldiers and of the High Command in the retreat in Belgium.

In a revision, he added a footnote that broadened the blame to non-HQ officers (p. 68 of the printed French edition, p. 145 of the manuscript, footnote dated July 1942)

failures in the troop command were substantially less rare than I had wanted to believe in the aftermath of the defeat. ... Certainly a certain morality crisis in class groups (among reserves as well as active officers) was deeper than one dared imagine.

Chapter III then expounded on more general institutional and societal failures that hindered France's response.

== See also ==
- Historiography of the Battle of France
