= Historiography of Vichy France =

Study of how historians portray Vichy France

The historiography of Vichy France, is the study in which historians and researchers in the human sciences analyse the regime of Vichy France (which de facto governed the metropolitan territory of France from June 1940 to August 1944), and was one of the most debated topics in French historical research during the 1980s and 1990s.

== The major stages of historiography ==
The historiography of the Vichy regime can be divided into three main stages.

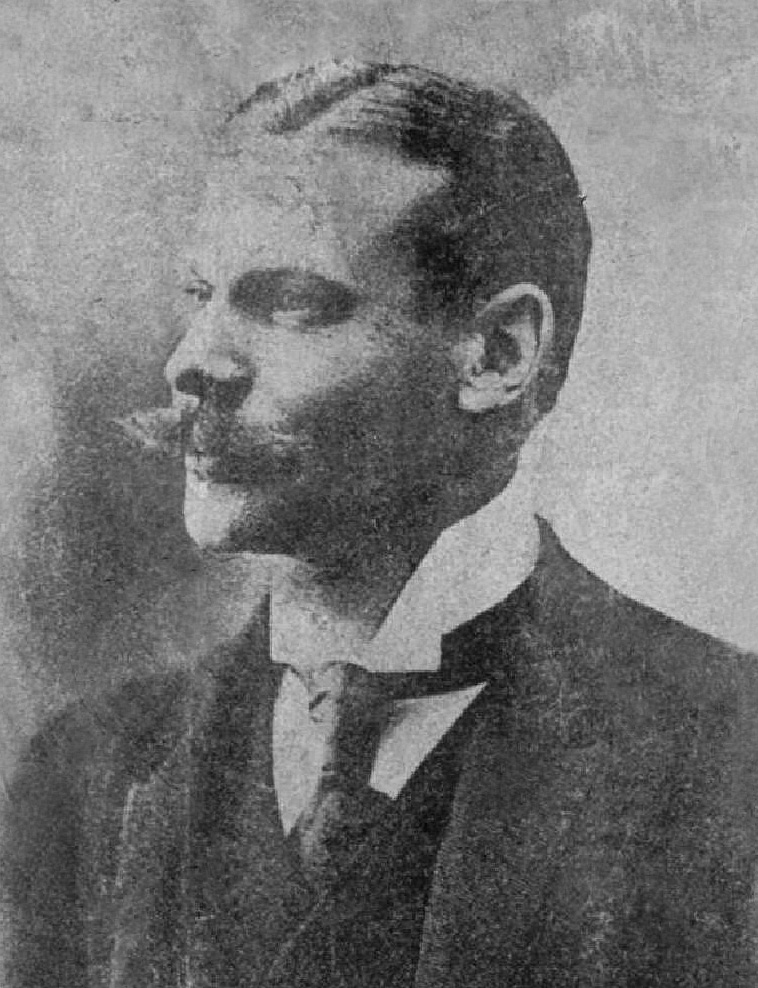
André Siegfried in 1910.

This phase is marked by the work of the essayist and academic Robert Aron (History of Vichy, 1954), who focuses particularly on Vichy's relations with Germany, and the sociologist and geographer André Siegfried (From the Third to the Fourth Republic, 1956), who is more attached to the internal functioning of the regime. With hindsight, its main characteristic seems to be to distinguish between a "good Vichy", dominated by the figure of Marshal Pétain (1940–1942) and who would have played a kind of double game with Germany, and a "bad Vichy", dominated by the figure of Pierre Laval (1942–1944), fully collaborationist.

Robert Aron, like many of his contemporaries, had based himself mainly on the abundant legal archives of the Liberation trials, but he failed to point out the bias in the testimonies for or against him in such a context. With a "soothing Pétainism" according to historian Julian Jackson, he had gone to great lengths to appear impartial.

In any case, this production is part of an era dominated by the "resistance myth" which made collaboration the business of a minority in a France which was mainly resistant, if not in action then at least in thought.

=== The search for the responsibilities of the French State (1970s–1980s) ===
The major work of the American historian Robert Paxton (Columbia University, New York) (Vichy France, USA, 1972 and France, 1973) based in particular on German archives, as well as the broadcast of the film Le chagrin et la pitié, 1969) will reveal to French society, which turns the page of historical Gaullism with the death of Charles de Gaulle (1970), another face of the Vichy regime.

==== The question of collaboration ====
Paxton's book, which is intended as a response to Robert Aron's soothing work, reveals that the Vichy regime sought collaboration with Nazi Germany from the beginning and that the anti-Semitic policy of the French state was not imposed by Germany, but was desired in full autonomy by the French state.

Then began a phase of collective introspection which would lead in particular to the recognition in 1995 by the President of the Republic Jacques Chirac of the responsibility of the State of France in the genocide of Jews in France (speech by Jacques Chirac on 16 July 1995 at the Vélodrome d'Hiver).

==== The question of the nature of the regime: French fascism? ====
More incidentally, Paxton thus gives substance to the French state's social project (the "National Revolution" and the reforms undertaken within or outside this framework), which will also constitute a fertile area of research for historians in the following decades.

Research into the nature of the regime was also revived and deepened by the French-American political science professor Stanley Hoffmann (Harvard) (Essay on France, Decline or Renewal, 1974). He analyses the Vichy regime as a pluralist dictatorship, an expression used from 1956 which will be widely used thereafter.

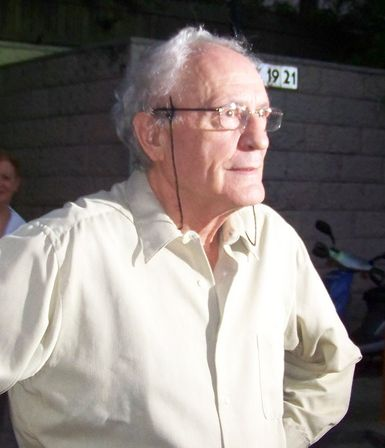
Zeev Sternhell in 2008.

This is where the debates about the fascist nature of the Vichy regime began. The broader analyses of the origins of fascism by the French-Israeli historian Zeev Sternhell (University of Jerusalem) led him to argue that fascist ideology, or at least a fascist ideology, arose in France from an anti-liberal and anti-rationalist reaction. His broad interpretation of French fascism led him to de facto include elements of the Vichy regime, even though it was not his direct object of study.

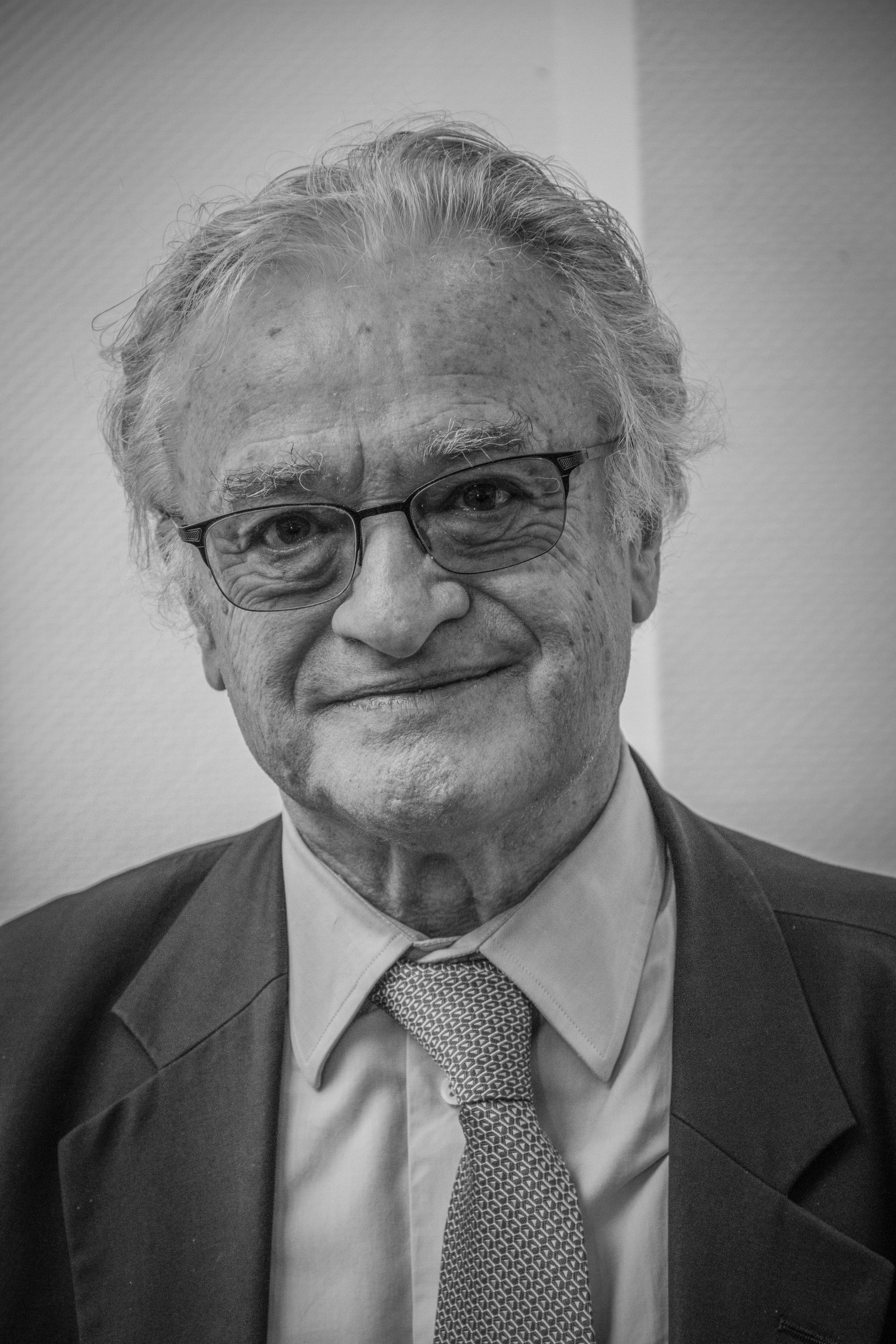
Alain-Gérard Slama in 2013.

Zeev Sternhell's theses were criticized by the "French School", composed in particular of the historian René Rémond (FNSP), Serge Berstein (IEP of Paris), Alain-Gérard Slama (IEP of Paris) who believe that republican culture was too deeply integrated into French society.

From a communist perspective, historians Robert Bourderon (Was the Vichy regime fascist? in Review of the History of the Second World War, July 1973) and Germaine Willard (History of Contemporary France, volume IV, Éditions sociales, 1980) believe that the Vichy regime was, like other fascist regimes, an adaptation of big capital.

The historian Yves Durand speaks of an evolution of Vichy towards fascism after the weight of conservative elements was predominant at the beginning of the regime (France in the Second World War, 1939–1945, Paris, Armand Colin, 1989).

In this sense other sources include:

- the historian Denis Peschanski (CNRS), qui insiste sur les tentatives fascistes de Vichy (Vichy au singulier, Vichy au pluriel. Une tentative avortée d'encadrement de la société. 1941–1942), in Annales : économies, sociétés, civilisations, No. 43, 1988, pages 639–662).
- the historian Pierre Milza (IEP de Paris), qui parle de "dérive totalitaire" et de "fascisation" du régime à partir de 1942 (Les fascismes, 1985).

The Swiss historian Philippe Burrin (Graduate Institute of International Studies (HEI) in Geneva) denies Vichy the qualification of fascist because of the elements that he considers consubstantial with fascism: the project of conquest, the test of war (Fascism, Nazism, Authoritarianism, Points Seuil, History, 2000).

=== Thematic studies (1990s–2000s) ===
The 1990s and 2000s were marked by the proliferation of thematic and sectoral studies on various aspects of French society under the Vichy regime: the study of state bodies (police, judiciary, civil servants in general), the study of sectoral policies of the French state (youth policy, cultural project, social policy, etc.), the study of civil society (businesses under occupation, etc.).

These studies, based in particular on private archives and in any case unexploited, have made it possible to considerably clarify the life and developments that took place under the Vichy regime. In a context of "repentance" and transparency, but also because the years had passed, public and private institutions have relaxed their traditional reflex of corporatist defense and gradually opened their archives, even if it meant revealing dark elements of their history. Introspection of the functioning of the French administration was also pushed by the Papon trial in 1997.

These studies clarified several elements on the collaboration and crimes of the Vichy regime.

These studies also raised the question of the continuity of the Vichy regime with the previous regime as well as with the following regimes in terms of administrative continuity, rise of technical power, state control over society, development of the social wage alongside income from work, etc.

Among the main thematic studies on the State, administration and civil servants:

- Senior officials : François Bloch-Lainé; Claude Gruson (1996). Hauts fonctionnaires sous l'Occupation (in French). Paris: Odile Jacob. p. 283. ISBN 978-2-7381-0419-9. OCLC 413934139.
- Cvil servant : Marc-Olivier Baruch (1997). Servir l'État français l'administration en France de 1940 à 1944. Pour une histoire du 20th century (in French). Paris: Fayard. p. 737. ISBN 978-2-213-59930-4. OCLC 708347051.
- Civil servants : Vincent Duclert (dir.), Serviteurs de l'État français, une histoire politique de l'administration 1875-1945, Paris, La Découverte, 2000.
- direction du budget : La direction du Budget entre doctrines et réalité, 1919–1944, Paris, CHEFF, 2001.
- Juristes : Michèle Cointet, Les juristes sous l'Occupation : la tentation du pétainisme et le choix de la Résistance, in Gueslin, André (1994). Les facs sous Vichy: étudiants, universitaires et Universités de France pendant la Seconde Guerre mondiale: actes du colloque des Universités de Clermont-Ferrand et de Strasbourg: Novembre 1993 (in French). Clermont-Ferrand: Institut d'Etudes du Massif Central, Université Blaise-Pascal (Clermont II. p. 371. ISBN 978-2-87741-068-7. OCLC 243806389., pages 51–64.
- Justice : Alain Bancaud, Vichy et la tradition de l'étatisation de la justice : histoire d'un demi-succès, in Serviteurs de l'État, etc., 2000.
- Amry : Robert Paxton (2005). L'armée de Vichy: le corps des officiers français, 1940–1944 (in French). Translated by Pierre de Longuemar. Paris: Tallandier. p. 586. ISBN 978-2-02-067988-6. OCLC 861062813.
- Police : Maurice Rajsfus (1995). La police de Vichy. Documents (in French). Paris: Cherche-Midi. p. 286. ISBN 978-2-86274-358-5. OCLC 33362188.
- Police : Jean-Marc Berlière; Laurent Chabrun (2009). Policiers français sous l'occupation. Tempus (in French). Paris: Perrin. p. 468. ISBN 978-2-262-02978-4. OCLC 494655765.
- Écoles : Jean-Michel Barreau (2001). Vichy, contre l'école de la République: théoriciens et théories scolaires de la "Révolution nationale" (in French). Paris: Flammarion. p. 334. ISBN 978-2-08-067998-7.
- Universities : Claude Singer (1992). Vichy, l'université et les juifs. Histoire (in French). Paris: Belles Lettres. p. 437. ISBN 978-2-251-38017-9. OCLC 34080226.
- École polytechnique : Marc-Olivier Baruch; Vincent Guigueno (2000). Le choix des X: l'Ecole polytechnique et les polytechniciens: 1939-1945. Paris: Fayard. p. 349. ISBN 978-2-213-60851-8. OCLC 406531338.
- SNCF : Bachelier, Christian (2000). La SNCF sous l'occupation allemande, 1940-1944 rapport documentaire (in French). Institut d'histoire du temps présent, CNRS. OCLC 491760953.

Among the main studies on Vichy policies:

- Wilfred Douglas Halls, Les jeunes et la politique de Vichy, Angleterre, 1981 et Syros, 1988.
- Christian Faure (1989). Le projet culturel de Vichy. Lyon Paris: CNRS, Centre régional de publication de Lyon Presses universitaires de Lyon Diffusion, Presses du CNRS. p. 335. ISBN 978-2-222-04266-2. OCLC 20454630.
- Philippe-Jean Hesse; Jean-Pierre Le Crom (2001). La protection sociale sous le régime de Vichy. Histoire (in French). Rennes: Presses universitaires de Rennes. p. 377. ISBN 978-2-86847-603-6. OCLC 422180527.

On other actors in society:

- Claire Andrieu (1990). La banque sous l'Occupation: paradoxes de l'histoire d'une profession: 1936–1946 (in French). Paris: Presses de la Fondation nationale des sciences politiques. p. 331. ISBN 978-2-7246-0587-7. OCLC 23766049.
- Olivier Dard, Jean-Claude Daumas, François Marcot (dir.), L'Occupation, l'État français et les entreprises, Actes du colloque organisé à Besançon, Paris ADHE, 2000.
- Nicolas Chevassus-au-Louis (2004). Savants sous l'Occupation: enquête sur la vie scientifique française entre 1940 et 1944. Science ouverte (in French). Paris: Éd. du Seuil. p. 251. ISBN 978-2-02-061333-0. OCLC 470227458.

== See also ==
=== Related articles ===
- Historiography of the British Empire
- Historiography of the French Revolution
- Historiography of the Battle of France

=== External links ===
- Christophe Capuano (Université de Bourgogne), Le régime de Vichy : un fascisme à la française ?, Plan académique de formation, Académie de Bourgogne, 2004
- Henry Rousso (Institut d'histoire du temps présent), Le syndrome de Vichy (1944–1987), analysé par hervé Coutau-Bégarie in Politique étrangère, 1988, volume 53, No. 3, page 784
- Jean Viaud (université de Bretagne Ouest, Brest), Représentations du régime de Vichy ou « se souvenir de ne pas oublier », in Temporalités, 2005 Consulté le 05 novembre 2009.
- Jean-Pierre Le Crom (CNRS), Historiographie du droit de Vichy, in Histoire@Politique. Politique, culture, société, No. 9, septembre-décembre 2009

=== Bibliography ===
- Fondation nationale des sciences politiques (Paris). Colloque. 1970. Paris, Le Gouvernement de Vichy, Institutions et politiques (Rapports et extraits des débats du colloque qui s'est tenu à la Fondation nationale des sciences politiques les 6 et 7 mars 1970), présentation en ligne.
- Robert Aron; Georgette Elgey (1969). Histoire de Vichy. Grandes études contemporaines (in French). Paris: Fayard. p. 767.
- André Siegfried (1956). De la III^{e} à la IV^{e} république (in French). Paris: Grasset. p. 1956.
- Henri Michel, Vichy, année 1940, Robert Laffont, 1967.
- Eberhard Jäckel, Frankreich in Hitlers Europa – Die deutsche Frankreichpolitik im Zweiten Weltkrieg, Deutsche Verlag-Anstalg GmbH, Stuttgart, 1966 ; traduction : La France dans l'Europe de Hitler (préface de Alfred Grosser, traduction de Denise Meunier), Fayard, coll. « Les grandes études contemporaines », 1968, 554 p. (in German)
- Henri Michel, Pétain et le régime de Vichy, Presses Universitaires de France, coll. "Que sais-je ?", 1978.
- Paxton, Robert (1973). La France de Vichy 1940–1944. L'Univers historique. Translated by Claude Bertrand. Paris: Éditions du Seuil. p. 375. OCLC 36302784.
  Reprint: Paxton, Robert (November 1997) [1973]. La France de Vichy 1940-1944. Points Histoire. Translated by Claude Bertrand. Paris: Éditions du Seuil. ISBN 978-2-02-039210-5.
- Henri Amouroux, La Grande Histoire des Français sous l'occupation, 10 volumes, Éditions Robert Laffont, Paris, 1975-1993.
- Dreyfus, François-Georges (1990). Histoire de Vichy (in French). Paris: Perrin. p. 818. ISBN 2-262-00745-4.

==== Historiographical studies ====
- Michel, Henri (1956). "Lumières sur Vichy ?". Annales. Économies, Sociétés, Civilisations. 11 (4 (11th année)). Paris: Armand Colin: 510–525. doi:10.3406/ahess.1956.2582.
- Rousso, Henry (1987). Le syndrome de Vichy. 20th century (in French). Paris: Seuil. p. 378. ISBN 2-02-009772-9.
- Jean-Pierre Azema; François Bédarida (1992). "Vichy et la mémoire savante : quarante-cinq ans d'historiographie". Le régime de Vichy et les Français. Pour une histoire du 20th century. Paris: Fayard. p. 788. ISBN 978-2-213-02683-1. OCLC 35830702.
- Conan, Eric; Henry Rousso (1994). Vichy. Pour une histoire du 20th century (in French). Paris: Fayard. p. 327. ISBN 2-213-59237-3. LCCN 95125277.
