= Gabriel Monod =

French historian (1844–1912)

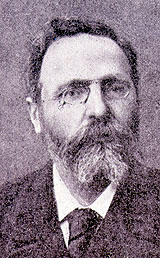
Gabriel Monod.

Gabriel Monod (7 March 1844 – 10 April 1912) was a French historian, the nephew of Adolphe Monod.

== Biography ==
Born in Ingouville, Seine-Maritime, he was educated at Le Havre then went to Paris to complete his education, lodging with the de Pressensé family. The influence of Edmond de Pressensé, a pastor and large-minded theologian, and of Madame de Pressensé, a woman of superior intellect and refined feeling, who devoted her life to educational works and charity, made a great impression on him. In 1865 he left the École normale supérieure, and went to Germany, where he studied at the University of Göttingen and Humboldt University in Berlin. The teaching of Georg Waitz definitely directed his studies towards the history of the Middle Ages. Returning to France in 1868 he was nominated by Victor Duruy to give lectures on history, following the method used in German seminaries, at the École des hautes études.

When the Franco-Prussian War broke out, Gabriel Monod, with his cousins Alfred and Sarah Monod, organized an ambulance with which he followed the whole campaign, from Sedan to Le Mans. He wrote a small book of memoirs of this campaign, Allemands et Français (1871), in which he spoke of the conquerors without bitterness; this attitude was all the more praiseworthy as his mother was originally from Alsace, and he was unable to resign himself to the loss of Alsace and Lorraine.

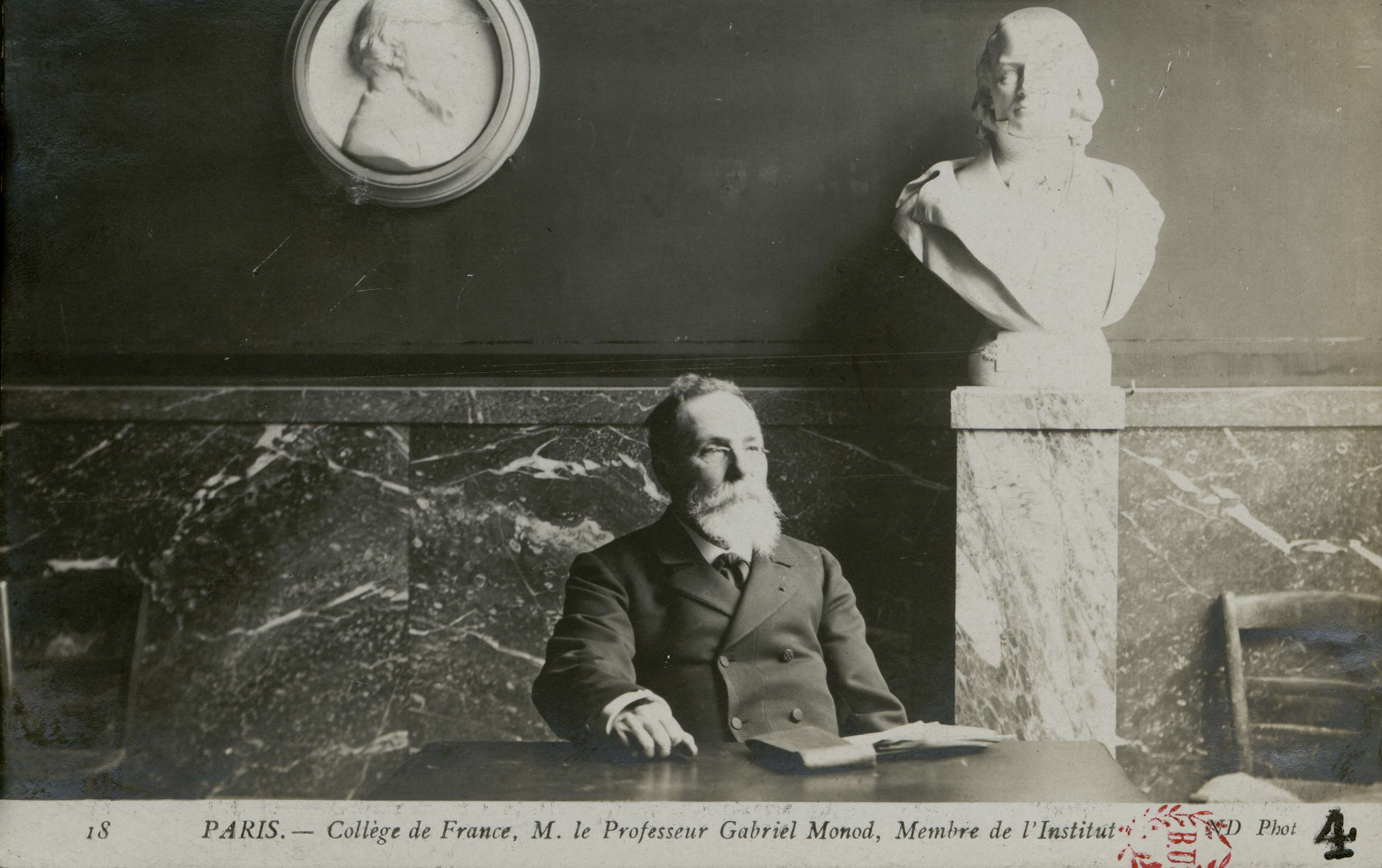
Collège de France. Professor Gabriel Monod (Bibliothèque de la Sorbonne, NuBIS)

The war being over he returned to teaching. At this period of his life he wrote Grégoire de Tours et Marius d'Avenche (1872); Frédégaire, whose history, taken from original manuscripts, he published in 1885; a translation of a book of W. Junghans, Histoire critique des règnes de Childerich et de Chlodovech, with introduction and notes (1879); Études critiques sur les sources de l'histoire carolingienne (1898, 1st part only published); and Bibliographie de l'histoire de France (1888). He himself said that his pupils were his best books; he intended to teach them not so much new facts as the way to study, endeavouring to develop in them an idea of criticism and truth. They showed their gratitude by dedicating a book to him in 1896, Études d'histoire du moyen âge, and after his retirement in 1905 by having his features engraved on a slab (see À Gabriel Monod, en souvenir de son enseignement: École pratique des hautes études, 1868–1905, École normale supérieure, 1880–1904. 26 May 1907).

Monod married Olga Herzen, daughter of Russian political thinker Alexander Herzen, in 1873.

In 1876 he founded the Revue Historique, which rapidly became a great authority on scientific education. Some of his articles in this and other periodicals were put together in book form, Les Maîtres de l'histoire: Ernest Renan, Hippolyte Taine, Jules Michelet (1894); Portraits et souvenirs (1897: on Victor Hugo, Fustel de Coulanges, Victor Duruy, etc.) In 1903 he published Souvenirs d'adolescence, and in 1905 Études sur Michelet, sa vie et ses Œuvres.

Gabriel Monod died in 1912 in Versailles and is buried there in the Cimetière des Gonards.
