= Historiography =

Study of the methods used by historians

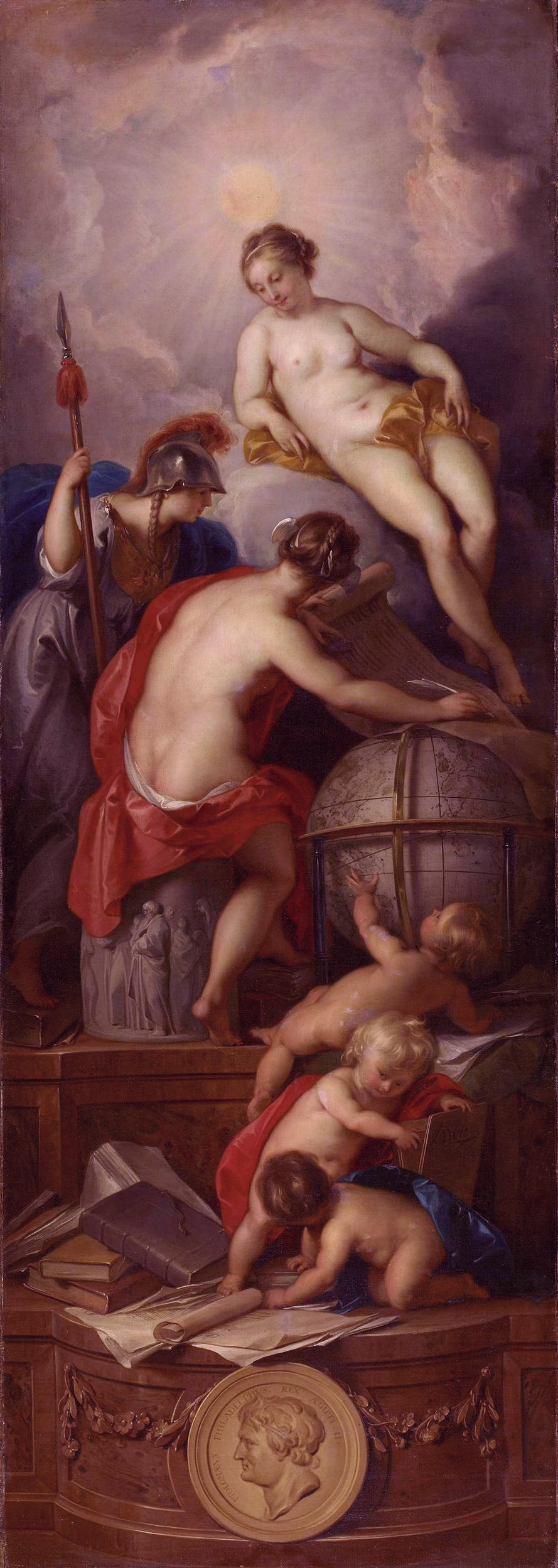
The Allegory On the Writing of History shows Truth (top) watching the historian write history, while advised by Wisdom (Jacob de Wit, 1754)

Historiography is the study of the methods used by historians in developing history as an academic discipline. By extension, the term historiography is any body of historical work on a particular subject. The historiography of a specific topic covers how historians have studied that topic by using particular sources, techniques of research, and theoretical approaches to the interpretation of documentary sources. Scholars discuss historiography by topic—such as the historiography of the United Kingdom, of WWII, of the pre-Columbian Americas, of early Islam, and of China—and different approaches to the work and the genres of history, such as political history and social history. Beginning in the nineteenth century, the development of academic history produced a great corpus of historiographic literature. The extent to which historians are influenced by their own groups and loyalties—such as to their nation state—remains a debated question.

In Europe, the academic discipline of historiography was established in the 5th century BC with the Histories, by Herodotus, who thus established Greek historiography. In the 2nd century BC, the Roman statesman Cato the Elder produced the Origines, which is the first Roman historiography. In Asia, the father and son intellectuals Sima Tan and Sima Qian established Chinese historiography with the Shiji, in the Han Empire. During the Middle Ages, medieval historiography included the works of chronicles in medieval Europe, the Ethiopian Empire in the Horn of Africa, Islamic histories by Muslim historians, and Korean and Japanese histories based on the existing Chinese model. During the 18th-century Age of Enlightenment, historiography in the Western world was shaped and developed by figures such as Voltaire, David Hume, and Edward Gibbon, who among others set the foundations for the modern discipline. In the 19th century, historical studies became professionalized at universities and research centers along with a belief that history was like a science. In the 20th century, historians incorporated social science dimensions like politics, economy, and culture in their historiography.

The research interests of historians change over time, and there has been a shift away from traditional diplomatic, economic, and political history toward newer approaches, especially social and cultural studies. From 1975 to 1995 the proportion of professors of history in American universities identifying with social history increased from 31 to 41 percent, while the proportion of political historians decreased from 40 to 30 percent. In 2007, of 5,723 faculty members in the departments of history at British universities, 1,644 (29 percent) identified themselves with social history and 1,425 (25 percent) identified themselves with political history. Since the 1980s there has been a special interest in the memories and commemoration of past events—the histories as remembered and presented for popular celebration.

== Terminology ==
In the early modern period, the term historiography meant "the writing of history", and historiographer meant "historian". In that sense certain official historians were given the title "Historiographer Royal" in Sweden (from 1618), England (from 1660), and Scotland (from 1681). The Scottish post is still in existence.

Historiography was more recently defined as "the study of the way history has been and is written—the history of historical writing", which means that, "When you study 'historiography' you do not study the events of the past directly, but the changing interpretations of those events in the works of individual historians."

== History ==
=== Antiquity ===
Understanding the past appears to be a universal human need, and the "telling of history" has emerged independently in civilizations around the world. What constitutes history is a philosophical question (see philosophy of history). The earliest chronologies date back to ancient Egypt and Sumerian/Akkadian Mesopotamia, in the form of chronicles and annals. However, most historical writers in these early civilizations were not known by name, and their works usually did not contain narrative structures or detailed analysis. By contrast, the term "historiography" is taken to refer to written history recorded in a narrative format for the purpose of informing future generations about events. In this limited sense, "ancient history" begins with the written history of early historiography in Classical Antiquity, established in 5th century BC Classical Greece.

=== Europe ===
==== Greece ====
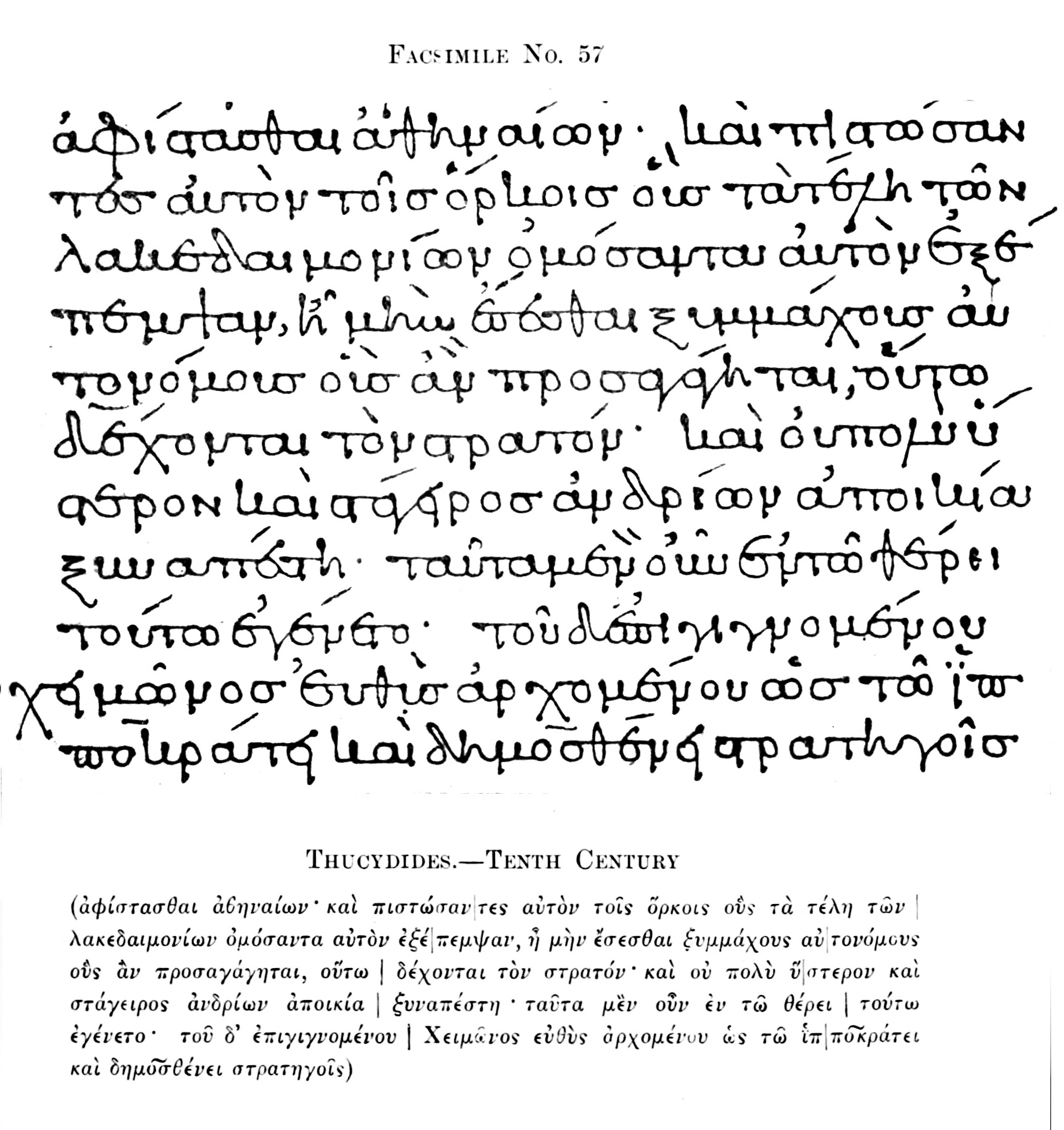
Reproduction of part of a tenth-century copy of Thucydides's History of the Peloponnesian War

The earliest known systematic historical thought and methodologies emerged in ancient Greece and the wider Greek world, a development which would be an important influence on the writing of history elsewhere around the Mediterranean region. The tradition of logography in Archaic Greece preceded the full narrative form of historiography, in which logographers such as Hecataeus of Miletus provided prose compilations about places in geography and peoples in an early form of cultural anthropology, as well as speeches used in courts of law. The earliest known fully narrative critical historical works were The Histories, composed by Herodotus of Halicarnassus (484–425 BC) who became known as the "father of history". Herodotus attempted to distinguish between more and less reliable accounts, and personally conducted research by travelling extensively, giving written accounts of various Mediterranean cultures. Although Herodotus' overall emphasis lay on the actions and characters of men, he also attributed an important role to divinity in the determination of historical events.

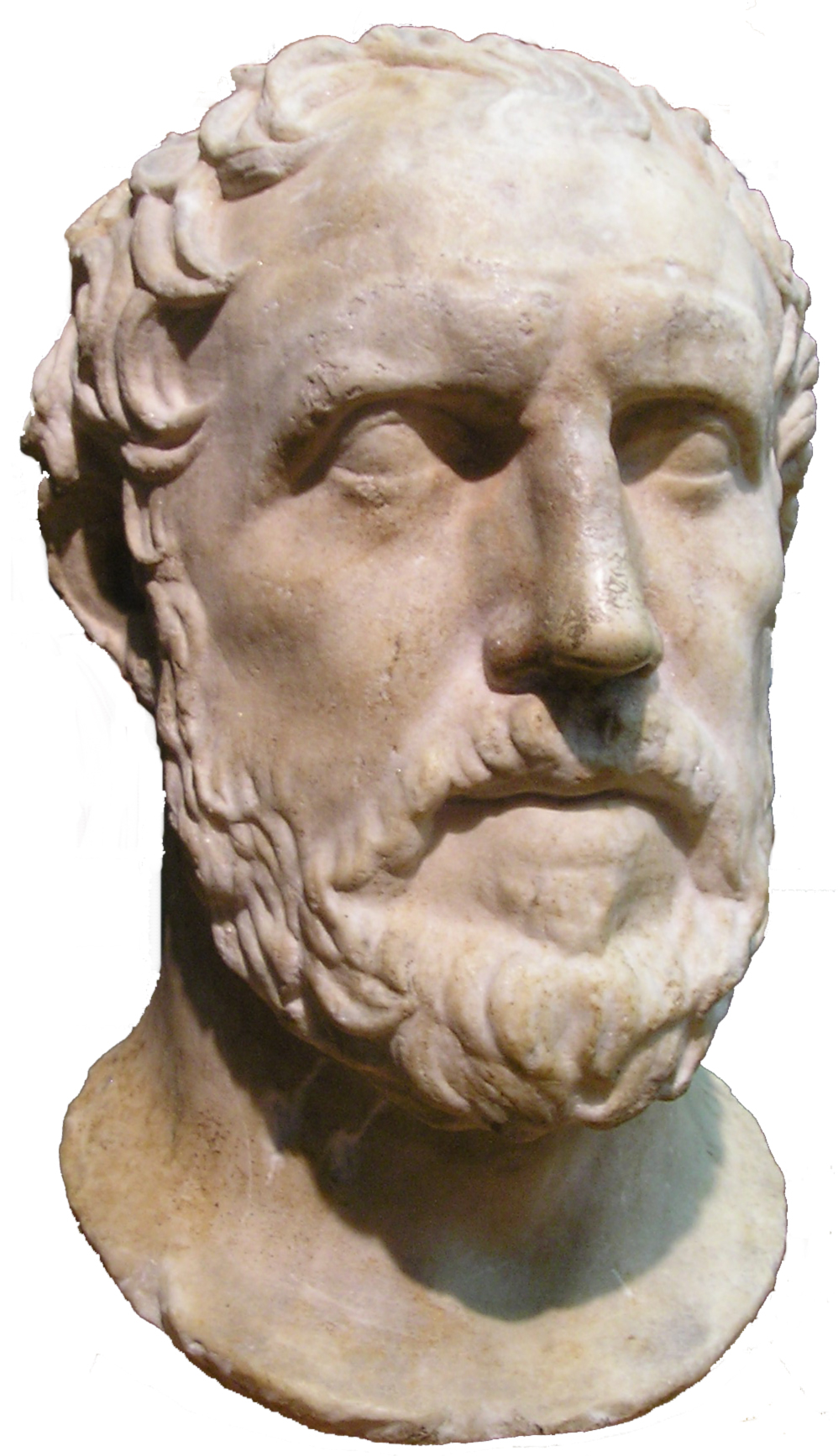
Bust of Thucydides, Hellenistic copy of a 4th-century BC work

The generation following Herodotus witnessed a spate of local histories of the individual city-states (poleis), written by the first of the local historians who employed the written archives of city and sanctuary. Dionysius of Halicarnassus characterized these historians as the forerunners of Thucydides, and these local histories continued to be written into Late Antiquity, as long as the city-states survived. Two early figures stand out: Hippias of Elis, who produced the lists of winners in the Olympic Games that provided the basic chronological framework as long as the pagan classical tradition lasted, and Hellanicus of Lesbos, who compiled more than two dozen histories from civic records, all of them now lost.

Thucydides largely eliminated divine causality in his account of the war between Athens and Sparta, establishing a rationalistic element which set a precedent for subsequent Western historical writings. He was also the first to distinguish between cause and immediate origins of an event, while his successor Xenophon (c. 431 – 355 BC) introduced autobiographical elements and biographical character studies in his Anabasis.

The proverbial Philippic attacks of the Athenian orator Demosthenes (384–322 BC) on Philip II of Macedon marked the height of ancient political agitation. The now lost history of Alexander's campaigns by the diadoch Ptolemy I (367–283 BC) may represent the first historical work composed by a ruler. Polybius (c. 203 – 120 BC) wrote on the rise of the Roman Republic to world prominence, and attempted to harmonize the Greek and Roman points of view. Diodorus Siculus composed a universal history, the Bibliotheca historica, that sought to explain various known civilizations from their origins up until his own day in the 1st century BC.

Berossus, a Chaldean priest (fl. 3rd century BC) composed a Greek-language History of Babylonia for the Seleucid king Antiochus I, combining Hellenistic methods of historiography and Mesopotamian accounts to form a unique composite. Reports exist of other near-eastern histories, such as that of the Phoenician historian Sanchuniathon; but he is considered semi-legendary and writings attributed to him are fragmentary, known only through the later historians Philo of Byblos and Eusebius, who asserted that he wrote before even the Trojan War. The native Egyptian priest and historian Manetho composed a history of Egypt in Greek for the Ptolemaic royal court during the 3rd century BC.

==== Rome ====
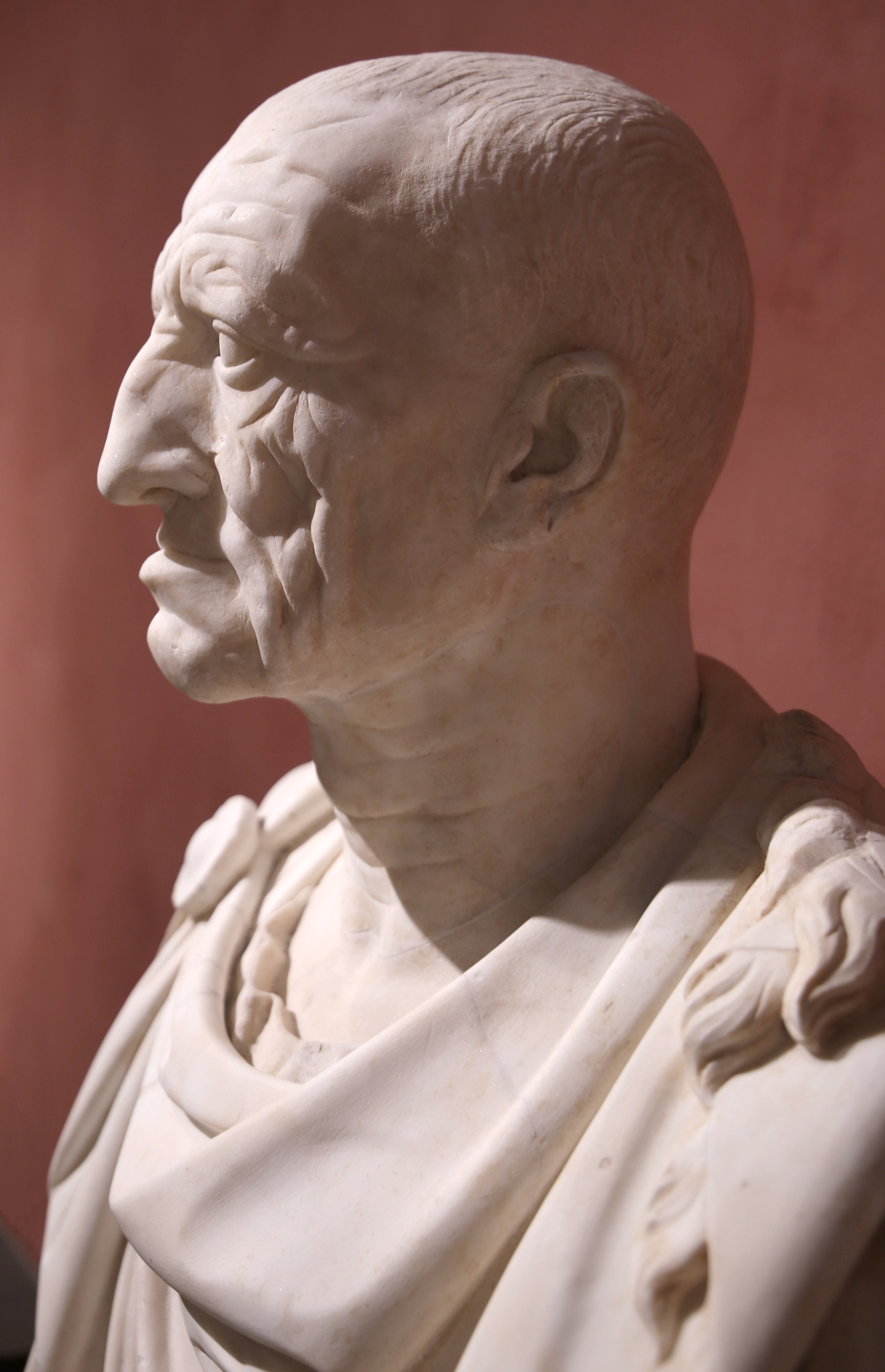
The Roman bust traditionally identified as Cato the Elder

The Romans adopted the Greek tradition, writing at first in Greek, but eventually chronicling their history in a freshly non-Greek language. Early Roman works were still written in Greek, such as the annals of Quintus Fabius Pictor. However, the Origines, composed by the Roman statesman Cato the Elder (234–149 BC), was written in Latin, in a conscious effort to counteract Greek cultural influence. It marked the beginning of Latin historical writings. Hailed for its lucid style, Julius Caesar's (103–44 BC) de Bello Gallico exemplifies autobiographical war coverage. The politician and orator Cicero (106–43 BC) introduced rhetorical elements in his political writings.

Strabo (63 BC – c. 24 AD) was an important exponent of the Greco-Roman tradition of combining geography with history, presenting a descriptive history of peoples and places known to his era. The Roman historian Sallust (86–35 BC) sought to analyze and document what he viewed as the decline of the Republican Roman state and its virtues, highlighted in his respective narrative accounts of the Catilinarian conspiracy and the Jugurthine War. Livy (59 BC – 17 AD) records the rise of Rome from city-state to empire. His speculation about what would have happened if Alexander the Great had marched against Rome represents the first known instance of alternate history.

Biography, although popular throughout antiquity, was introduced as a branch of history by the works of Plutarch (c. 45 – 125 AD) and Suetonius (c. 69 – after 130 AD) who described the deeds and characters of ancient personalities, stressing their human side. Tacitus (c. 56 – c. 117 AD) denounces Roman immorality by praising German virtues, elaborating on the topos of the Noble savage. Tacitus' focus on personal character can also be viewed as pioneering work in psychohistory. Although rooted in Greek historiography, in some ways Roman historiography shared traits with Chinese historiography, lacking speculative theories and instead relying on annalistic forms, revering ancestors, and imparting moral lessons for their audiences, laying the groundwork for medieval Christian historiography.

==== Biblical ====
Biblical historiography is the study of the writing of history in the context of the Hebrew Bible, and covers from the 12th century BC to the mid-4th century BC with a revival during the Hasmonean period in the second century BC. It encompasses two main trends: a quasi-secular approach focusing on political history, and a kerygmatic approach emphasizing divine action and moral lessons.

=== East Asia ===
==== China ====
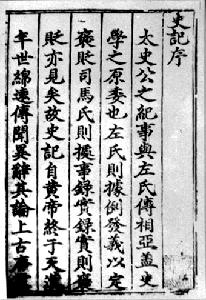
First page of the Shiji

The Han dynasty eunuch Sima Qian (145–86 BC) was the first in China to lay the groundwork for professional historical writing. His work superseded the older style of the Spring and Autumn Annals, compiled in the 5th century BC, the Bamboo Annals, the Classic of History, and other court and dynastic annals that recorded history in a chronological form that abstained from analysis and focused on moralistic teaching. In 281 AD the tomb of King Xiang of Wei (d. 296 BC) was opened, inside of which was found a historical text called the Bamboo Annals, after the writing material. It is similar in style to the Spring and Autumn Annals and covers events from the mythical Yellow Emperor to 299 BC. Opinions on the authenticity of the text has varied throughout the centuries, and it was rediscovered too late to gain the same status as the Spring and Autumn Annals.

Sima's Shiji (Records of the Grand Historian), initiated by his father the court astronomer Sima Tan (165–110 BC), pioneered the "Annals-biography" format, which would become the standard for prestige history writing in China. In this genre a history opens with a chronological outline of court affairs, and then continues with detailed biographies of prominent people who lived during the period in question. The scope of his work extended as far back as the 16th century BC with the founding of the Shang dynasty. It included many treatises on specific subjects and individual biographies of prominent people. He also explored the lives and deeds of commoners, both contemporary and those of previous eras.

Whereas Sima's had been a universal history from the beginning of time down to the time of writing, his successor Ban Gu wrote an annals-biography history limiting its coverage to only the Western Han dynasty, the Book of Han (96 AD). This established the notion of using dynastic boundaries as start- and end-points, and most later Chinese histories would focus on a single dynasty or group of dynasties.

The Records of the Grand Historian and Book of Han were eventually joined by the Book of the Later Han (AD 488) (replacing the earlier, and now only partially extant, Han Records from the Eastern Pavilion) and the Records of the Three Kingdoms (AD 297) to form the "Four Histories". These became mandatory reading for the Imperial Examinations and have therefore exerted an influence on Chinese culture comparable to the Confucian Classics. More annals-biography histories were written in subsequent dynasties, eventually bringing the number to between twenty-four and twenty-six, but none ever reached the popularity and impact of the first four.

Traditional Chinese historiography describes history in terms of dynastic cycles. In this view, each new dynasty is founded by a morally righteous founder. Over time, the dynasty becomes morally corrupt and dissolute. Eventually, the dynasty becomes so weak as to allow its replacement by a new dynasty.

=== Middle Ages to Renaissance ===
==== Christendom ====
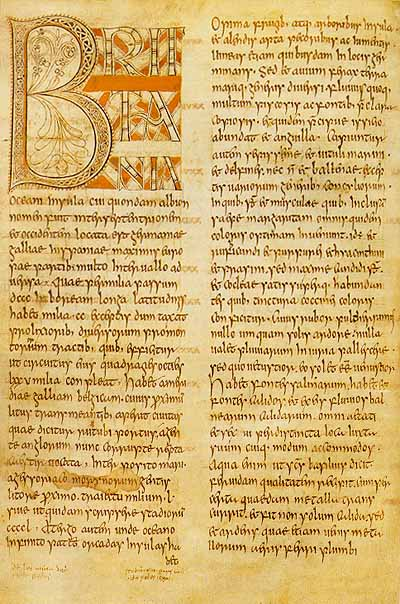
A page of Bede's Ecclesiastical History of the English People

The shared author of the Gospel of Luke and the book of Acts has been considered to be the first Christian historian. The consensus among scholars is that Luke uses the methods of ancient historiographers to narrate a history with a number of sub-genres under discussion. Attitudes towards the historicity of Acts have ranged widely across scholarship in different countries. The first tentative beginnings of a specifically Christian historiography can be seen in Clement of Alexandria in the second century. The growth of Christianity and its enhanced status in the Roman Empire after Constantine I led to the development of a distinct Christian historiography, influenced by both Christian theology and the nature of the Christian Bible, encompassing new areas of study and views of history. The central role of the Bible in Christianity is reflected in the preference of Christian historians for written sources compared to the classical historians' preference for oral sources, and is also reflected in the inclusion of politically unimportant people. Christian historians also focused on development of religion and society. This can be seen in the extensive inclusion of written sources in the Ecclesiastical History of Eusebius of Caesarea around 324 and in the subjects it covers. Christian theology considered time as linear, progressing according to divine plan. As God's plan encompassed everyone, Christian histories in this period had a universal approach. For example, Christian writers often included summaries of important historical events prior to the period covered by the work.

Writing history was popular among Christian monks and clergy in the Middle Ages. They wrote about the history of Jesus Christ, that of the Church and that of their patrons, the dynastic history of the local rulers. In the Early Middle Ages historical writing often took the form of annals or chronicles recording events year by year, but this style tended to hamper the analysis of events and causes. An example of this type of writing is the Anglo-Saxon Chronicle, which was the work of several different writers: it was started during the reign of Alfred the Great in the late 9th century, but one copy was still being updated in 1154. Some writers in the period did construct a more narrative form of history. These included Gregory of Tours and more successfully Bede, who wrote both secular and ecclesiastical history and who is known for writing the Ecclesiastical History of the English People.

Outside of Europe and West Asia, Christian historiography also existed in Africa. For instance, Augustine of Hippo, the Berber theologian and bishop of Hippo Regius in Numidia (Roman North Africa), wrote a multiple volume autobiography called Confessions between 397 and 400 AD. While earlier pagan rulers of the Kingdom of Aksum produced autobiographical style epigraphic texts in locations spanning Ethiopia, Eritrea, and Sudan and in either Greek or the native Ge'ez script, the 4th century AD Ezana Stone commemorating Ezana of Axum's conquest of the Kingdom of Kush in Nubia also emphasized his conversion to Christianity (the first indigenous African head of state to do so). Aksumite manuscripts from the 5th to 7th centuries AD chronicling the dioceses and episcopal sees of the Coptic Orthodox Church demonstrate not only an adherence to Christian chronology but also influences from the non-Christian Kingdom of Kush, the Ptolemaic dynasty of Hellenistic Egypt, and the Yemenite Jews of the Himyarite Kingdom. The tradition of Ethiopian historiography evolved into a matured form during the Solomonic dynasty. Though works such as the 13th century Kebra Nagast blended Christian mythology with historical events in its narrative, the first proper biographical chronicle on an Emperor of Ethiopia was made for Amda Seyon I (r. 1314–1344), depicted as a Christian savior of his nation in conflicts with the Islamic Ifat Sultanate. The 16th century monk Bahrey was the first in Ethiopia to produce a historical ethnography, focusing on the migrating Oromo people who came into military conflict with the Ethiopian Empire. While royal biographies existed for individual Ethiopian emperors authored by court historians who were also clerical scholars within the Ethiopian Orthodox Church, the reigns of Iyasu II (r. 1730–1755) and Iyoas I (r. 1755–1769) were the first to be included in larger general dynastic histories.

During the Renaissance, history was written about states or nations. The study of history changed during the Enlightenment and Romanticism. Voltaire described the history of certain ages that he considered important, rather than describing events in chronological order. History became an independent discipline. It was not called philosophia historiae anymore, but merely history (historia).

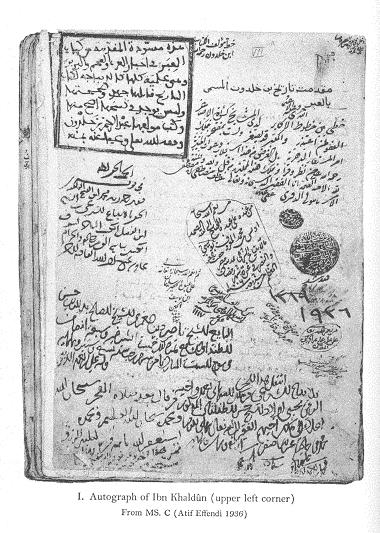
Autograph writing of Ibn Khaldun, pioneer of historiography, cultural history, and the philosophy of history

==== Islamic world ====
Muslim historical writings first began to develop in the 7th century, with the reconstruction of the Prophet Muhammad's life in the centuries following his death. With numerous conflicting narratives regarding Muhammad and his companions from various sources, it was necessary to verify which sources were more reliable. In order to evaluate these sources, various methodologies were developed, such as the "science of biography", "science of hadith" and "Isnad" (chain of transmission). These methodologies were later applied to other historical figures in the Islamic civilization. Famous historians in this tradition include Urwah (d. 712), Wahb ibn Munabbih (d. 728), Ibn Ishaq (d. 761), al-Waqidi (745–822), Ibn Hisham (d. 834), Muhammad al-Bukhari (810–870) and Ibn Hajar (1372–1449). Historians of the medieval Islamic world also developed an interest in world history. Islamic historical writing eventually culminated in the works of the Arab Muslim historian Ibn Khaldun (1332–1406), who published his historiographical studies in the Muqaddimah (translated as Prolegomena) and Kitab al-I'bar (Book of Advice). His work was forgotten until it was rediscovered in the late 19th century.

==== Jewish ====
Jewish historiography built on biblical and medieval historiography with significant periods in the 16th and 19th centuries, building on works such as the chains of tradition of the oral law, Christian and Hellenistic historiography, and the Josippon.

=== East Asia ===
==== Japan ====
The earliest works of history produced in Japan were the Rikkokushi (Six National Histories), a corpus of six national histories covering the history of Japan from its mythological beginnings until the 9th century. The first of these works were the Nihon Shoki, compiled by Prince Toneri in 720.

==== Korea ====
The tradition of Korean historiography was established with the Samguk sagi, a history of Korea from its allegedly earliest times. It was compiled by Goryeo court historian Kim Pusik after its commission by King Injong of Goryeo (r. 1122–1146). It was completed in 1145 and relied not only on earlier Chinese histories for source material, but also on the Hwarang Segi written by the Silla historian Kim Taemun in the 8th century. The latter work is now lost.

==== China ====
The Shitong, published around 710 by the Tang Chinese historian Liu Zhiji (661–721), was the first work to provide an outline of the entire tradition of Chinese historiography up to that point, and the first comprehensive work on historical criticism, arguing that historians should be skeptical of primary sources, rely on systematically gathered evidence, and should not treat previous scholars with undue deference. In 1084 the Song dynasty official Sima Guang completed the Zizhi Tongjian (Comprehensive Mirror to Aid in Government), which laid out the entire history of China from the beginning of the Warring States period (403 BC) to the end of the Five Dynasties period (959) in chronological annals form, rather than in the traditional annals-biography form. This work is considered much more accessible than the "Official Histories" for the Six dynasties, Tang dynasty, and Five Dynasties, and in practice superseded those works in the mind of the general reader.

The great Song Neo-Confucian Zhu Xi found the Mirror to be overly long for the average reader, as well as too morally nihilist, and therefore prepared a didactic summary of it called the Zizhi Tongjian Gangmu (Digest of the Comprehensive Mirror to Aid in Government), posthumously published in 1219. It reduced the original's 249 chapters to just 59, and for the rest of imperial Chinese history would be the first history book most people ever read.

=== South East Asia ===
==== Philippines ====
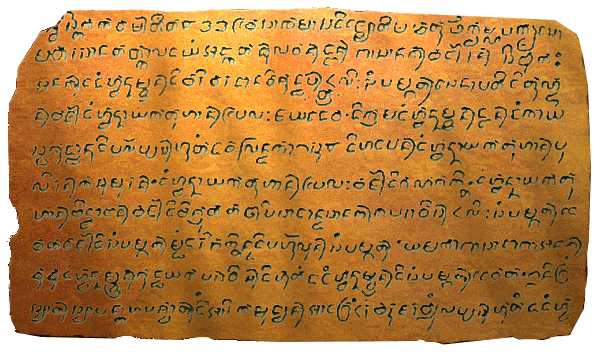
Laguna copperplate inscription

Historiography of the Philippines refers to the studies, sources, critical methods and interpretations used by scholars to study the history of the Philippines. It includes historical and archival research and writing on the history of the Philippine archipelago including the islands of Luzon, Visayas, and Mindanao. The Philippine archipelago was part of many empires before the Spanish Empire arrived in the 16th century.

Southeast Asia is classified as part of the Indosphere and the Sinosphere. The archipelago had direct contact with China during the Song dynasty (960–1279), and was a part of the Srivijaya and Majapahit empires. The pre-colonial Philippines widely used the abugida system in writing and seals on documents, though it was for communication and no recorded writings of early literature or history. Ancient Filipinos usually wrote documents on bamboo, bark, and leaves, which did not survive, unlike inscriptions on clay, metal, and ivory, such as the Laguna Copperplate Inscription and Butuan Ivory Seal. The discovery of the Butuan Ivory Seal also proves the use of paper documents in ancient Philippines.

After the Spanish conquest, pre-colonial Filipino manuscripts and documents were gathered and burned to eliminate pagan beliefs. This has been the burden of historians in the accumulation of data and the development of theories that gave historians many aspects of Philippine history that were left unexplained. The interplay of pre-colonial events and the use of secondary sources written by historians to evaluate the primary sources, do not provide a critical examination of the methodology of the early Philippine historical study.

=== Enlightenment ===
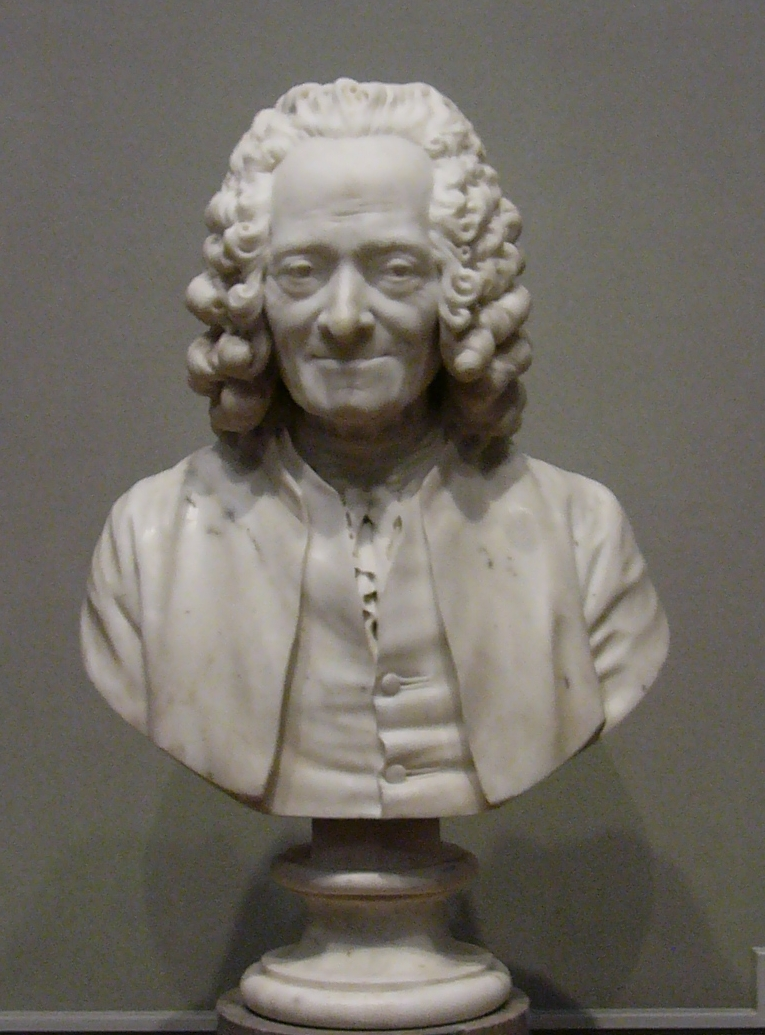
Voltaire's works of history are an excellent example of Enlightenment era advances in accuracy.

During the Age of Enlightenment, the modern development of historiography through the application of scrupulous methods began. Among the many Italians who contributed to this were Leonardo Bruni (c. 1370–1444), Francesco Guicciardini (1483–1540), and Cesare Baronio (1538–1607).

==== Voltaire ====
French philosophe Voltaire (1694–1778) had an enormous influence on the development of historiography during the Age of Enlightenment through his demonstration of fresh new ways to look at the past. Guillaume de Syon argues:

Voltaire recast historiography in both factual and analytical terms. Not only did he reject traditional biographies and accounts that claim the work of supernatural forces, but he went so far as to suggest that earlier historiography was rife with falsified evidence and required new investigations at the source. Such an outlook was not unique in that the scientific spirit that 18th-century intellectuals perceived themselves as invested with. A rationalistic approach was key to rewriting history.

Voltaire's best-known histories are The Age of Louis XIV (1751), and his Essay on the Customs and the Spirit of the Nations (1756). He broke from the tradition of narrating diplomatic and military events, and emphasized customs, social history and achievements in the arts and sciences. He was the first scholar to make a serious attempt to write the history of the world, eliminating theological frameworks, and emphasizing economics, culture and political history. Although he repeatedly warned against political bias on the part of the historian, he did not miss many opportunities to expose the intolerance and frauds of the church over the ages. Voltaire advised scholars that anything contradicting the normal course of nature was not to be believed. Although he found evil in the historical record, he fervently believed reason and educating the illiterate masses would lead to progress. Voltaire's History of Charles XII (1731) about the Swedish warrior king (Swedish: Karl XII) is also one of his most famous works. It is not least known as one of Napoleon's absolute favorite books.

Voltaire explains his view of historiography in his article on "History" in Diderot's Encyclopédie: "One demands of modern historians more details, better ascertained facts, precise dates, more attention to customs, laws, mores, commerce, finance, agriculture, population." Already in 1739 he had written: "My chief object is not political or military history, it is the history of the arts, of commerce, of civilization—in a word—of the human mind." Voltaire's histories used the values of the Enlightenment to evaluate the past. He helped free historiography from antiquarianism, Eurocentrism, religious intolerance and a concentration on great men, diplomacy, and warfare. Peter Gay says Voltaire wrote "very good history", citing his "scrupulous concern for truths", "careful sifting of evidence", "intelligent selection of what is important", "keen sense of drama", and "grasp of the fact that a whole civilization is a unit of study".

==== David Hume ====
At the same time, philosopher David Hume was having a similar effect on the study of history in Great Britain. In 1754 he published The History of England, a 6-volume work which extended "From the Invasion of Julius Caesar to the Revolution in 1688". Hume adopted a similar scope to Voltaire in his history; as well as the history of Kings, Parliaments, and armies, he examined the history of culture, including literature and science, as well. His short biographies of leading scientists explored the process of scientific change and he developed new ways of seeing scientists in the context of their times by looking at how they interacted with society and each other—he paid special attention to Francis Bacon, Robert Boyle, Isaac Newton and William Harvey.

He also argued that the quest for liberty was the highest standard for judging the past, and concluded that after considerable fluctuation, England at the time of his writing had achieved "the most entire system of liberty, that was ever known amongst mankind".

==== Edward Gibbon ====
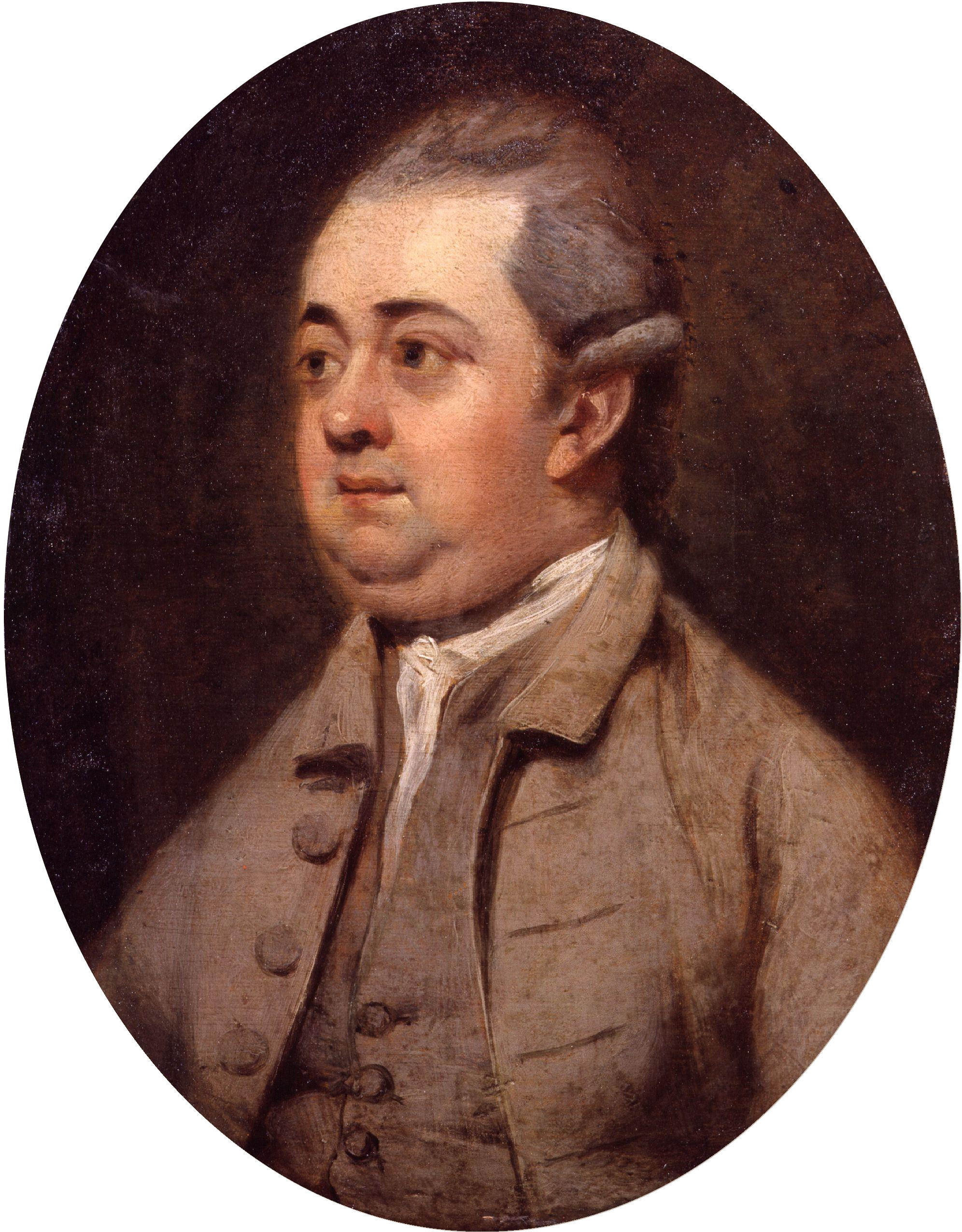
Edward Gibbon's The History of the Decline and Fall of the Roman Empire (1776) was a masterpiece of late 18th-century history writing.

The apex of Enlightenment history was reached with Edward Gibbon's monumental six-volume work, The History of the Decline and Fall of the Roman Empire, published on 17 February 1776. Because of its relative objectivity and heavy use of primary sources, its methodology became a model for later historians. This has led to Gibbon being called the first "modern historian". The book sold impressively, earning its author a total of about £9000. Biographer Leslie Stephen wrote that thereafter, "His fame was as rapid as it has been lasting."

Gibbon's work has been praised for its style, its piquant epigrams and its effective irony. Winston Churchill memorably noted, "I set out upon ... Gibbon's Decline and Fall of the Roman Empire [and] was immediately dominated both by the story and the style. ... I devoured Gibbon. I rode triumphantly through it from end to end and enjoyed it all." Gibbon was pivotal in the secularizing and 'desanctifying' of history, remarking, for example, on the "want of truth and common sense" of biographies composed by Saint Jerome. Unusually for an 18th-century historian, Gibbon was never content with secondhand accounts when the primary sources were accessible (though most of these were drawn from well-known printed editions). He said, "I have always endeavoured to draw from the fountain-head; that my curiosity, as well as a sense of duty, has always urged me to study the originals; and that, if they have sometimes eluded my search, I have carefully marked the secondary evidence, on whose faith a passage or a fact were reduced to depend." In this insistence upon the importance of primary sources, Gibbon broke new ground in the methodical study of history:

In accuracy, thoroughness, lucidity, and comprehensive grasp of a vast subject, the 'History' is unsurpassable. It is the one English history which may be regarded as definitive. ... Whatever its shortcomings the book is artistically imposing as well as historically unimpeachable as a vast panorama of a great period.

=== 19th century ===
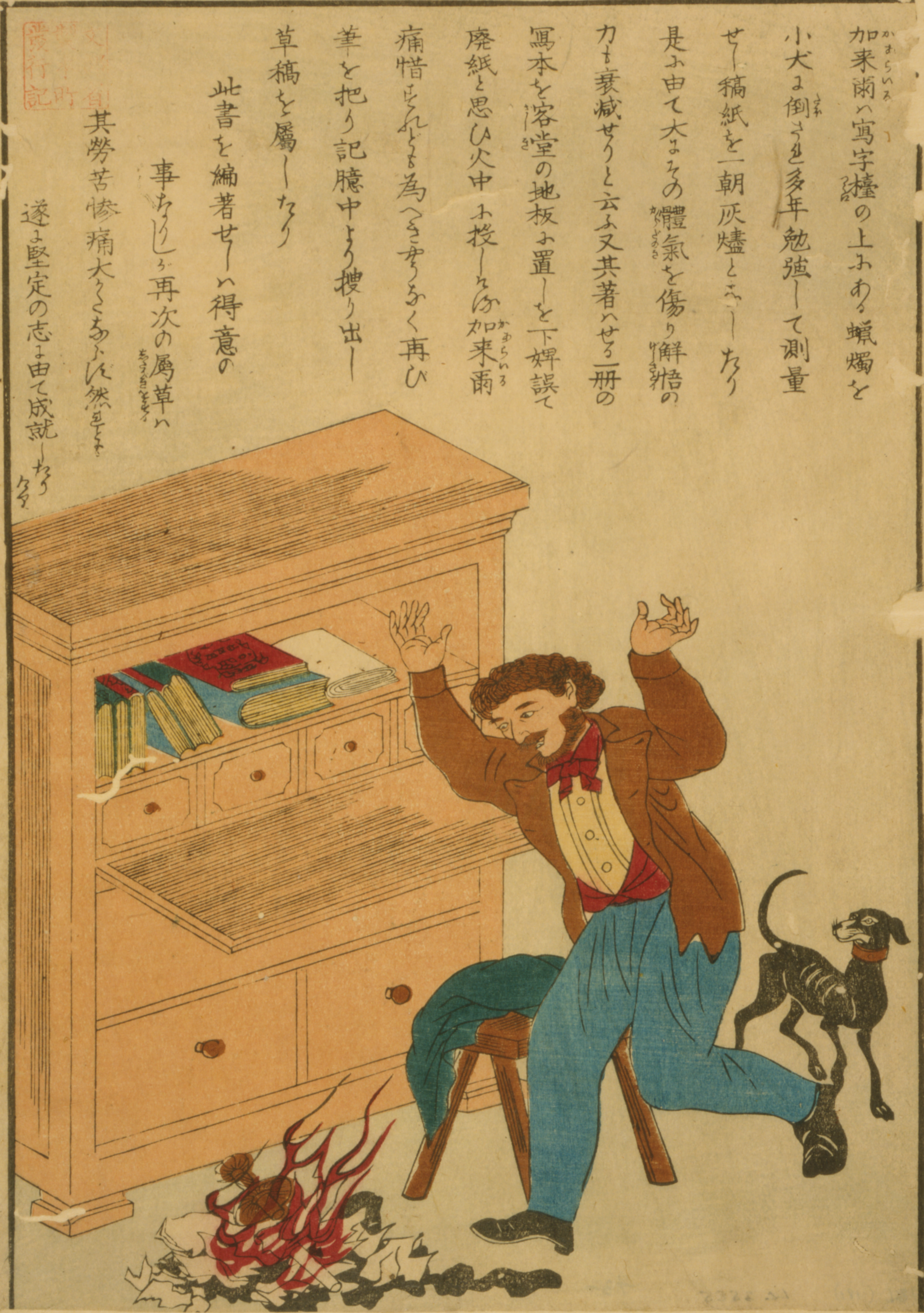
Japanese print depicting Thomas Carlyle's horror at the burning of his manuscript The French Revolution: A History

The tumultuous events surrounding the French Revolution inspired much of the historiography and analysis of the early 19th century. Interest in the 1688 Glorious Revolution was also rekindled by the Reform Act of 1832 in England. Nineteenth century historiography, especially among American historians, featured conflicting viewpoints that represented the times. According to 20th-century historian Richard Hofstadter:

The historians of the nineteenth century worked under the pressure of two internal tensions: on one side there was the constant demand of society—whether through the nationstate, the church, or some special group or class interest—for memory mixed with myth, for the historical tale that would strengthen group loyalties or confirm national pride; and against this there were the demands of critical method, and even, after a time, the goal of writing "scientific" history.

==== Thomas Carlyle ====
Thomas Carlyle published his three-volume The French Revolution: A History, in 1837. The first volume was accidentally burned by John Stuart Mill's maid. Carlyle rewrote it from scratch. Carlyle's style of historical writing stressed the immediacy of action, often using the present tense. He emphasised the role of forces of the spirit in history and thought that chaotic events demanded what he called 'heroes' to take control over the competing forces erupting within society. He considered the dynamic forces of history as being the hopes and aspirations of people that took the form of ideas, and were often ossified into ideologies. Carlyle's The French Revolution was written in a highly unorthodox style, far removed from the neutral and detached tone of the tradition of Gibbon. Carlyle presented the history as dramatic events unfolding in the present as though he and the reader were participants on the streets of Paris at the famous events. Carlyle's invented style was epic poetry combined with philosophical treatise. It is rarely read or cited in the last century.

==== French historians: Michelet and Taine ====
Jules Michelet (1798–1874), later in his career

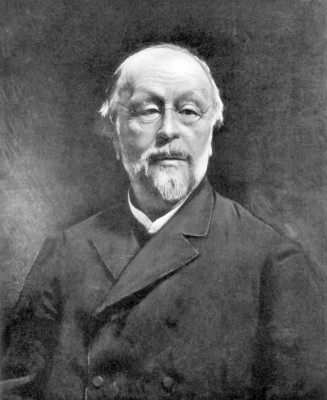
Hippolyte Taine (1828–1893)

In his main work Histoire de France (1855), French historian Jules Michelet (1798–1874) coined the term Renaissance (meaning "rebirth" in French), as a period in Europe's cultural history that represented a break from the Middle Ages, creating a modern understanding of humanity and its place in the world. The 19-volume work covered French history from Charlemagne to the outbreak of the French Revolution. His inquiry into manuscript and printed authorities was most laborious, but his lively imagination, and his strong religious and political prejudices, made him regard all things from a singularly personal point of view.

Michelet was one of the first historians to shift the emphasis of history to the common people, rather than the leaders and institutions of the country. He had a decisive impact on scholars. Gayana Jurkevich argues that, led by Michelet,

19th-century French historians no longer saw history as the chronicling of royal dynasties, armies, treaties, and great men of state, but as the history of ordinary French people and the landscape of France.

Hippolyte Taine (1828–1893), although unable to secure an academic position, was the chief theoretical influence of French naturalism, a major proponent of sociological positivism, and one of the first practitioners of historicist criticism. He pioneered the idea of "the milieu" as an active historical force which amalgamated geographical, psychological, and social factors. Historical writing for him was a search for general laws. His brilliant style kept his writing in circulation long after his theoretical approaches were passé.

==== Cultural and constitutional history ====
One of the major progenitors of the history of culture and art, was the Swiss historian Jacob Burckhardt. Siegfried Giedion described Burckhardt's achievement in the following terms: "The great discoverer of the age of the Renaissance, he first showed how a period should be treated in its entirety, with regard not only for its painting, sculpture and architecture, but for the social institutions of its daily life as well."

His most famous work was The Civilization of the Renaissance in Italy, published in 1860; it was the most influential interpretation of the Italian Renaissance in the nineteenth century and is still widely read. According to John Lukacs, he was the first master of cultural history, which seeks to describe the spirit and the forms of expression of a particular age, a particular people, or a particular place. His innovative approach to historical research stressed the importance of art and its inestimable value as a primary source for the study of history. He was one of the first historians to rise above the narrow nineteenth-century notion that "history is past politics and politics current history."

By the mid-19th century, scholars were beginning to analyse the history of institutional change, particularly the development of constitutional government. William Stubbs's Constitutional History of England (3 vols., 1874–1878) was an important influence on this developing field. The work traced the development of the English constitution from the Teutonic invasions of Britain until 1485, and marked a distinct step in the advance of English historical learning. He argued that the theory of the unity and continuity of history should not remove distinctions between ancient and modern history. He believed that, though work on ancient history is a useful preparation for the study of modern history, either may advantageously be studied apart. He was a good palaeographer, and excelled in textual criticism, in examination of authorship, and other such matters, while his vast erudition and retentive memory made him second to none in interpretation and exposition.

==== Von Ranke and professionalization in Germany ====
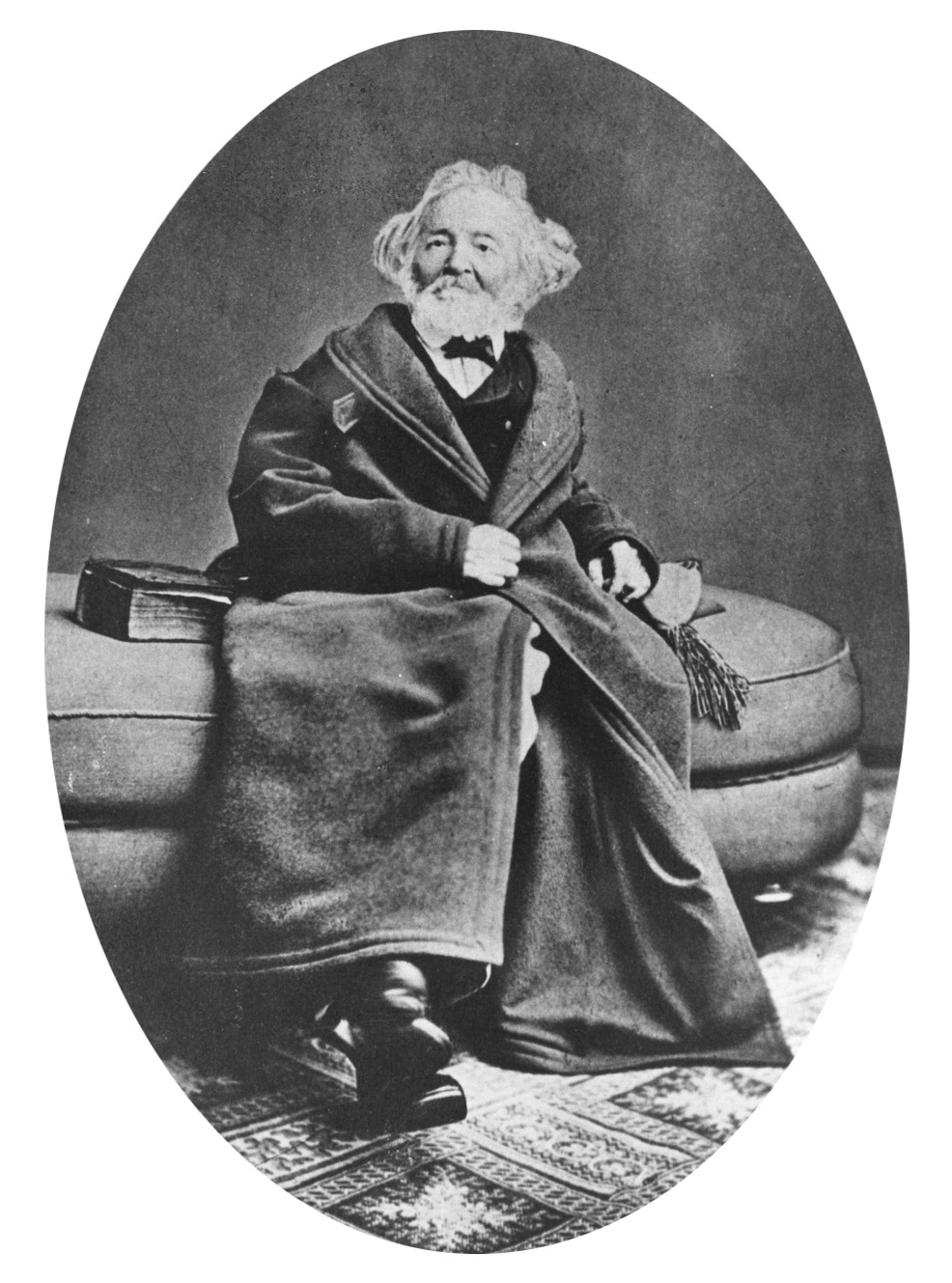
Ranke established history as a professional academic discipline in Germany.

The modern academic study of history and methods of historiography were pioneered in 19th-century German universities, especially the University of Göttingen. Leopold von Ranke (1795–1886) at Berlin was a pivotal influence in this regard, and was the founder of modern source-based history. According to Caroline Hoefferle, "Ranke was probably the most important historian to shape historical profession as it emerged in Europe and the United States in the late 19th century."

Specifically, he implemented the seminar teaching method in his classroom, and focused on archival research and analysis of historical documents. Beginning with his first book in 1824, the History of the Latin and Teutonic Peoples from 1494 to 1514, Ranke used an unusually wide variety of sources for a historian of the age, including "memoirs, diaries, personal and formal missives, government documents, diplomatic dispatches and first-hand accounts of eye-witnesses". Over a career that spanned much of the century, Ranke set the standards for much of later historical writing, introducing such ideas as reliance on primary sources, an emphasis on narrative history and especially international politics (Aussenpolitik). Sources had to be solid, not speculations and rationalizations. His credo was to write history the way it was. He insisted on primary sources with proven authenticity.

Ranke also rejected the 'teleological approach' to history, which traditionally viewed each period as inferior to the period which follows. In Ranke's view, the historian had to understand a period on its own terms, and seek to find only the general ideas which animated every period of history. In 1831 and at the behest of the Prussian government, Ranke founded and edited the first historical journal in the world, called Historisch-Politische Zeitschrift.

Another important German thinker was Georg Wilhelm Friedrich Hegel, whose theory of historical progress ran counter to Ranke's approach. In Hegel's own words, his philosophical theory of "World history ... represents the development of the spirit's consciousness of its own freedom and of the consequent realization of this freedom." This realization is seen by studying the various cultures that have developed over the millennia, and trying to understand the way that freedom has worked itself out through them:

World history is the record of the spirit's efforts to attain knowledge of what it is in itself. The Orientals do not know that the spirit or man as such are free in themselves. And because they do not know that, they are not themselves free. They only know that One is free. ... The consciousness of freedom first awoke among the Greeks, and they were accordingly free; but, like the Romans, they only knew that Some, and not all men as such, are free. ... The Germanic nations, with the rise of Christianity, were the first to realize that All men are by nature free, and that freedom of spirit is his very essence.

Karl Marx introduced the concept of historical materialism into the study of world historical development. In his conception, the economic conditions and dominant modes of production determined the structure of society at that point. In his view five successive stages in the development of material conditions would occur in Western Europe. The first stage was primitive communism where property was shared and there was no concept of "leadership". This progressed to a slave society where the idea of class emerged and the State developed. Feudalism was characterized by an aristocracy working in partnership with a theocracy and the emergence of the nation-state. Capitalism appeared after the bourgeois revolution when the capitalists (or their merchant predecessors) overthrew the feudal system and established a market economy, with private property and parliamentary democracy. Marx then predicted the eventual proletarian revolution that would result in the attainment of socialism, followed by communism, where property would be communally owned.

Previous historians had focused on cyclical events of the rise and decline of rulers and nations. Process of nationalization of history, as part of national revivals in the 19th century, resulted with separation of "one's own" history from common universal history by such way of perceiving, understanding and treating the past that constructed history as history of a nation. A new discipline, sociology, emerged in the late 19th century and analyzed and compared these perspectives on a larger scale.

==== Macaulay and Whig history ====
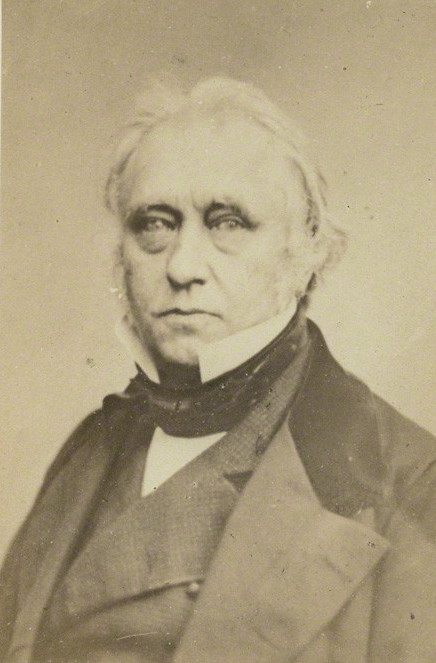
Macaulay was the most influential exponent of the Whig history.

The term "Whig history", coined by Herbert Butterfield in his short book The Whig Interpretation of History in 1931, means the approach to historiography which presents the past as an inevitable progression towards ever greater liberty and enlightenment, culminating in modern forms of liberal democracy and constitutional monarchy. In general, Whig historians emphasized the rise of constitutional government, personal freedoms and scientific progress. The term has been also applied widely in historical disciplines outside of British history (the history of science, for example) to criticize any teleological (or goal-directed), hero-based, and transhistorical narrative.

Paul Rapin de Thoyras's history of England, published in 1723, became "the classic Whig history" for the first half of the 18th century. It was later supplanted by the immensely popular The History of England by David Hume. Whig historians emphasized the achievements of the Glorious Revolution of 1688. This included James Mackintosh's History of the Revolution in England in 1688, William Blackstone's Commentaries on the Laws of England, and Henry Hallam's Constitutional History of England.

The most famous exponent of 'Whiggery' was Thomas Babington Macaulay. His writings are famous for their ringing prose and for their confident, sometimes dogmatic, emphasis on a progressive model of British history, according to which the country threw off superstition, autocracy and confusion to create a balanced constitution and a forward-looking culture combined with freedom of belief and expression. This model of human progress has been called the Whig interpretation of history. He published the first volumes of his most famous work of history, The History of England from the Accession of James II, in 1848. It proved an immediate success and replaced Hume's history to become the new orthodoxy. His 'Whiggish convictions' are spelled out in his first chapter:

I shall relate how the new settlement was ... successfully defended against foreign and domestic enemies; how ... the authority of law and the security of property were found to be compatible with a liberty of discussion and of individual action never before known; how, from the auspicious union of order and freedom, sprang a prosperity of which the annals of human affairs had furnished no example; how our country, from a state of ignominious vassalage, rapidly rose to the place of umpire among European powers; how her opulence and her martial glory grew together; ... how a gigantic commerce gave birth to a maritime power, compared with which every other maritime power, ancient or modern, sinks into insignificance ... the history of our country during the last hundred and sixty years is eminently the history of physical, of moral, and of intellectual improvement.

His legacy continues to be controversial; Gertrude Himmelfarb wrote that "most professional historians have long since given up reading Macaulay, as they have given up writing the kind of history he wrote and thinking about history as he did." However, J. R. Western wrote that: "Despite its age and blemishes, Macaulay's History of England has still to be superseded by a full-scale modern history of the period".

The Whig consensus was steadily undermined during the post-World War I re-evaluation of European history, and Butterfield's critique exemplified this trend. Intellectuals no longer believed the world was automatically getting better and better. Subsequent generations of academic historians have similarly rejected Whig history because of its presentist and teleological assumption that history is driving toward some sort of goal. Other criticized 'Whig' assumptions included viewing the British system as the apex of human political development, assuming that political figures in the past held current political beliefs (anachronism), considering British history as a march of progress with inevitable outcomes and presenting political figures of the past as heroes, who advanced the cause of this political progress, or villains, who sought to hinder its inevitable triumph. J. Hart says "a Whig interpretation requires human heroes and villains in the story."

=== 20th century ===
20th-century historiography in major countries is characterized by a move to universities and academic research centers. Popular history continued to be written by self-educated amateurs, but scholarly history increasingly became the province of PhD's trained in research seminars at a university. The training emphasized working with primary sources in archives. Seminars taught graduate students how to review the historiography of the topics, so that they could understand the conceptual frameworks currently in use, and the criticisms regarding their strengths and weaknesses. Western Europe and the United States took leading roles in this development. The emergence of area studies of other regions also developed historiographical practices.

==== France: Annales school ====
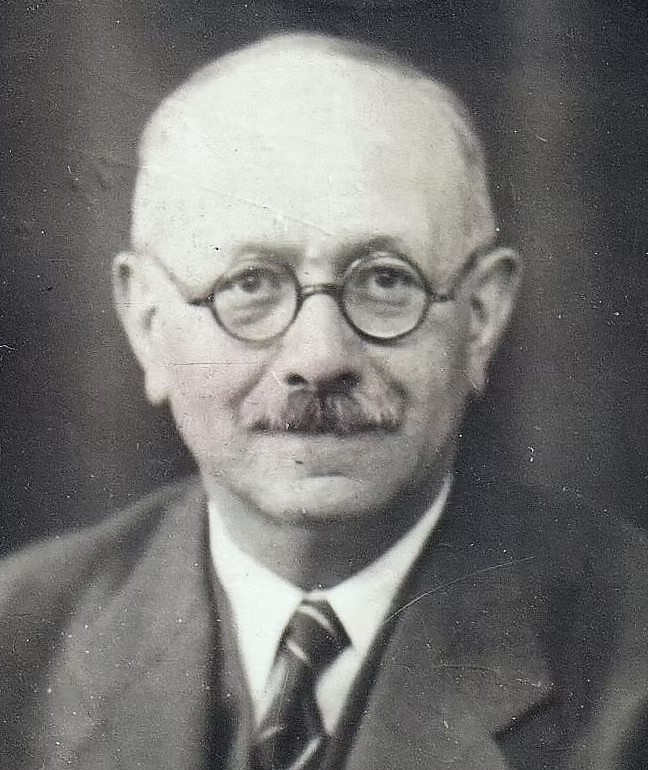
The 20th century saw the creation of a huge variety of historiographical approaches; one was Marc Bloch's focus on social history rather than traditional political history.

The French Annales school radically changed the focus of historical research in France during the 20th century by stressing long-term social history, rather than political or diplomatic themes. The school emphasized the use of quantification and the paying of special attention to geography.

The Annales d'histoire économique et sociale journal was founded in 1929 in Strasbourg by Marc Bloch and Lucien Febvre. These authors, the former a medieval historian and the latter an early modernist, quickly became associated with the distinctive Annales approach, which combined geography, history, and the sociological approaches of the Année Sociologique (many members of which were their colleagues at Strasbourg) to produce an approach which rejected the predominant emphasis on politics, diplomacy and war of many 19th and early 20th-century historians as spearheaded by historians whom Febvre called Les Sorbonnistes. Instead, they pioneered an approach to a study of long-term historical structures (la longue durée) over events and political transformations. Geography, material culture, and what later Annalistes called mentalités, or the psychology of the epoch, are also characteristic areas of study. The goal of the Annales was to undo the work of the Sorbonnistes, to turn French historians away from the narrowly political and diplomatic toward the new vistas in social and economic history. For early modern Mexican history, the work of Marc Bloch's student François Chevalier on the formation of landed estates (haciendas) from the sixteenth century to the seventeenth had a major impact on Mexican history and historiography, setting off an important debate about whether landed estates were basically feudal or capitalistic.

An eminent member of this school, Georges Duby, described his approach to history as one that

relegated the sensational to the sidelines and was reluctant to give a simple accounting of events, but strived on the contrary to pose and solve problems and, neglecting surface disturbances, to observe the long and medium-term evolution of economy, society and civilisation.

The Annalistes, especially Lucien Febvre, advocated a histoire totale, or histoire tout court, a complete study of a historical problem.

The second era of the school was led by Fernand Braudel and was very influential throughout the 1960s and 1970s, especially for his work on the Mediterranean region in the era of Philip II of Spain. Braudel developed the idea, often associated with Annalistes, of different modes of historical time: l'histoire quasi immobile (motionless history) of historical geography, the history of social, political and economic structures (la longue durée), and the history of men and events, in the context of their structures. His 'longue durée' approach stressed slow, and often imperceptible effects of space, climate and technology on the actions of human beings in the past. The Annales historians, after living through two world wars and major political upheavals in France, were deeply uncomfortable with the notion that multiple ruptures and discontinuities created history. They preferred to stress slow change and the longue durée. They paid special attention to geography, climate, and demography as long-term factors. They considered the continuities of the deepest structures were central to history, beside which upheavals in institutions or the superstructure of social life were of little significance, for history lies beyond the reach of conscious actors, especially the will of revolutionaries.

Noting the political upheavals in Europe and especially in France in 1968, Eric Hobsbawm argued that "in France the virtual hegemony of Braudelian history and the Annales came to an end after 1968, and the international influence of the journal dropped steeply." Multiple responses were attempted by the school. Scholars moved in multiple directions, covering in disconnected fashion the social, economic, and cultural history of different eras and different parts of the globe. By the time of crisis the school was building a vast publishing and research network reaching across France, Europe, and the rest of the world. Influence indeed spread out from Paris, but few new ideas came in. Much emphasis was given to quantitative data, seen as the key to unlocking all of social history. However, the Annales ignored the developments in quantitative studies underway in the U.S. and Britain, which reshaped economic, political and demographic research.

==== Marxist historiography ====
Marxist historiography developed as a school of historiography influenced by the chief tenets of Marxism, including the centrality of social class and economic constraints in determining historical outcomes (historical materialism). Friedrich Engels wrote The Peasant War in Germany, which analysed social warfare in early Protestant Germany in terms of emerging capitalist classes. Although it lacked a rigorous engagement with archival sources, it indicated an early interest in history from below and class analysis, and it attempts a dialectical analysis. Another treatise of Engels, The Condition of the Working Class in England in 1844, was salient in creating the socialist impetus in British politics from then on, e.g. the Fabian Society.

R. H. Tawney was an early historian working in this tradition. The Agrarian Problem in the Sixteenth Century (1912) and Religion and the Rise of Capitalism (1926), reflected his ethical concerns and preoccupations in economic history. He was profoundly interested in the issue of the enclosure of land in the English countryside in the sixteenth and seventeenth centuries and in Max Weber's thesis on the connection between the appearance of Protestantism and the rise of capitalism. His belief in the rise of the gentry in the century before the outbreak of the Civil War in England provoked the 'Storm over the Gentry' in which his methods were subjected to severe criticisms by Hugh Trevor-Roper and John Cooper.

Historiography in the Soviet Union was greatly influenced by Marxist historiography, as historical materialism was extended into the Soviet version of dialectical materialism.

A circle of historians inside the Communist Party of Great Britain (CPGB) formed in 1946 and became a highly influential cluster of British Marxist historians, who contributed to history from below and class structure in early capitalist society. While some members of the group (most notably Christopher Hill and E. P. Thompson) left the CPGB after the 1956 Hungarian Revolution, the common points of British Marxist historiography continued in their works. They placed a great emphasis on the subjective determination of history.

Christopher Hill's studies on 17th-century English history were widely acknowledged and recognised as representative of this school. His books include Puritanism and Revolution (1958), Intellectual Origins of the English Revolution (1965 and revised in 1996), The Century of Revolution (1961), AntiChrist in 17th-century England (1971), The World Turned Upside Down (1972) and many others. E. P. Thompson pioneered the study of history from below in his work, The Making of the English Working Class, published in 1963. It focused on the forgotten history of the first working-class political left in the world in the late-18th and early-19th centuries. In his preface to this book, Thompson set out his approach to writing history from below:

I am seeking to rescue the poor stockinger, the Luddite cropper, the "obsolete" hand-loom weaver, the "Utopian" artisan, and even the deluded follower of Joanna Southcott, from the enormous condescension of posterity. Their crafts and traditions may have been dying. Their hostility to the new industrialism may have been backward-looking. Their communitarian ideals may have been fantasies. Their insurrectionary conspiracies may have been foolhardy. But they lived through these times of acute social disturbance, and we did not. Their aspirations were valid in terms of their own experience; and, if they were casualties of history, they remain, condemned in their own lives, as casualties.

Thompson's work was also significant because of the way he defined "class". He argued that class was not a structure, but a relationship that changed over time. He opened the gates for a generation of labor historians, such as David Montgomery and Herbert Gutman, who made similar studies of the American working classes.

Other important Marxist historians included Eric Hobsbawm, C. L. R. James, Raphael Samuel, A. L. Morton and Brian Pearce.

==== Biography ====
Biography has been a major form of historiography since the days when Plutarch wrote the parallel lives of great Roman and Greek leaders. It is a field especially attractive to nonacademic historians, and often to the spouses or children of famous people, who have access to the trove of letters and documents. Academic historians tend to downplay biography because it pays too little attention to broad social, cultural, political and economic forces, and perhaps too much attention to popular psychology. The "Great Man" tradition in Britain originated in the multi-volume Dictionary of National Biography (which originated in 1882 and issued updates into the 1970s); it continues to this day in the new Oxford Dictionary of National Biography. In the United States, the Dictionary of American Biography was planned in the late 1920s and appeared with numerous supplements into the 1980s. It has now been displaced by the American National Biography as well as numerous smaller historical encyclopedias that give thorough coverage to Great Persons. Bookstores do a thriving business in biographies, which sell far more copies than the esoteric monographs based on post-structuralism, cultural, racial or gender history. Michael Holroyd says the last forty years "may be seen as a golden age of biography", but nevertheless calls it the "shallow end of history". Nicolas Barker argues that "more and more biographies command an ever larger readership", as he speculates that biography has come "to express the spirit of our age".

Daniel R. Meister argues that:

Biography Studies is emerging as an independent discipline, especially in the Netherlands. This Dutch School of biography is moving biography studies away from the less scholarly life writing tradition and towards history by encouraging its practitioners to utilize an approach adapted from microhistory.

==== British debates ====
Marxist historian E. H. Carr developed a controversial theory of history in his 1961 book What Is History?, which proved to be one of the most influential books ever written on the subject. He presented a middle-of-the-road position between the empirical or (Rankean) view of history and R. G. Collingwood's idealism, and rejected the empirical view of the historian's work being an accretion of "facts" that they have at their disposal as nonsense. He maintained that there is such a vast quantity of information that the historian always chooses the "facts" they decide to make use of. In Carr's famous example, he claimed that millions had crossed the Rubicon, but only Julius Caesar's crossing in 49 BC is declared noteworthy by historians. For this reason, Carr argued that Leopold von Ranke's famous dictum wie es eigentlich gewesen (show what actually happened) was wrong because it presumed that the "facts" influenced what the historian wrote, rather than the historian choosing what "facts of the past" they intended to turn into "historical facts". At the same time, Carr argued that the study of the facts may lead the historian to change his or her views. In this way, Carr argued that history was "an unending dialogue between the past and present".

Carr is held by some critics to have had a deterministic outlook in history. Others have modified or rejected this use of the label "determinist". He took a hostile view of those historians who stress the workings of chance and contingency in the workings of history. In Carr's view, no individual is truly free of the social environment in which they live, but contended that within those limitations, there was room, albeit very narrow room for people to make decisions that affect history. Carr emphatically contended that history was a social science, not an art, because historians like scientists seek generalizations that helped to broaden the understanding of one's subject.

One of Carr's most forthright critics was Hugh Trevor-Roper, who argued that Carr's dismissal of the "might-have-beens of history" reflected a fundamental lack of interest in examining historical causation. Trevor-Roper asserted that examining possible alternative outcomes of history was far from being a "parlour-game" was rather an essential part of the historians' work, as only by considering all possible outcomes of a given situation could a historian properly understand the period.

The controversy inspired Sir Geoffrey Elton to write his 1967 book The Practice of History. Elton criticized Carr for his "whimsical" distinction between the "historical facts" and the "facts of the past", arguing that it reflected "...an extraordinarily arrogant attitude both to the past and to the place of the historian studying it". Elton, instead, strongly defended the traditional methods of history and was also appalled by the inroads made by postmodernism. Elton saw the duty of historians as empirically gathering evidence and objectively analyzing what the evidence has to say. As a traditionalist, he placed great emphasis on the role of individuals in history instead of abstract, impersonal forces. Elton saw political history as the highest kind of history. Elton had no use for those who seek history to make myths, to create laws to explain the past, or to produce theories such as Marxism.

==== U.S. approaches ====
Classical and European history was part of the 19th-century grammar curriculum. American history became a topic later in the 19th century. In the historiography of the United States, there were a series of major approaches in the 20th century. In 2009–2012, there were an average of 16,000 new academic history books published in the U.S. every year.

===== Progressive historians =====
The Progressive historians were a group of 20th-century historians of the United States associated with a historiographical tradition that embraced an economic interpretation of American history. Most prominent among these was Charles A. Beard, who was influential in academe and with the general public.

===== Consensus history =====
Consensus history emphasizes the basic unity of American values and downplays conflict as superficial. It was especially attractive in the 1950s and 1960s. Prominent leaders included Richard Hofstadter, Louis Hartz, Daniel Boorstin, Allan Nevins, Clinton Rossiter, Edmund Morgan, and David M. Potter. In 1948 Hofstadter made a compelling statement of the consensus model of the U.S. political tradition:

The fierceness of the political struggles has often been misleading: for the range of vision embraced by the primary contestants in the major parties has always been bounded by the horizons of property and enterprise. However much at odds on specific issues, the major political traditions have shared a belief in the rights of property, the philosophy of economic individualism, the value of competition; they have accepted the economic virtues of capitalist culture as necessary qualities of man.

===== New Left history =====
Consensus history was rejected by New Left viewpoints that attracted a younger generation of radical historians in the 1960s. These viewpoints stress conflict and emphasize the central roles of class, race and gender. The history of dissent, and the experiences of racial minorities and disadvantaged classes was central to the narratives produced by New Left historians.

===== Quantification and new approaches to history =====
Social history, sometimes called the "new social history", is a broad branch that studies the experiences of ordinary people in the past. It had major growth as a field in the 1960s and 1970s, and still is well represented in history departments. However, after 1980 the "cultural turn" directed the next generation to new topics. In the two decades from 1975 to 1995, the proportion of professors of history in U.S. universities identifying with social history rose from 31 to 41 percent, while the proportion of political historians fell from 40 to 30 percent.

The growth was enabled by the social sciences, computers, statistics, new data sources such as individual census information, and summer training programs at the Newberry Library and the University of Michigan. The New Political History saw the application of social history methods to politics, as the focus shifted from politicians and legislation to voters and elections. The Social Science History Association was formed in 1976 as an interdisciplinary group with a journal Social Science History and an annual convention. The goal was to incorporate in historical studies perspectives from all the social sciences, especially political science, sociology and economics. The pioneers shared a commitment to quantification. However, by the 1980s the first blush of quantification had worn off, as traditional historians counterattacked. Harvey J. Graff says:

The case against the new mixed and confused a lengthy list of ingredients, including the following: history's supposed loss of identity and humanity in the stain of social science, the fear of subordinating quality to quantity, conceptual and technical fallacies, violation of the literary character and biographical base of "good" history (rhetorical and aesthetic concern), loss of audiences, derogation of history rooted in "great men" and "great events", trivialization in general, a hodgepodge of ideological objections from all directions, and a fear that new historians were reaping research funds that might otherwise come to their detractors. To defenders of history as they knew it, the discipline was in crisis, and the pursuit of the new was a major cause.

Meanwhile, "new" economic history became well-established. However, cliometrics has never been considered a historical field by the vast majority of historians so that cliometric articles have not been cited by historians. Economists mostly employed economic theories and econometric applications similar to typical economic papers. As a result, quantification remained central to demographic studies, but slipped behind in political and social history as traditional narrative approaches made a comeback. Recently, as the newest approach in economic history "new history of capitalism" appeared. In the first article of the related journal, Marc Flandreau defined their purpose as "crossing border" to create a truly interdisciplinary field.

==== Latin America ====
Latin America is the former Spanish American empire in the Western Hemisphere plus Portuguese Brazil. Professional historians pioneered the creation of this field, starting in the late nineteenth century. The term "Latin America" did not come into general usage until the twentieth century and in some cases it was rejected. The historiography of the field has been more fragmented than unified, with historians of Spanish America and Brazil generally remaining in separate spheres. Another standard division within the historiography is the temporal factor, with works falling into either the early modern period (or "colonial era") or the post-independence (or "national") period, from the early nineteenth onward. Relatively few works span the two eras and few works except textbooks unite Spanish America and Brazil. There is a tendency to focus on histories of particular countries or regions (the Andes, the Southern Cone, the Caribbean) with relatively little comparative work.

Historians of Latin America have contributed to various types of historical writing, but one major, innovative development in Spanish American history is the emergence of ethnohistory, the history of indigenous peoples, especially in Mexico based on alphabetic sources in Spanish or in indigenous languages.

For the early modern period, the emergence of Atlantic history, based on comparisons and linkages of Europe, the Americas, and Africa from 1450 to 1850 that developed as a field in its own right has integrated early modern Latin American history into a larger framework. For all periods, global or world history have focused on the connections between areas, likewise integrating Latin America into a larger perspective. Latin America's importance to world history is notable but often overlooked. "Latin America's central, and sometimes pioneering, role in the development of globalization and modernity did not cease with the end of colonial rule and the early modern period. Indeed, the region's political independence places it at the forefront of two trends that are regularly considered thresholds of the modern world. The first is the so-called liberal revolution, the shift from monarchies of the ancien régime, where inheritance legitimated political power, to constitutional republics... The second, and related, trend consistently considered a threshold of modern history that saw Latin America in the forefront is the development of nation-states."

Historical research appears in a number of specialized journals. These include Hispanic American Historical Review (est. 1918), published by the Conference on Latin American History; The Americas, (est. 1944); Journal of Latin American Studies (1969); Canadian Journal of Latin American and Caribbean Studies, (est.1976) Bulletin of Latin American Research, (est. 1981); Colonial Latin American Review (1992); and Colonial Latin American Historical Review (est. 1992). Latin American Research Review (est. 1969), published by the Latin American Studies Association, does not focus primarily on history, but it has often published historiographical essays on particular topics.

General works on Latin American history have appeared since the 1950s, when the teaching of Latin American history expanded in U.S. universities and colleges. Most attempt full coverage of Spanish America and Brazil from the conquest to the modern era, focusing on institutional, political, social and economic history. An important, eleven volume treatment of Latin American history is The Cambridge History of Latin America, with separate volumes on the colonial era, nineteenth century, and the twentieth century. There is a small number of general works that have gone through multiple editions. Major trade publishers have also issued edited volumes on Latin American history and historiography. Reference works include the Handbook of Latin American Studies, which publishes articles by area experts, with annotated bibliographic entries, and the Encyclopedia of Latin American History and Culture.

==== Africa ====
Since most African societies recorded their history orally, written records largely focussed on the actions of outsiders. Historiography in the colonial period was undertaken by European academics and historians from a European perspective, under the pretence of Western superiority supported by scientific racism. Oral sources were deprecated and dismissed by unfamiliar historians, giving them the impression Africa had no history, nor desire to create it.

African historiography became organised at the academic level in the mid 20th century. Kenneth Dike, among others, pioneered a new methodology of reconstructing African history using the oral traditions, alongside evidence from European-style histories and other historical sciences. This movement towards utilising oral sources in a multi-disciplinary approach culminated in UNESCO commissioning the General History of Africa, edited by specialists drawn from across the African continent, and publishing from 1981 to 2024. Contemporary historians are still tasked with building the institutional frameworks incorporating African epistemologies and representing an African perspective.

==== World history ====
World history, as a distinct field of historical study, emerged as an independent academic field in the 1980s. It focused on the examination of history from a global perspective and looked for common patterns that emerged across all cultures. The basic thematic approach of this field was to analyse two major focal points: integration—how processes of world history have drawn people of the world together, and difference—how patterns of world history reveal the diversity of the human experience.

Arnold J. Toynbee's ten-volume A Study of History, took an approach that was widely discussed in the 1930s and 1940s. By the 1960s his work was virtually ignored by scholars and the general public. He compared 26 independent civilizations and argued that they displayed striking parallels in their origin, growth, and decay. He proposed a universal model to each of these civilizations, detailing the stages through which they all pass: genesis, growth, time of troubles, universal state, and disintegration. The later volumes gave too much emphasis on spirituality to satisfy critics.

Chicago historian William H. McNeill wrote The Rise of the West (1965) to show how the separate civilizations of Eurasia interacted from the very beginning of their history, borrowing critical skills from one another, and thus precipitating still further change as adjustment between traditional old and borrowed new knowledge and practice became necessary. He then discusses the dramatic effect of Western civilization on others in the past 500 years of history. McNeill took a broad approach organized around the interactions of peoples across the globe. Such interactions have become both more numerous and more continual and substantial in recent times. Before about 1500, the network of communication between cultures was that of Eurasia. The term for these areas of interaction differ from one world historian to another and include world-system and ecumene. His emphasis on cultural fusions influenced historical theory significantly.

==== The cultural turn ====
The "cultural turn" of the 1980s and 1990s affected scholars in most areas of history. Inspired largely by anthropology, it turned away from leaders, ordinary people and famous events to look at the use of language and cultural symbols to represent the changing values of society.

The British historian Peter Burke finds that cultural studies has numerous spinoffs, or topical themes it has strongly influenced. The most important include gender studies and postcolonial studies, as well as memory studies, and film studies. Diplomatic historian Melvyn P. Leffler finds that the problem with the "cultural turn" is that the culture concept is imprecise, and may produce excessively broad interpretations, because it:

seems infinitely malleable and capable of giving shape to totally divergent policies; for example, to internationalism or isolationism in the United States, and to cooperative internationalism or race hatred in Japan. The malleability of culture suggest to me that in order to understand its effect on policy, one needs also to study the dynamics of political economy, the evolution of the international system, and the roles of technology and communication, among many other variables.

==== Memory studies ====
Memory studies is a new field, focused on how nations and groups (and historians) construct and select their memories of the past in order to celebrate (or denounce) key features, thus making a statement of their current values and beliefs. Historians have played a central role in shaping the memories of the past as their work is diffused through popular history books and school textbooks. French sociologist Maurice Halbwachs, opened the field with La mémoire collective (Paris: 1950).

Many historians examine how the memory of the past has been constructed, memorialized or distorted. Historians examine how legends are invented. For example, there are numerous studies of the memory of atrocities from World War II, notably the Holocaust in Europe and Japanese war crimes in Asia. British historian Heather Jones argues that the historiography of the First World War in recent years has been reinvigorated by the cultural turn. Scholars have raised entirely new questions regarding military occupation, radicalization of politics, race, and the male body.

Representative of recent scholarship is a collection of studies on the "Dynamics of Memory and Identity in Contemporary Europe". Sage has published the scholarly journal Memory Studies since 2008, and the book series "Memory Studies" was launched by Palgrave Macmillan in 2010 with 5–10 titles a year.

== Narrative ==
According to Lawrence Stone, narrative has traditionally been the main rhetorical device used by historians. In 1979, at a time when the new Social History was demanding a social-science model of analysis, Stone detected a move back toward the narrative. Stone defined narrative as follows: it is organized chronologically; it is focused on a single coherent story; it is descriptive rather than analytical; it is concerned with people not abstract circumstances; and it deals with the particular and specific rather than the collective and statistical. He reported that, "More and more of the 'new historians' are now trying to discover what was going on inside people's heads in the past, and what it was like to live in the past, questions which inevitably lead back to the use of narrative."

Historians committed to a social science approach, however, have criticized the narrowness of narrative and its preference for anecdote over analysis, and its use of clever examples rather than statistically verified empirical regularities.

== Topics studied ==
Some of the common topics in historiography are:

- Reliability of the sources used, in terms of authorship, credibility of the author, and the authenticity or corruption of the text. (See also source criticism.)
- Historiographical tradition or framework. Every historian uses one (or more) historiographical traditions, for example Marxist, the Annales school, "total history", or political history.
- Moral issues, guilt assignment, and praise assignment
- Revisionism versus orthodox interpretations
- Historical metanarratives and metahistory, the history of history writing.

== Approaches ==
How a historian approaches historical events is one of the most important decisions within historiography. Historians commonly recognise that chronicle-style listings of individual historical facts—dealing with names, dates and places—are not particularly meaningful in themselves. Such facts only become useful/informative when assembled with other historical evidence, and the process of assembling this evidence is understood as a particular historiographical approach.

Historical revisionism can highlight the limitations of various historiographic traditions. And nomadologists may claim: "History is always written from the sedentary point of view and in the name of a unitary State apparatus [...]."

Some influential historiographical approaches include:

- Big History
- Business history, History of institutions and Official history
- Black history
- Chronology
- Comparative history
- Cultural history
- Diplomatic history
- Decolonization of knowledge
- Economic history (history of capitalism), (Business history), (financial history)
- Environmental history, a relatively new field
- Ethnohistory
- Gender history including women's history, family history, feminist history
- Global history, or World History
- Global studies
- Great man theory and Heroism
- History of the Book
- History of medicine
- History of religion and church history; the history of theology is usually handled under theology
- Indigenous history
- Industrial history and the history of technology
- Intellectual history and the history of ideas
- Labor history
- Legendary history – important in pre-modern contexts
- Local history and microhistory
- Marxist historiography and historical materialism
- Microhistory
- Migration studies
- Military history, including naval and air history
- Mythistory – history incorporating elements of myth
- National history – history focused on a nation
- Oral history and Traditional knowledge
- Political history
- Public history, especially museums and historic preservation
- Quantitative history (prosopography using statistics to study biographies)
- Historiography of science
- Social history and people's history; along with the French version the Annales school and the German Bielefeld School
- Subaltern Studies, regarding post-colonial India
- Urban history
  - American urban history
- Whig history, history interpreted as the story of continuous progress
- World history
- Zeitgeist

=== Related fields ===
Important related fields include:

- Antiquarianism
- Genealogy
- Historical archaeology
- Intellectual history
- Numismatics
- Paleography
- Philosophy of history
- Pseudohistory

== Scholarly journals ==
The historical journal, a forum where academic historians could exchange ideas and publish newly discovered information, came into being in the 19th century. The early journals were similar to those for the physical sciences, and were seen as a means for history to become more professional. The first journal to do this was Historische Zeitschrift in Germany in 1859. In France the Revue des questions historiques was set up on the model of the Historische Zeitschrift in 1866, with the more left wing Revue historique starting in reaction ten years later and they would continue to duel at least until the RQH temporarily stopped publication in 1915. Lord Acton wrote about the German historical techniques in the first issue of the English Historical Review in 1886 which he helped found, and the William and Mary Quarterly brought the format to America in 1892.

Journals also helped historians to establish various historiographical approaches, the most notable example of which was Annales. Économies, sociétés, civilisations, a publication of the Annales school in France. Journals now typically have one or more editors and associate editors, an editorial board, and a pool of scholars to whom articles that are submitted are sent for confidential evaluation. The editors will send out new books to recognized scholars for reviews that usually run 500 to 1000 words. The vetting and publication process often takes months or longer. Publication in a prestigious journal (which accept 10 percent or fewer of the articles submitted) is an asset in the academic hiring and promotion process. Publication demonstrates that the author is conversant with the scholarly field. Page charges and fees for publication are uncommon in history. Journals are subsidized by universities or historical societies, scholarly associations, and subscription fees from libraries and scholars. Increasingly they are available through library pools that allow many academic institutions to pool subscriptions to online versions. Most libraries have a system for obtaining specific articles through inter-library loan.

=== Some major historical journals ===
- 1839 Revista do Instituto Histórico e Geográfico Brasileiro (Brazil)
- 1840 Historisk tidsskrift (Denmark)
- 1859 Historische Zeitschrift (Germany)
- 1866 Archivum historicum, later Historiallinen arkisto (Finland, published in Finnish)
- 1866 Revue des questions historiques, first scholarly historical journal published in France
- 1867 Századok (Hungary)
- 1869 Časopis Matice moravské (Czech republic – then part of Austria-Hungary)
- 1871 Historisk tidsskrift (Norway)
- 1876 Revue Historique (France)
- 1880 Historisk tidskrift (Sweden)
- 1886 English Historical Review (England)
- 1887 Kwartalnik Historyczny (Poland – then part of Austria-Hungary)
- 1892 William and Mary Quarterly (US)
- 1894 Ons Hémecht (Luxembourg)
- 1895 American Historical Review (US)
- 1895 Český časopis historický (Czech republic – then part of Austria-Hungary)
- 1914 Mississippi Valley Historical Review (renamed in 1964 the Journal of American History) (US)
- 1915 The Catholic Historical Review (US)
- 1916 The Journal of Negro History (renamed in 2001 The Journal of African American History) (US)
- 1916 Historisk Tidskrift för Finland (Finland, published in Swedish)
- 1918 Hispanic American Historical Review (US)
- 1920 Canadian Historical Review (Canada)
- 1922 Slavonic and East European Review (SEER), (England)
- 1928 Scandia (Sweden)
- 1929 Annales d'histoire économique et sociale (France)
- 1935 Journal of Southern History (US)
- 1941 The Journal of Economic History (US)
- 1944 The Americas (US)
- 1951 Historia Mexicana (Mexico)
- 1952 Past & present: a journal of historical studies (England)
- 1953 Vierteljahrshefte für Zeitgeschichte (Germany)
- 1954 Ethnohistory (US)
- 1956 Journal of the Historical Society of Nigeria (Nigeria)
- 1957 Victorian Studies (US)
- 1960 Journal of African History (England)
- 1960 Technology and culture: the international quarterly of the Society for the History of Technology (US)
- 1960 History and Theory (US)
- 1967 Indian Church History Review (India) (earlier published as the Bulletin of Church History Association of India)
- 1967 The Journal of Social History (US)
- 1969 Journal of Interdisciplinary History (US)
- 1969 Journal of Latin American Studies (UK)
- 1975 Geschichte und Gesellschaft. Zeitschrift für historische Sozialwissenschaft (Germany)
- 1975 Signs (US)
- 1976 Journal of Family History (US)
- 1978 The Public Historian (US)
- 1981 Bulletin of Latin American Research (UK)
- 1982 Storia della Storiografia – History of Historiography – Histoire de l'Historiographie – Geschichte der Geschichtsschreibung
- 1982 Subaltern Studies (Oxford University Press)
- 1986 Zeitschrift für Sozialgeschichte des 20. und 21. Jahrhunderts, new title since 2003: Sozial.Geschichte. Zeitschrift für historische Analyse des 20. und 21. Jahrhunderts (Germany)
- 1990 Gender and History (US)
- 1990 Journal of World History (US)
- 1990 L'Homme. Zeitschrift für feministische Geschichtswissenschaft (Austria)
- 1990 Österreichische Zeitschrift für Geschichtswissenschaften (ÖZG)
- 1992 Women's History Review
- 1992 Colonial Latin American Historical Review (US)
- 1992 Colonial Latin American Review
- 1996 Environmental History (US)
- 2011 International Journal for the Historiography of Education

== See also ==
- List of historians by area of study
- Historical significance
- National memory

=== Methods ===
- Archival research
- Auxiliary sciences of history
- Historical method
- Humanistic historiography
- List of historians, inclusive of most major historians
  - List of historians by area of study
- List of history journals
- Philosophy of history
- Popular history
  - Primary source – documents, correspondence, diaries
    - Secondary source – interpretations, written history
      - Tertiary source – textbooks and encyclopedias
- Periodization
- Public history, including museums and historical preservation
- Historical revisionism
- Shared historical authority
- Historiography at Wikiversity, where it is part of the School of History

=== Topics ===
- African historiography
- Historiography of Argentina
- Atlantic history
- Historiography of Canada
- Chinese historiography
- Historiography of the Cold War
- Historiography of early Christianity
- Ethiopian historiography
- Historiography of the French Revolution
  - Annales school, in France
- Historiography of Germany
  - Bielefeld School, in Germany
- Greek historiography
  - Historiography of Alexander the Great
  - Classics
- History of India § Historiography
  - Historiography of the fall of the Mughal Empire
- Historiography of Islam
  - Historiography of early Islam
- Historiography of Japan
- Historiography of Korea
  - Korean nationalist historiography
- Latin American History
- Middle Ages
  - Feudalism § Historiography
  - Dark Ages (historiography)
  - Historiography of the Crusades
- Historiography and nationalism
- Historiography of Portugal
- Roman historiography
  - Historiography of the fall of the Western Roman Empire
- Historiography of Switzerland
- Historiography in the Soviet Union
- Historiography of the United Kingdom
  - Historiography of Scotland
  - Historiography of the British Empire
- Historiography of the United States
  - Frontier thesis
- World history
- Historiography of the causes of World War I
- Historiography of World War II
  - Historiography of the Battle of France, 1940

== Bibliography ==
=== Theory ===
- Appleby, Joyce; Hunt, Lynn; Jacob, Margaret (1994). Telling the Truth About History. New York: W. W. Norton & Company. ISBN 978-0393312867.
- Bentley, Michael (1999). Modern Historiography: An Introduction. ISBN 0-415-20267-1.
- Bloch, Marc (1940). The Historian's Craft.
- Burke, Peter (1992). History and Social Theory. Oxford: Polity Press.
- Cannadine, David, ed. (2002). What is History Now. Palgrave Macmillan.
- Carr, E. H. (1961). What is History?. National Geographic Books. ISBN 0-394-70391-X.
- Collingwood, R. G. (1936). The Idea of History. Oxford University Press. ISBN 0-19-285306-6.
- Deluermoz, Quentin; Singaravélou, Pierre (2021). A Past of Possibilities: A History of What Could Have Been. Yale University Press. ISBN 978-0300227543.
- Doran, Robert, ed. (2013). Philosophy of History After Hayden White. London: Bloomsbury.
- Elton, Geoffrey (1969). The Practice of History. Wiley. ISBN 0-631-22980-9.
- Evans, Richard J. (1997). In Defence of History. Granta Books. ISBN 1-86207-104-7.
- Fischer, David Hackett (1970). Historians' Fallacies: Towards a Logic of Historical Thought. Harper & Row.
- Gardiner, Juliet, ed. (1988). What is History Today...?. London: MacMillan Education Ltd.
- Harlaftis, Gelina, ed. (2010). The New Ways of History: Developments in Historiography. I.B. Tauris.
- Hewitson, Mark (2014). History and Causality. Palgrave Macmillan.
- Jenkins, Keith, ed. (2006). The Postmodern History Reader.
- Jenkins, Keith (1991). Rethinking History. ISBN 0-415-30443-1.
- Marwick, Arthur (2001). The New Nature of History: knowledge, evidence, language. Basingstoke: Palgrave. ISBN 0-333-96447-0.
- Munslow, Alan (2000). The Routledge Companion to Historical Studies.
- Olstein, Diego (2014). Thinking History Globally. Palgrave Macmillan UK. ISBN 978-1137473387.
- Spalding, Roger; Parker, Christopher (2008). Historiography: An Introduction. ISBN 978-0-7190-7285-7.
- Sreedharan, E. (2004). A Textbook of Historiography, 500 B.C. to A.D. 2000. Orient Blackswan. ISBN 978-81-250-2657-0. Archived from the original on 13 January 2023.
- Sreedharan, E. (2007). A Manual of Historical Research Methodology. South Indian Studies. ISBN 978-81-905928-0-2.
- Tosh, John (2002). The Pursuit of History. ISBN 0-582-77254-0.
- Tucker, Aviezer, ed. (2009). A Companion to the Philosophy of History and Historiography. Malden: Blackwell.
- White, Hayden (2010). Doran, Robert (ed.). The Fiction of Narrative: Essays on History, Literature, and Theory, 1957–2007. Johns Hopkins University Press.

=== Guides to scholarship ===
- Norton, Mary Beth; Gerardi, Pamela, eds. (1995). The American Historical Association's Guide to Historical Literature. Vol. 1–2 (3rd ed.). Oxford University Press. hdl:2027/heb.06298.
  - Allison, William Henry, ed. (1931). A Guide to Historical Literature.
- Backhouse, Roger E.; Fontaine, Philippe, eds. (2014). A Historiography of the Modern Social Sciences. Cambridge University Press.
- Black, Jeremy (2015). Clio's Battles: Historiography in Practice. Indiana University Press.
- Boyd, Kelly, ed. (1999). Encyclopedia of Historians and Historical Writers. Vol. 1–2.
- Cline, Howard F., ed. (1973). Guide to Ethnohistorical Sources, Handbook of Middle American Indians. Vol. 1–4. University of Texas Press.
- Gray, Wood (1964). Historian's Handbook (2nd ed.). Houghton-Mifflin Co.
- Elton, G. R. (1969). Modern Historians on British History 1485–1945: A Critical Bibliography 1945–1969.
- Loades, David, ed. (2003). Reader's Guide to British History. Vol. 1–2. Routledge. ISBN 978-1-57958-426-9.
- Oman, Charles (1906), Inaugural Lecture on The Study of History: delivered on Wednesday, February 7, 1906 , Oxford: Oxford University Press, Wikidata Q26157365 – via Wikisource
- Parish, Peter, ed. (1997). Reader's Guide to American History. Routledge. ISBN 978-1-884964-22-0.
- Popkin, Jeremy D. (2015). From Herodotus to H-Net: The Story of Historiography. Oxford University Press.
- Woolf, Daniel, ed. (2011–2012). The Oxford History of Historical Writing. Vol. 1–5.
  - Feldherr, Andrew; Hardy, Grant, eds. (2011). The Oxford History of Historical Writing: Volume 1: Beginnings to AD 600. doi:10.1093/acprof:osobl/9780199218158.001.0001. ISBN 978-0-19-921815-8.
  - Rabasa, José; Sato, Masayuki; Tortarolo, Edoardo; Woolf, Daniel, eds. (2012). The Oxford History of Historical Writing: Volume 3: 1400–1800. doi:10.1093/acprof:osobl/9780199219179.001.0001. ISBN 978-0-19-921917-9.
  - MacIntyre, Stuart; Maiguashca, Juan; Pók, Attila, eds. (2011). The Oxford History of Historical Writing: Volume 4: 1800–1945. doi:10.1093/acprof:osobl/9780199533091.001.0001. ISBN 978-0-19-953309-1.

=== Histories of historical writing ===
- Arnold, John H. (2000). History: A Very Short Introduction. New York: Oxford University Press. ISBN 978-0192853523.
- Barnes, Harry Elmer (1962). A History of Historical Writing.
- Barraclough, Geoffrey (1978). History: Main Trends of Research in the Social and Human Sciences.
- Bauer, Stefan (2020). The Invention of Papal History: Onofrio Panvinio between Renaissance and Catholic Reform. Oxford University Press.
- Bentley, Michael, ed. (1997). Companion to Historiography. Routledge. ISBN 0415285577.
- Boyd, Kelly, ed. (1999). Encyclopedia of Historians and Historical Writing. Vol. 1–2. Taylor & Francis.
- Breisach, Ernst (2007). Historiography: Ancient, Medieval and Modern (3rd ed.). ISBN 978-0-226-07278-4.
- Budd, Adam, ed. (2009). The Modern Historiography Reader: Western Sources. Routledge.
- Cline, Howard F., ed. (1965). Latin American History: Essays on Its Study and Teaching, 1898–1965. Vol. 1–2. Austin: University of Texas Press.
- Clive, John (1989). Not By Fact Alone: Essays on the Writing and Reading of History. Collins Harvill. ISBN 0-00-272041-8.
- Cohen, H. Floris (1994). The Scientific Revolution: A Historiographical Inquiry. University of Chicago Press. ISBN 0-226-11280-2.
- Conrad, Sebastian (2010). The Quest for the Lost Nation: Writing History in Germany and Japan in the American Century.
- Crymble, Adam (2021). Technology and the Historian: Transformations in the Digital Age. University of Illinois Press.
- Fitzsimons, M. A., ed. (1954). The Development of Historiography.
- Gilderhus, Mark T. (2002). History and Historians: A Historiographical Introduction. Prentice Hall. ISBN 0-13-044824-9.
- Iggers, Georg G. (2005). Historiography in the 20th Century: From Scientific Objectivity to the Postmodern Challenge.
- Kramer, Lloyd; Maza, Sarah, eds. (2006). A Companion to Western Historical Thought. Blackwell. ISBN 978-1-4051-4961-7.
- Momigliano, Arnaldo (1990). The Classical Foundation of Modern Historiography. ISBN 978-0-226-07283-8.
- The Oxford History of Historical Writing. Vol. 1–5. 2011.
- Rahman, M. M., ed. (2006). Encyclopaedia of Historiography. Anmol Publications Pvt. Limited. ISBN 978-81-261-2305-6.
- Soffer, Reba (2009). History, Historians, and Conservatism in Britain and America: From the Great War to Thatcher and Reagan.
- Thompson, James Westfall (1942). A History of Historical Writing. Vol. 1–2.
- Woolf, Daniel, ed. (1998). A Global Encyclopedia of Historical Writing. Vol. 1–2.
- Woolf, Daniel (2005). "Historiography". In Horowitz, M. C. (ed.). New Dictionary of the History of Ideas. Vol. I.
- Woolf, Daniel (2011). A Global History of History. Cambridge University Press.
- Woolf, Daniel, ed. (2011–2012). The Oxford History of Historical Writing. Vol. 1–5. Oxford University Press.
- Woolf, Daniel (2019). A Concise History Of History. Cambridge University Press.

=== Feminist historiography ===
- Smith, Bonnie G. (2000). The Gender of History: Men, Women, and Historical Practice. Harvard University Press.
- Lerner, Gerda (1979). The Majority Finds its Past: Placing Women in History. New York: Oxford University Press.
- Bennett, Judith M. (2006). History Matters: Patriarchy and the Challenge of Feminism. University of Pennsylvania Press.
- Des Jardins, Julie (2002). Women and the Historical Enterprise in America. University of North Carolina Press.
- Guy, Donna (2011). "Gender and Sexuality in Latin America". In Moya, José C. (ed.). The Oxford Handbook of Latin American History. New York: Oxford University Press. pp. 367–381.
- Lavrin, Asunción (2011). "Sexuality in Colonial Spanish America". In Moya, José C. (ed.). The Oxford Handbook of Latin American History. New York: Oxford University Press. pp. 132–154.
- Beard, Mary Ritter (1946). Woman as Force in History: A Study in Traditions and Realities.
- Spongberg, Mary (2002). Writing Women's History Since the Renaissance. Palgrave Macmillan.
- Hemmings, Clare (2011). Why Stories Matter: The Political Grammar of Feminist Theory. Duke University Press.

=== National and regional studies ===
- Berger, Stefan, ed. (1999). Writing National Histories: Western Europe Since 1800.
- Iggers, Georg G. (1975). New Directions in European Historiography.
- LaCapra, Dominic; Kaplan, Stephen L., eds. (1982). Modern European Intellectual History: Reappraisals and New Perspectives.

==== Asia and Africa ====
- Cohen, Paul (1984). Discovering History in China: American Historical Writing on the Recent Chinese Past. Columbia University Press. ISBN 0-231-52546-X. OCLC 456728837.
- Majumdar, R. C. (1970). Historiography in Modern India. Bombay. ISBN 978-2102227356.
- Marcinkowski, M. Ismail (2003). Persian Historiography and Geography: Bertold Spuler on Major Works Produced in Iran, the Caucasus, Central Asia, India and Early Ottoman Turkey. Singapore: Pustaka Nasional.
- Martin, Thomas R. (2009). Herodotus and Sima Qian: The First Great Historians of Greece and China: A Brief History with Documents.
- Sreedharan, E. (2004). A Textbook of Historiography, 500 B.C. to A.D. 2000.
- Sharma, Arvind (2003). Hinduism and Its Sense of History. Oxford University Press. ISBN 978-0-19-566531-4.
- Shourie, Arun (2014). Eminent Historians: Their Technology, Their Line, Their Fraud. Noida: HarperCollins Publishers. ISBN 978-9351365914.
- Yerxa, Donald A. (2008). Recent Themes in the History of Africa and the Atlantic World: Historians in Conversation.

==== Britain ====
- Bann, Stephen (1995). Romanticism and the Rise of History. Twayne Publishers.
- Bentley, Michael (2006). Modernizing England's Past: English Historiography in the Age of Modernism, 1870–1970.
- Cannadine, David (2003). In Churchill's Shadow: Confronting the Past in Modern Britain.
- Furber, Elizabeth, ed. (1966). Changing Views on British History; Essays on Historical Writing Since 1939.
- Goldstein, Doris S. (1986). "The origins and early years of the English Historical Review". English Historical Review. 101 (398): 6–19. doi:10.1093/ehr/ci.cccxcviii.6.
- Goldstein, Doris S. (1982). "The Organizational Development of the British Historical Profession, 1884–1921". Historical Research. 55 (132): 180–193. doi:10.1111/j.1468-2281.1982.tb01157.x.
- Hale, J. R., ed. (1967). The Evolution of British Historiography: From Bacon to Namier. Macmillan.
- Hexter, J. H. (1979). On Historians: Reappraisals of Some of the Makers of Modern History.
- Howsam, Leslie (2004). "Academic Discipline or Literary Genre?: The Establishment of Boundaries in Historical Writing". Victorian Literature and Culture. 32 (2): 525–545. doi:10.1017/S1060150304000646.
- Jann, Rosemary (1985). The Art and Science of Victorian History.
- Jann, Rosemary (1983). "From Amateur to Professional: The Case of the Oxbridge Historians". Journal of British Studies. 22 (2): 122–147. doi:10.1086/385807.
- Kenyon, John (1983). The History Men: The Historical Profession in England since the Renaissance.
- Loades, David (2003). Reader's Guide to British History. Vol. 1–2.
- Mitchell, Rosemary (2000). Picturing the Past: English History in Text and Image 1830–1870. Oxford: Clarendon Press.
- Philips, Mark Salber (2000). Society and Sentiment: Genres of Historical Writing in Britain, 1740–1820. Princeton University Press.
- Richardson, Roger Charles, ed. (1998). The Debate on the English Revolution (2nd ed.). Manchester University Press.
- Schlatter, Richard, ed. (1984). Recent Views on British History: Essays on Historical Writing Since 1966.

===== British Empire =====
- Berger, Carl (1986). Writing Canadian History: Aspects of English Canadian Historical Writing since 1900 (2nd ed.).
- Bhattacharjee, J. B. (2012). Historians and Historiography of North East India.
- Davison, Graeme (2000). The Use and Abuse of Australian History.
- Farrell, Frank (1990). Themes in Australian History: Questions, Issues and Interpretation in an Evolving Historiography.
- Gare, Deborah (2000). "Britishness in Recent Australian Historiography". The Historical Journal. 43 (4): 1145–1155. doi:10.1017/S0018246X00001564. JSTOR 3020885.
- Guha, Ranajit (1998). Dominance Without Hegemony: History and Power in Colonial India. Harvard University Press.
- Granatstein, J. L. (1998). Who Killed Canadian History?.
- Mittal, S. C. (1995). India Distorted: A Study of British Historians on India.
- Saunders, Christopher (1988). The Making of the South African Past: Major Historians on Race and Class.
- Winks, Robin, ed. (2001). The Oxford History of the British Empire: Volume V: Historiography.

==== France ====
- Burke, Peter (2015). The French Historical Revolution: The Annales School 1929–2014. John Wiley & Sons.
- Clark, Stuart (1983). "French historians and early modern popular culture". Past & Present (100): 62–99. doi:10.1093/past/100.1.62.
- Daileader, Philip; Whalen, Philip, eds. (2010). French Historians 1900–2000: New Historical Writing in Twentieth-Century France. John Wiley & Sons. ISBN 978-1-4443-2366-5.
- Revel, Jacques; Hunt, Lynn, eds. (1995). Histories: French Constructions of the Past.
- Stoianovich, Traian (1976). French Historical Method: The Annales Paradigm.

==== Germany ====
- Fletcher, Roger (1984). "Recent developments in West German Historiography: the Bielefeld School and its critics". German Studies Review. 7 (3): 451–480. doi:10.2307/1428885. JSTOR 1428885.
- Hagemann, Karen; Quataert, Jean H., eds. (2008). Gendering Modern German History: Rewriting Historiography.
- Iggers, Georg G. (1983). The German Conception of History: The National Tradition of Historical Thought from Herder to the Present (2nd ed.).
- Rüger, Jan; Wachsmann, Nikolaus, eds. (2015). Rewriting German History: New Perspectives on Modern Germany. Palgrave Macmillan.
- Sheehan, James J. (1981). "What is German history? Reflections on the role of the nation in German history and historiography". Journal of Modern History. 53 (1): 2–23. doi:10.1086/242239. JSTOR 1877062.
- Sperber, Jonathan (1991). "Master Narratives of Nineteenth-century German History". Central European History. 24 (1): 69–91. doi:10.1017/S0008938900016599.
- Stuchtey, Benedikt; Wende, Peter, eds. (2000). British and German Historiography, 1750–1950: Traditions, Perceptions, and Transfers.

==== Latin America ====
- Adelman, Jeremy, ed. (1999). Colonial Legacies. New York: Routledge.
- Coatsworth, John (1985). "Cliometrics and Mexican History". Historical Methods. 18 (1): 31–37. doi:10.1080/01615440.1985.10594146.
- Gootenberg, Paul (2004). "Between a Rock and a Softer Place: Reflections on Some Recent Economic History of Latin America". Latin American Research Review. 39 (2): 239–257. doi:10.1353/lar.2004.0031. S2CID 144339079.
- Kuznesof, Elizabeth; Oppenheimer, Robert (1985). "The Family and Society in Nineteenth-Century Latin America: An Historiographical Introduction". Journal of Family History. 10 (3): 215–234. doi:10.1177/036319908501000301. S2CID 145607701.
- Lockhart, James (1972). "The Social History of Early Latin America". Latin American Research Review. 7 (3): 6–45. doi:10.1017/S0023879100041194.
- Moya, José C. (2011). The Oxford Handbook of Latin American History. New York: Oxford University Press.
- Russell-Wood, A. J. R. (2001). "Archives and the Recent Historiography on Colonial Brazil". Latin American Research Review. 36 (1): 175–103. doi:10.1017/S0023879100018847. S2CID 252750152.
- Van Young, Eric (1999). "The New Cultural History Comes to Old Mexico". The Hispanic American Historical Review. 79 (2): 211–248. doi:10.1215/00182168-79.2.211.

==== United States ====
- Hofstadter, Richard (1968). The Progressive Historians: Turner, Beard, Parrington.
- Novick, Peter (1988). That Noble Dream: The "Objectivity Question" and the American Historical Profession. ISBN 0-521-34328-3.
- Palmer, William W. (2012). "All Coherence Gone? A Cultural History of Leading History Departments in the United States, 1970–2010". Journal of the Historical Society. 12 (2): 111–153. doi:10.1111/j.1540-5923.2012.00360.x.
- Palmer, William (2001). Engagement with the Past: The Lives and Works of the World War II Generation of Historians.
- Parish, Peter J., ed. (1997). Reader's Guide to American History.
- Wish, Harvey (1960). The American Historian.

=== Themes, organizations, and teaching ===
- Carlebach, Elishiva, ed. (1998). Jewish History and Jewish Memory: Essays in Honor of Yosef Hayim Yerushalmi.
- Charlton, Thomas L. (2007). History of Oral History: Foundations and Methodology.
- Darcy, R.; Rohrs, Richard C. (1995). A Guide to Quantitative History.
- Dawidowicz, Lucy S. (1981). The Holocaust and Historians.
- Ernest, John (2004). Liberation Historiography: African American Writers and the Challenge of History, 1794–1861.
- Evans, Ronald W. (2011). The Hope for American School Reform: The Cold War Pursuit of Inquiry Learning in Social Studies. Palgrave Macmillan.
- Ferro, Marc (1988). Cinema and History.
- Green, Anna; Troup, Kathleen (2016). The Houses of History: A Critical Reader in Twentieth Century History and Theory (2nd ed.). Manchester University Press.
- Hudson, Pat (2002). History by Numbers: An Introduction to Quantitative Approaches.
- Jarzombek, Mark (1999). "A Prolegomenon to Critical Historiography" (PDF). Journal of Architectural Education. 52 (4): 197–206. doi:10.1111/j.1531-314X.1999.tb00272.x.
- Keita, Maghan (2000). Race and the Writing of History. Oxford University Press.
- Leavy, Patricia (2011). Oral History: Understanding Qualitative Research.
- Loewen, James W. (1996). Lies My Teacher Told Me: Everything Your American History Textbook Got Wrong.
- Manning, Patrick, ed. (2006). World History: Global And Local Interactions.
- Maza, Sarah (2017). Thinking About History. Chicago: University of Chicago Press. doi:10.7208/chicago/9780226109473.001.0001. ISBN 978-0-226-10933-6.
- Meister, Daniel R. (2017). "The biographical turn and the case for historical biography". History Compass. 16 (1) e12436. doi:10.1111/hic3.12436.
- Morris-Suzuki, Tessa (2005). The Past Within Us: Media, Memory, History. Verso. ISBN 1-85984-513-4.
- Ritchie, Donald A. (2010). The Oxford Handbook of Oral History.
- Tröhler, Daniel (2019). "History and Historiography: Approaches to Historical Research in Education". In Fitzgerald, T. (ed.). Handbook of Historical Studies in Education. pp. 1–17. doi:10.1007/978-981-10-0942-6_1-1.
