= Keith Jenkins =

British historiographer

Keith Jenkins (1943) is a British historiographer. Jenkins studied medieval and modern history as well as political theory at The University of Nottingham. Like Hayden White and "postmodern" historiographers, Jenkins believes that any historian's output should be seen as a story. A work of history is as much about the historian's own world view and ideological positions as it is about past events. This means that different historians will inevitably ascribe different meanings to the same historical events. Nevertheless, all historians are constrained by the common body of historical evidence (or "artifacts").

Jenkins consistently works to undercut and move readers beyond "traditional" and "moribund" histories. He believes that history is "promiscuous" and therefore lends itself to each historian's interpretation. Therefore, history ought to end, and Jenkins desires "the era or the raising of consciousness of the aporia... of the undeniability of the decision and incredulity towards metanarrative". However, despite arguing for the end of history, Jenkins also accepts the possibility of experimental histories written "beyond the limits of the academic genre". He further acknowledges that history will neither be quick nor easy to let go. He is the author of Re-thinking History (1991) and On "What is History" : From Carr and Elton to Rorty and White (1995), edited The Postmodern History Reader (1997), and is the author of Why History? Ethics and Postmodernity (1999). With Alun Munslow he co-authored The Nature of History Reader (2004), in which key pieces of writing by leading historians are reproduced and evaluated, with an explanation and critique of their character and assumptions. "Re-thinking History" is simultaneously his first and best-known book. A theme issue of the journal Rethinking History was dedicated to his work and a critical account has been published by Dr. Alexander Macfie in June 2012 in Reviews in History, a publication of the Institute of Historical Research.

Jenkins retired from the position of professor of historical theory at the University of Chichester in 2008.

== Bibliography ==
- Re-thinking History (1991)
- On "What is History" From Carr and Elton to Rorty and White (1995)
- The Postmodern History Reader (1997)
- Why History? Ethics and Postmodernity (1999)
- Refiguring History (2003)
- The Nature of History Reader (2004)
- At the Limits of History (2009)
