= Historiography of Portugal =

Study of the history of Portugal

The historiography of Portugal is the study of the history of Portugal. The earliest historical records in the territory corresponding to Portugal predate the nation's founding, such as those of Paulo Orósio and Idácio de Chaves, who wrote about the last years of Roman rule and the arrival of Germanic tribes. In the first half of the 10th century, in Alandalus, Amade ibne Maomé Arrazi wrote the first general history of the Iberian Peninsula, disseminated in the Christian kingdoms under the name Crónica do Mouro Rasis. Testimonies continue in the Middle Ages with Pedro Afonso, Count of Barcelos and the chroniclers Fernão Lopes, Gomes Eanes de Zurara and Rui de Pina among others, and further during the expansion of the Portuguese Empire through authors such as João de Barros, Fernão Lopes de Castanheda, Gaspar Correia and Damião de Góis.

Understanding Portugal and its history is a constant theme in Portuguese historiography: the conditions that made Portugal's autonomy possible and, later, allowed it to build and maintain an identity in the Peninsula and in the world are at the heart of the analysis, accentuated from the 19th century onwards, by historians and thinkers such as Alexandre Herculano, Oliveira Martins, Antero de Quental, Sampaio Bruno, Jaime Cortesão, António Sérgio and Joel Serrão, among others.

Reading Portuguese history in terms of a cycle of rise and fall, from world power to geopolitical irrelevance, is a distinctly nineteenth-century interpretation. Due to its geographical position and geomorphological characteristics. Portugal occupies an eccentric position relative to Europe. Its position on the Atlantic Ocean, extended since the 15th century by the two archipelagos of the Azores and Madeira, was key to its history and national identity: nestled between a powerful neighbour and the sea, the Portuguese knew how to take advantage of their strategic situation, both by building a military power at sea and by allying themselves with the dominant naval power (the Anglo-Portuguese Alliance), ensuring their survival in the face of the hegemonic ambitions of the European powers. Veríssimo Serrão wrote (History of Portugal, vol. 1): "in the face of a Spain five times larger, there was no miracle in the Portuguese case, but only the adequate integration of its natives into a political framework that ensured the autonomous existence that any maritime periphery amply favours".

== See also ==
- Timeline of Portuguese history
