= Butuan Ivory Seal =

Butuan Ivory Seal, Philippines

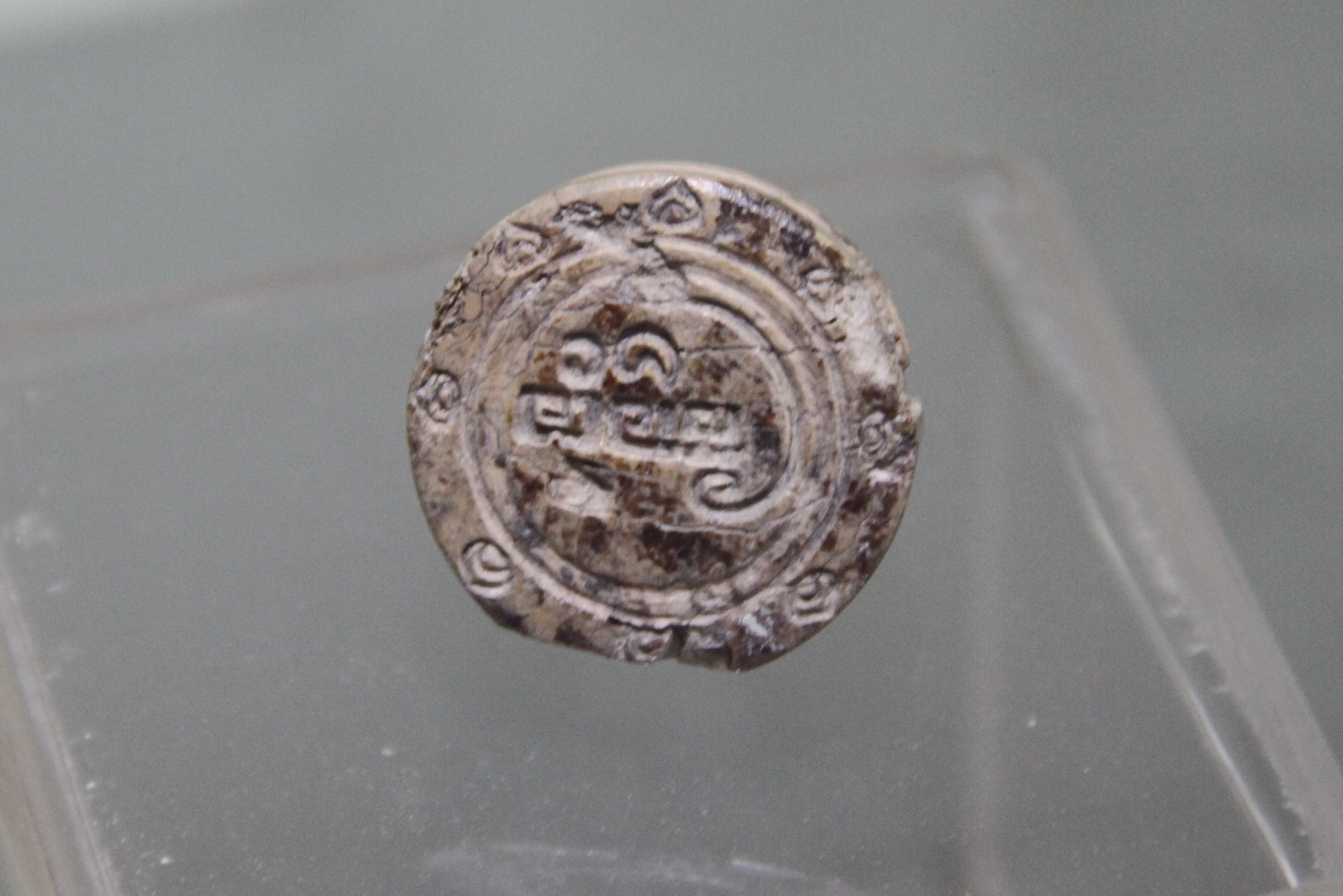
The Butuan ivory seal housed in the National Museum of the Philippines.

The Butuan Ivory Seal or BIS is an ivory stamp or seal stamp or a privy seal associated with a Rhinoceros Ivory Tusk, dated 9th–12th century, was found in Libertad, Butuan in Agusan del Norte in southern Philippines. Inscribed on the seal is the word Butban in stylized Kawi. Butban was presumed to stand for Butuan. The ivory seal is now housed at the National Museum of the Philippines.

== Discovery ==
Another archaeological piece with ancient inscription, the Butuan Ivory Seal was recovered in the 1970s by pot hunters in a prehistoric shell midden site in Ambangan, Libertad, Butuan in Agusan del Norte. Made of ivory, the object could have been used to stamp documents or goods during trading.

The ivory seal as well as other archaeological materials recovered in Ambangan archaeological sites are proof that Rajahnate of Butuan was an important trading center whose official seal marked the source of commodities it produced and exported.

=== Transcription ===
Line	Kawi	Transliteration
1	𑼨𑼸𑼡𑽂𑼮𑼥𑽁	butwan

The Kawi lettering reads "Butwan". The three square seal style characters are BA, TA and NA; the leftward curl underneath BA is the /u/ vowel diacritic, changing the syllable to BU; the small heart-shaped character under TA is the subscript conjunct form of WA which also removes the default /a/ vowel from TA; the large curl to the upper right is the Kawi virama, which indicates the default /a/ vowel on NA is not pronounced. The three blocks of characters together read "[Bu][Twa][N-]."

== Dating ==
Dated 1002 A.D., the seal could have been used for documentation in trading. Butuan was the center of trade and commerce in northeastern Mindanao since the 10th century.

There were other notable discoveries like the Ivory Seal and the Silver Paleograph. Gold and tools for gold processing of ornaments have also been recovered from a village site. Over a hundred clay crucibles and tools for the processing of gold items were discovered in the area, leading to the conclusion that an extensive gold ornaments industry was located in these areas as far back as a thousand years ago. Altogether, these data demonstrate that Butuan was a thriving international trading port a thousand years ago. This site has a tremendous historical impact in the Asian region.

== See also ==
- Kawi script, the writing system used in the Butuan ivory seal;
- Rajahnate of Butuan, the historical polity related to the Butuan ivory seal;
- Butuan Silver Paleograph, a similar artifact with a still-undeciphered script;
- Golden Tara, another artifact from precolonial Butuan;
