= John Tosh =

British historian

John Tosh FRHistS
- Born: 1945 (age 80–81)

Academic background
- Education: University of Oxford; University of Cambridge; University of London

Academic work
- Discipline: Historian
- Sub-discipline: historiography; gender history
- Institutions: University of Roehampton

John A. Tosh FRHistS (birth 1945) is a British historian, historiographer and academic. He is Professor Emeritus of History at Roehampton University.

== Academic career ==
He gained his BA at the University of Oxford and his MA at the University of Cambridge. He was awarded his PhD by the University of London in 1973; his thesis topic being "Political Authority among the Langi of Northern Uganda, circa 1800–1939". He is a Fellow of the Royal Historical Society. In 1987–88, he held a visiting appointment at the University of California, Davis. At Roehampton University, he teaches History, specifically "Reading and Writing History". He served as Vice-President of the Royal Historical Society from 1999 to 2002. He has also published several works on the history of masculinity in nineteenth-century Britain. He is currently preparing a critical analysis of the social applications of historical perspective in contemporary Britain.

Tosh's claim to originality and notability rests largely on his work as a historian and historiographer. Since the turn of the millennium, he has taken a leading role as a public historian in developing the history of masculinity and ensuring it has become an important dimension of social and cultural history. He has shown how domesticity, previously regarded as an aspect of women's history, also conditioned and influenced the lives of men and society. As a historiographer, he has updated the way we look at the study of history and how we construct our knowledge of the past, as well as providing insight into the works of other historians and their impact on the study of the subject.

== Personal life ==
He is the father of philosopher Nick Tosh.

== Works ==
- Clan leaders and colonial chiefs in Lango: the political history of an East African stateless society, c1800–1939 (Clarendon Press, 1978)
- Manful assertions: masculinities in Britain since 1800; joint editor with Michael Roper (Routledge, 1991)
- A Man's Place: Masculinity and the Middle-Class Home in Victorian England (Yale University Press, 1999)
- Historians on History: An Anthology (Pearson Education, 2000)
- Masculinities in Politics and War: gendering modern history; joint editor with Stefan Dudink & Karen Hagenamm (Manchester University Press, 2004)
- Manliness and masculinities in nineteenth-century Britain: essays on gender, family and empire (Pearson Longman, 2005)
- The Pursuit of History: Aims, Methods and New Directions in the Study of Modern History (7th ed, Routledge, 2022)
- Why History Matters (Palgrave, 2008)
