= Journal of Family History =

- Discipline: History
- Language: English
- Edited by: Roderick Phillips

Publication details
- History: 1976-present
- Publisher: SAGE Publications (United Kingdom)
- Frequency: Quarterly
- Impact factor: 0.333 (2017)

Standard abbreviations
- ISO 4: J. Fam. Hist.

Indexing
- ISSN: 0363-1990 (print); 1552-5473 (web)
- LCCN: 76648808
- OCLC no.: 2514766

Links
- Journal homepage; Online access; Online archive

Journal of Family History is a peer-reviewed academic journal that publishes papers in the fields of History and Anthropology. The journal's editor is Roderick Phillips (Carleton University). It is currently published by SAGE Publications.

== History ==
The Journal of Family History was established in 1975 by Tamara K. Hareven; its first issue was published in 1976.

== Scope ==
Journal of Family History is a resource for scholars who are interested in the history of the family over the past three decades. The journal provides a forum for international research on family, kinship and population. Journal of Family history focuses on work from different perspectives such as gender, race and culture. Many of the articles are written by recognized historians.

== Abstracting and indexing ==
Journal of Family History is abstracted and indexed in, among other databases: SCOPUS, and the Social Sciences Citation Index. According to the Journal Citation Reports, its 2017 impact factor is 0.333, ranking it 27 out of 31 journals in the category ‘History of Social Sciences’. and 53 out of 89 journals in the category ‘History’. and 45 out of 46 journals in the category ‘Family Studies’. and 75 out of 85 journals in the category ‘Anthropology’.
