= Alun Munslow =

British historian (1947–2019)

Alun Munslow (1947–2019) was a British historian known for his deconstructionist and postmodernist approach to historiography. He was Professor Emeritus of History and Historical Theory at Staffordshire University, and Visiting Professor at the University of Chichester.

Munslow argued that prior to engaging with the past, historians need to acknowledge that the past and history do not share the same ontic and epistemic space. He suggests that the past is the time before our perpetual present and 'history' is a range of authored narratives that we substitute for it. Munslow suggests that the consequences of this argument are substantial, including that we can only engage with the aesthetics of 'historying' because we cannot access the nature of the past. The historian therefore should not confuse the past with history, as the past is the 'before now' and cannot anticipate the future. He accepts that this may seem ironic, as history is a singularly unprivileged authorial act undertaken in the perpetual present about the ineffable past.

Munslow wrote a number of works on the philosophy of history, including Discourse and Culture: The Creation of America, 1870-1920 (1992), Deconstructing History (1997), The New History (2003), Narrative and History (2007; second edition 2018), The Future of History (2010), A History of History (2012) and Authoring the Past (2013). He was the UK founding co-editor of the journal Rethinking History: The Journal of Theory and Practice, relinquishing its UK editorship in 2017 to Kalle Pihlainen and Patrick Finney. In 2020, the journal published a tribute to Munslow, reflecting on his contributions to historiography and postmodernist historical theory.
