= Butuan Silver Paleograph =

Inscribed metal artefact found in the Philippines

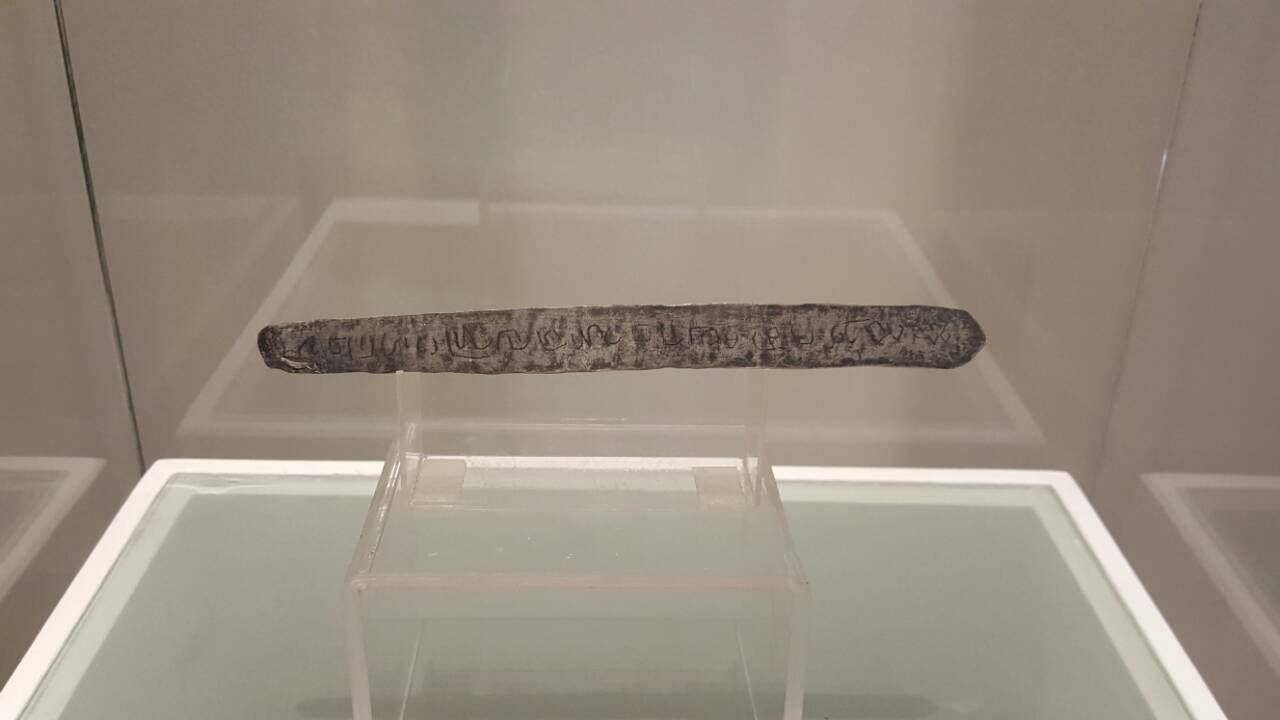
The Butuan Silver Paleograph, housed and displayed at the National Museum of Anthropology in Manila.

The Butuan Silver Palaeograph, also known as the Butuan Silver Strip, is a piece of metal with inscriptions found in Butuan, in the Agusan province of the Philippines, in mid-1970s.

The artifact was unearthed by a team of archaeologists from the National Museum of the Philippines. Treasure hunters who were looking for old ceramics and gold ornaments discovered this metal strip inside a wooden coffin.

Additional coffins of the same type, dating back to the 14th and 15th centuries, were found at the site. According to Jesus Peralta, the coffins contained human remains with artificially deformed skulls - a practice in this region limited to Southern Philippines and unpopular in Luzon. Due to the similarities found between the coffins, archaeologists originally assumed that the artifact originated in the same era.

The paleograph has yet to be deciphered. Peralta indicated that Boechari of Indonesia identified the writings as closely resembling a Javanese script that existed from the 12th to the 15th century. Debate has arisen concerning the artifact's origin, but it currently is considered to originate in Butuan, where it was found.

The artifact is now in the possession of Proceso Gonzales, the city engineer of Butuan.
